= National Register of Historic Places listings in Orleans Parish, Louisiana =

Location of Orleans Parish in Louisiana

Orleans Parish, Louisiana, United States, which is consolidated with the city of New Orleans, has 195 properties and districts listed on the National Register of Historic Places, including 24 National Historic Landmarks. Five properties were once listed, but have since been removed.

The locations of National Register properties for which the latitude and longitude coordinates are included below may be seen in a map.

This National Park Service list is complete through NPS recent listings posted August 28, 2026.

== Current listings ==
| | Name on the Register | Image | Date listed | Location | Description |
|---|---|---|---|---|---|
| 1 | 1309 Harmony Street | 1309 Harmony Street | March 17, 2025 (#100011524) | 1309 Harmony Street; 29°55′34″N 90°05′16″W | 1898 house, early work of architect Emile Weil |
| 2 | Agudath Achim Anshe Sfard Synagogue | Agudath Achim Anshe Sfard Synagogue | August 2, 2017 (#100001432) | 2230 Carondelet St. 29°56′04″N 90°04′55″W | |
| 3 | Aldrich-Genella House | Aldrich-Genella House | October 8, 1980 (#80001742) | 4801 St. Charles Avenue; 29°55′35″N 90°06′24″W | |
| 4 | Algiers Point | Algiers Point | August 1, 1978 (#78001428) | Bounded by the Mississippi River, Slidell St., and Atlantic Ave.; also roughly bounded by Slidell, Brooklyn, Atlantic, Newton, and Homer Sts. 29°57′05″N 90°03′02″W | Second set of boundaries represents a boundary increase of March 17, 2011 |
| 5 | All Saints Church and School | All Saints Church and School | December 5, 2019 (#100004729) | 1441 Teche St. 29°56′26″N 90°03′07″W | |
| 6 | American Chicle Company Building | American Chicle Company Building | September 18, 1998 (#98001176) | 8311 Fig St. 29°57′43″N 90°07′03″W | |
| 7 | Arabella Station | Arabella Station | January 4, 1996 (#95001484) | 5600 Magazine Street; 29°55′14″N 90°07′03″W | Formerly a 19th-century streetcar barn; now redeveloped and housing a grocery market. |
| 8 | Bank of Louisiana | Bank of Louisiana | June 19, 1973 (#73000870) | 334 Royal Street; 29°57′21″N 90°04′00″W | |
| 9 | Bank of New Orleans (BNO) Building | Bank of New Orleans (BNO) Building | October 11, 2016 (#16000712) | 1010 Common St. 29°57′14″N 90°04′24″W | |
| 10 | Big Oak-Little Oak Islands | | July 14, 1971 (#71000357) | Within marshes along the shoreline of Lake Pontchartrain, northeast of central New Orleans; 30°04′28″N 89°53′49″W | Pre-Columbian habitation sites |
| 11 | Blue Plate Building | Blue Plate Building | October 16, 2008 (#08000989) | 1315 S. Jefferson Davis Parkway; 29°57′27″N 90°06′20″W | Art Deco factory building |
| 12 | Bohn Motor Company Automobile Dealership | Bohn Motor Company Automobile Dealership | February 1, 2011 (#10001193) | 2700 South Broad; 29°57′03″N 90°05′59″W | |
| 13 | Bristow Tower | Bristow Tower | January 26, 2016 (#15001001) | 4537 Magnolia St. 29°56′14″N 90°06′16″W | |
| 14 | Broadmoor Historic District | Broadmoor Historic District | June 13, 2003 (#03000519) | Roughly bounded by South Broad/Fountainebleau, Milan, S. Claiborne, and Octavia; also roughly bounded by Walmsley, S. White, Eden, and S. Jefferson Davis Parkway; 29°56′48″N 90°06′22″W | Second set of boundaries represents a boundary increase of September 13, 2007 |
| 15 | Building at 225 Baronne Street | Building at 225 Baronne Street | September 10, 2013 (#13000694) | 225 Baronne St. 29°57′10″N 90°04′20″W | |
| 16 | Buildings at 445–447–449 South Rampart | Buildings at 445–447–449 South Rampart | August 30, 2007 (#07000857) | 445–449 S. Rampart Street; 29°57′02″N 90°04′30″W | |
| 17 | Bullitt-Longenecker House | Bullitt-Longenecker House | October 1, 1981 (#81000296) | 3627 Carondelet Street; 29°55′42″N 90°05′42″W | |
| 18 | Bywater Historic District | Bywater Historic District | January 23, 1986 (#86000113) | Roughly bounded by N. Claiborne Avenue and Urquhart St., Kentucky St., the Mississippi River, and Montegut and Press Sts. 29°58′00″N 90°02′17″W | |
| 19 | The Cabildo | The Cabildo | October 15, 1966 (#66000373) | 701 Chartres St. 29°57′26″N 90°03′51″W | Late 18th-century building on Jackson Square; city hall from the colonial era through early 19th century; now one of the properties of the Louisiana State Museum. |
| 20 | George Washington Cable House | George Washington Cable House | October 15, 1966 (#66000374) | 1313 8th St. 29°55′35″N 90°05′14″W | Garden District cottage, the home of writer George Washington Cable between 1874 and 1884 |
| 21 | Canal Ford | Canal Ford | January 24, 2024 (#100009422) | 1661 Canal St. 29°57′32″N 90°04′38″W | 1960s brutalist commercial building |
| 22 | Carrollton Historic District | Carrollton Historic District | November 2, 1987 (#87001893) | Roughly bounded by Lowerline St., the Mississippi River, Monticello Ave., and Earhart Boulevard; also bounded by Claiborne, National Octavia, Grape, and Lowerline; 29°57′08″N 90°07′38″W | Second set of boundaries represents a boundary increase of September 6, 2007 |
| 23 | Carver Theater | Carver Theater | August 20, 1998 (#98001078) | 2101 Orleans Avenue; 29°58′00″N 90°04′36″W | |
| 24 | Castle Family House | Castle Family House | October 10, 2023 (#100009427) | 917-919 North Tonti St. 29°58′13″N 90°04′40″W | former home of civil rights activist Oretha Castle Haley |
| 25 | Central City Historic District | Central City Historic District | July 9, 1982 (#82002783) | Roughly bounded by Pontchartrain Expressway and Louisiana, St. Charles, and Claiborne Aves. 29°56′20″N 90°05′10″W | |
| 26 | Charity Hospital of New Orleans | Charity Hospital of New Orleans | January 24, 2011 (#10001173) | 1532 Tulane Ave. 29°57′19″N 90°04′41″W | |
| 27 | Confederate Memorial Hall | Confederate Memorial Hall | June 11, 1975 (#75000852) | 929 Camp St. 29°56′36″N 90°04′53″W | |
| 28 | Congo Square | Congo Square | January 28, 1993 (#92001763) | Junction of Rampart and St. Peter Streets; 29°57′39″N 90°04′06″W | Gathering place for African-American music and dance since colonial era; now within Louis Armstrong Park |
| 29 | Criminal Courts Building | Criminal Courts Building | January 12, 1984 (#84001337) | 2700 Tulane Ave. 29°57′41″N 90°05′37″W | |
| 30 | Nathaniel C. & Frances Curtis Jr. House | Nathaniel C. & Frances Curtis Jr. House | June 16, 2014 (#14000311) | 6161 Marquette Pl. 29°56′00″N 90°07′06″W | |
| 31 | Guy J. and Rose Caruso D'Antonio House | Guy J. and Rose Caruso D'Antonio House | October 11, 2016 (#16000710) | 2621 O'Reilly St. 29°58′58″N 90°04′23″W | |
| 32 | Delta Queen (Steamboat) | Delta Queen (Steamboat) | June 15, 1970 (#70000495) | 30 Robin Street Wharf; 29°56′03″N 90°03′39″W | |
| 33 | Deluge | Deluge | June 30, 1989 (#89001427) | Mississippi River north of Canal St. Algiers Ferry; 29°57′20″N 90°03′18″W | Formerly a National Historic Landmark, designation removed in 2023. |
| 34 | Dew Drop Inn | Dew Drop Inn | March 14, 2022 (#100007552) | 2836 LaSalle St. 29°56′13″N 90°05′30″W | |
| 35 | Dillard University | Dillard University | April 10, 2003 (#03000202) | 2601 Gentilly Boulevard; 29°59′50″N 90°03′56″W | Historically black university, named for James Hardy Dillard |
| 36 | James H. Dillard House | James H. Dillard House | December 2, 1974 (#74000929) | 571 Audubon St. 29°56′07″N 90°07′34″W | |
| 37 | Dryades Branch Library | Dryades Branch Library | October 22, 2020 (#100005710) | 1924 Philip St. 29°56′10″N 90°05′04″W | |
| 38 | Eagle Saloon Building | Eagle Saloon Building | October 16, 2002 (#02001160) | 401–403 South Rampart Street; 29°57′05″N 90°04′30″W | Key venue in the early development of jazz in the late 19th and early 20th centuries |
| 39 | Edgewood Park Historic District | Edgewood Park Historic District | September 24, 2014 (#14000690) | Roughly bounded by Peoples & Humanity Sts., Gentilly Blvd., Peoples Ave. & Fairmont Dr. 29°59′48″N 90°03′10″W | |
| 40 | Esplanade Ridge Historic District | Esplanade Ridge Historic District | June 30, 1980 (#80001743) | U.S. Route 90; 29°58′34″N 90°04′42″W | The Faubourg St. John area was settled in 1708 as Port Bayou Saint-Jean ten years before the city of New Orleans was founded. |
| 41 | Factors Row and Thiberge Buildings | Factors Row and Thiberge Buildings | April 4, 1983 (#83000529) | 401–405 Carondelet and 802–830 Perdido St. 29°57′02″N 90°04′19″W | |
| 42 | Faubourg Marigny | Faubourg Marigny | December 31, 1974 (#74000930) | Roughly bounded by the Mississippi River, Esplanade Avenue, Marias St., and Montegut St. 29°57′55″N 90°03′20″W | Neighborhood established by Bernard de Marigny in the early 1800s, site of the former Marigny plantation just below the Vieux Carré. |
| 43 | Federal Building | Federal Building | June 19, 2017 (#100001218) | 600 S. Maestri Pl. 29°56′52″N 90°04′13″W | Now called the F. Edward Hebert Building. |
| 44 | Federal Fibre Mills Building | Federal Fibre Mills Building | March 24, 1983 (#83004190) | 1101 S. Peters St. 29°56′25″N 90°03′58″W | |
| 45 | First National Life Insurance Building | First National Life Insurance Building | March 24, 2023 (#100008749) | 1000 Howard Ave. 29°56′45″N 90°04′36″W | |
| 46 | Flint-Goodridge Hospital of Dillard University | Flint-Goodridge Hospital of Dillard University | January 13, 1989 (#88003139) | Louisiana Ave. and LaSalle St. 29°56′10″N 90°05′41″W | African-American hospital in Jim Crow Law era |
| 47 | Fort Macomb | Fort Macomb | October 11, 1978 (#78001429) | East of central New Orleans at Chef Menteur Pass on U.S. Route 90; 30°03′51″N 89°48′15″W | Early 19th-century brick fortress |
| 48 | Fort Pike | Fort Pike | August 14, 1972 (#72000557) | North of central New Orleans off U.S. Route 90, E. 30°09′58″N 89°44′13″W | Early 19th-century brick fortress |
| 49 | Fort St. John | Fort St. John | February 11, 1983 (#83000530) | Bayou St. John off Robert E. Lee Boulevard; 30°01′20″N 90°05′00″W | Colonial-era fort, later amusement park; also known as "Old Spanish Fort" |
| 50 | Fourth Church of Christ, Scientist | Fourth Church of Christ, Scientist | July 19, 2002 (#02000782) | 134 Polk Ave. 30°00′05″N 90°06′51″W | |
| 51 | William Frantz Elementary School | William Frantz Elementary School | June 8, 2005 (#05000557) | 3811 N. Galvez St. 29°58′35″N 90°01′59″W | 1937 public school building which was the site of racial desegregation protests in 1960, when Ruby Bridges was enrolled here |
| 52 | French Market-Old Vegetable Market | French Market-Old Vegetable Market | March 29, 1972 (#72000558) | 1000 Decatur Street; 29°57′33″N 90°03′37″W | Historic building of the French Market complex |
| 53 | Gallier Hall | Gallier Hall | May 30, 1974 (#74002250) | 545 St. Charles Ave. 29°56′47″N 90°04′17″W | Former City Hall |
| 54 | Gallier House | Gallier House | February 15, 1974 (#74000932) | 1132 Royal Street; 29°57′41″N 90°03′41″W | Built by architect James Gallier, Jr., in 1857 for his own family residence, now operated as a historic house museum. |
| 55 | Garden District | Garden District | June 21, 1971 (#71000358) | Bounded by Carondelet, Josephine, and Magazine Streets, and Louisiana Ave. 29°55′45″N 90°05′02″W | |
| 56 | Gem Theater | Gem Theater | January 26, 2016 (#15001002) | 3940 Thalia St. 29°57′08″N 90°05′51″W | Now the Zony Mash Beer Project |
| 57 | Mary Louise Kennedy Genella House | Mary Louise Kennedy Genella House | November 10, 1982 (#82000446) | 5022–5028 Prytania St. 29°55′28″N 90°06′34″W | |
| 58 | General Laundry Building | General Laundry Building | December 27, 1974 (#74000933) | 2512 St. Peter St. 29°58′05″N 90°04′53″W | Aztec Revival Deco commercial building |
| 59 | Gentilly Terrace Historic District | Gentilly Terrace Historic District | November 18, 1999 (#99001358) | Roughly bounded by Spain, Mirabeau, Eastern, and Gentilly Boulevard; 30°00′18″N 90°03′05″W | |
| 60 | Nicholas Girod House | Nicholas Girod House | April 15, 1970 (#70000254) | 500 Chartres St. 29°57′21″N 90°03′54″W | Originally constructed in 1797, later owned by Mayor Nicolas Girod who refurbished it in preparation for a never-realized plan to rescue of Napoleon from his exile. Building commonly known as the Napoleon House, now a noted restaurant and bar. |
| 61 | The Governor House Motor Hotel | The Governor House Motor Hotel | May 31, 2016 (#16000298) | 1630 Canal St. 29°57′31″N 90°04′39″W | |
| 62 | Grant-Black House | Grant-Black House | July 26, 1979 (#79001074) | 3932 St. Charles Ave. 29°55′35″N 90°05′50″W | |
| 63 | Greenville Hall | Greenville Hall | August 29, 1977 (#77000673) | 7214 St. Charles Ave. 29°56′13″N 90°07′39″W | Formerly part of Dominican College campus, now part of Loyola University New Orleans |
| 64 | Sophie Gumbel Training School | Sophie Gumbel Training School | March 17, 2025 (#100011527) | 5600 Loyola Avenue; 29°55′58″N 90°06′56″W | |
| 65 | John Hancock Building | John Hancock Building | July 13, 2017 (#100001313) | 1055 St. Charles Ave. 29°56′33″N 90°04′23″W | Better known locally as "K&B Plaza". |
| 66 | Hart House | Hart House | June 7, 1984 (#84001339) | 2108 Palmer Ave. 29°56′13″N 90°07′06″W | |
| 67 | Lafcadio Hearn House | Lafcadio Hearn House | April 26, 2006 (#06000324) | 1565–67 Cleveland Ave. 29°57′34″N 90°04′39″W | Former residence of writer Lafcadio Hearn |
| 68 | Murray Henderson Elementary School | | September 27, 2022 (#100008238) | 1912 L.B. Landry Ln. 29°56′02″N 90°02′29″W | |
| 69 | Hennen Building | Hennen Building | July 31, 1986 (#86002104) | 203 Carondelet; 29°57′09″N 90°04′17″W | Hennen Building, also known as Latter & Blum Building, Maritime Building; early high-rise from 1895 |
| 70 | Hermann-Grima House | Hermann-Grima House | August 19, 1971 (#71000359) | 818–820 St. Louis St. 29°57′26″N 90°04′04″W | Early example (1831) of American architecture in the French Quarter, operated as an historic house museum. Has the only extant horse stable and open-hearth kitchen. |
| 71 | Simon Hernsheim House | Simon Hernsheim House | June 24, 1982 (#82002784) | 3811 St. Charles Ave. 29°55′38″N 90°05′46″W | Now houses the Columns Hotel |
| 72 | Holiday Inn Highrise East | Holiday Inn Highrise East | January 31, 2019 (#100003077) | 6324 Chef Menteur Highway; 30°00′36″N 90°00′50″W | |
| 73 | Hollygrove Historic District | Hollygrove Historic District | October 25, 2024 (#100009397) | Roughly bounded by Airline Hwy., South Claiborne, South Carrollton, and Monticello Aves. 29°57′52″N 90°07′16″W | |
| 74 | Holy Cross Historic District | Holy Cross Historic District | July 31, 1986 (#86002105) | Roughly bounded by Burgundy and Dauphine Sts., Delery St., the Mississippi River, and the Industrial Canal; 29°57′26″N 90°01′08″W | |
| 75 | Houses at 3014-3038 Leonidas Street | Houses at 3014-3038 Leonidas Street | July 6, 2021 (#100006724) | 3014-3038 Leonidas St. 29°57′51″N 90°07′11″W | |
| 76 | Howard Memorial Library | Howard Memorial Library | March 22, 1991 (#91000343) | 615 Howard Ave. 29°56′34″N 90°04′17″W | |
| 77 | Iberville Public Housing Development Historic District | Iberville Public Housing Development Historic District | January 5, 2015 (#14000692) | 401 Treme St. 29°57′34″N 90°04′25″W | |
| 78 | International Trade Mart | International Trade Mart | June 9, 2014 (#13001127) | 2 Canal Street; 29°56′56″N 90°03′48″W | |
| 79 | Irish Channel Area Architectural District | Irish Channel Area Architectural District | September 29, 1976 (#76000967) | Roughly bounded by Jackson Ave., Aline and Magazine Sts., and the Mississippi River; 29°55′20″N 90°04′51″W | |
| 80 | Iroquois Theater | Iroquois Theater | January 14, 2003 (#02001161) | 413–415 S. Rampart St. 29°57′09″N 90°04′30″W | |
| 81 | Isaacs-Williams Mansion | Isaacs-Williams Mansion | October 21, 1976 (#76000968) | 5120 St. Charles Ave. 29°55′35″N 90°06′38″W | Milton Latter Memorial Library |
| 82 | Jackson Barracks | Jackson Barracks | November 7, 1976 (#76000969) | 6400 St. Claude Avenue; 29°57′04″N 90°00′37″W | |
| 83 | Jackson Square | Jackson Square | October 15, 1966 (#66000375) | Bounded by Decatur, St. Peter, St. Ann, and Chartres Sts. 29°57′26″N 90°03′47″W | Central square of the Vieux Carré, historically called the Place d'Armes (Plaza de Armas). Redesigned as a public park and renamed in the mid-19th century, by Micaela Almonester, Baroness de Pontalba. |
| 84 | Henry Jones Cottage | Henry Jones Cottage | October 6, 2015 (#15000696) | 2409–2411 D'Abadie St. 29°58′45″N 90°04′18″W | |
| 85 | Julia Street Row | Julia Street Row | March 28, 1977 (#77000674) | 602–646 Julia St. 29°56′43″N 90°04′16″W | Intact block-long row of matching, early 19th-century brick townhouses |
| 86 | Jung Hotel | Jung Hotel | September 27, 1982 (#82002785) | 1500 Canal St. 29°57′25″N 90°04′34″W | |
| 87 | Karnofsky Tailor Shop-House | Karnofsky Tailor Shop-House | October 16, 2002 (#02001162) | 427–431 S. Rampart St. 29°57′02″N 90°04′30″W | Karnofsky family active in early promotion of jazz; location of early employment of young Louis Armstrong. Destroyed by Hurricane Ida in 2021. |
| 88 | Lafayette Cemetery No. 1 | Lafayette Cemetery No. 1 | February 1, 1972 (#72000559) | 1400 Washington Ave. 29°55′43″N 90°05′07″W | |
| 89 | Lafitte Avenue Project Buildings C-47, E-45 and No. 46 | Lafitte Avenue Project Buildings C-47, E-45 and No. 46 | May 31, 2016 (#15001003) | Corner of Lafitte Ave. & N. Johnson St. 29°57′56″N 90°04′40″W | |
| 90 | Lafitte's Blacksmith Shop | Lafitte's Blacksmith Shop | April 15, 1970 (#70000255) | 941 Bourbon Street; 29°57′39″N 90°03′50″W | Late 18th-century Creole cottage, became a bar in the 20th century. |
| 91 | LeBeuf Plantation House | LeBeuf Plantation House | July 29, 1993 (#93000694) | 101 Carmick, US Naval Support Activity; 29°56′56″N 90°01′50″W | |
| 92 | LeCarpentier-Beauregard-Keyes House | LeCarpentier-Beauregard-Keyes House | November 20, 1975 (#75000853) | 1113 Chartres St. 29°57′39″N 90°03′40″W | Former residence of General P. G. T. Beauregard and author Frances Parkinson Keyes |
| 93 | Leeds Iron Foundry | Leeds Iron Foundry | January 11, 1976 (#76000970) | 923 Tchoupitoulas Street; 29°56′33″N 90°04′05″W | Gothic revival commercial building with many links to New Orleans history; now houses the Preservation Resource Center. |
| 94 | Lincoln Beach | Lincoln Beach | July 10, 2024 (#100009216) | 13835 and 14000 Hayne Blvd. 30°04′09″N 89°57′06″W | |
| 95 | Huey P. Long Mansion | Huey P. Long Mansion | June 9, 1980 (#80001744) | 14 Audubon Boulevard; 29°56′35″N 90°07′11″W | Former residence of Governor Huey P. Long |
| 96 | Longue Vue House and Gardens | Longue Vue House and Gardens | September 20, 1991 (#91001419) | 7 Bamboo Road; 29°58′36″N 90°07′23″W | Early 20th-century city estate and gardens, open to the public |
| 97 | Louisiana Coca-Cola Bottling Company Plant | Louisiana Coca-Cola Bottling Company Plant | October 8, 2020 (#100005685) | 1050 South Jefferson Davis Pkwy. 29°57′34″N 90°06′10″W | |
| 98 | Louisiana State Bank Building | Louisiana State Bank Building | May 4, 1983 (#83004387) | 403–409 Royal Street; 29°57′20″N 90°04′01″W | The last structure designed by Benjamin Henry Latrobe |
| 99 | Louisiana Superdome | Louisiana Superdome | January 26, 2016 (#15001004) | 1500 Sugar Bowl Dr. 29°57′03″N 90°04′54″W | |
| 100 | Lowe-Forman House | Lowe-Forman House | June 29, 1982 (#82002786) | 5301 Camp St. 29°55′18″N 90°06′47″W | |
| 101 | Lower Garden District | Lower Garden District | September 7, 1972 (#72000560) | Roughly bounded by St. Charles Ave., Jackson St., the Mississippi River, and Annunciation and Race Sts.; also roughly the southern side of St. Charles Ave. between U.S. Route 90 and Josephine St. and two parcels on the southern side of Annunciation St. 29°55′55″N 90°04′15″W | Second set of boundaries represents a boundary increase of July 26, 1990 |
| 102 | Lykes Brothers Steamship Company Historic District | Lykes Brothers Steamship Company Historic District | November 14, 2011 (#11000804) | 1770, 1744–46 Tchoupitoulas Street; 29°55′39″N 90°04′00″W | |
| 103 | Macheca Building | Macheca Building | January 6, 1983 (#83000531) | 828 Canal St. 29°57′14″N 90°04′15″W | |
| 104 | Madame John's Legacy | Madame John's Legacy | April 15, 1970 (#70000256) | 632 Dumaine St. 29°57′32″N 90°03′46″W | Late 18th-century French Colonial house, rare architectural example which escaped the Great Fires of 1788 and 1794; operated by the Louisiana State Museum. Name is from a story by George Washington Cable. |
| 105 | Magnolia Street Housing Project | Magnolia Street Housing Project | August 27, 1999 (#99001038) | Roughly bounded by Washington Ave., La Salle St., Louisiana Ave., and Magnolia St. 29°56′16″N 90°05′34″W | |
| 106 | Maylie's Restaurant | Maylie's Restaurant | June 3, 1998 (#98000577) | 1007–09 Poydras St. 29°57′02″N 90°04′28″W | |
| 107 | McDonogh School No. 6 | McDonogh School No. 6 | October 5, 1982 (#82000447) | 4849 Chestnut St. 29°55′22″N 90°06′27″W | |
| 108 | McDonogh 19 Elementary School | McDonogh 19 Elementary School | October 10, 2016 (#16000672) | 5909 St. Claude Ave. 29°57′38″N 90°00′45″W | |
| 109 | Merieult House | Merieult House | May 5, 1972 (#72000561) | 533 Royal Street; 29°57′24″N 90°03′57″W | |
| 110 | Metairie Cemetery | Metairie Cemetery | December 6, 1991 (#91001780) | Junction of Interstate 10 and Metairie Road; 29°58′54″N 90°07′05″W | |
| 111 | Methodist Home Hospital | Methodist Home Hospital | January 31, 2017 (#100000599) | 821 Washington Ave. 29°55′26″N 90°04′51″W | |
| 112 | Adolph Meyer School | Adolph Meyer School | February 1, 2016 (#15001013) | 2013 General Meyer Ave. 29°56′41″N 90°02′10″W | |
| 113 | Mid-City Historic District | Mid-City Historic District | December 10, 1993 (#93001394) | Roughly bounded by Derbigny St., Conti St., City Park Ave., and Interstate 10; also roughly bounded by City Park Ave., St. Louis St., Claiborne Ave., and Interstate 10; 29°58′08″N 90°05′45″W | Second set of boundaries represents a significant boundary adjustment of December 15, 2011 |
| 114 | Napoleon Street Branch Library | Napoleon Street Branch Library | January 12, 1979 (#79001075) | Napoleon St. 29°55′16″N 90°06′04″W | |
| 115 | National American Bank Building | National American Bank Building | May 15, 1986 (#86001048) | 200 Carondelet Street; 29°57′08″N 90°04′14″W | |
| 116 | Médard Nelson Home and School | Médard Nelson Home and School | January 6, 2021 (#100005998) | 1218-1220 Burgundy St. 29°57′51″N 90°03′49″W | |
| 117 | New Marigny Historic District | New Marigny Historic District | September 30, 1994 (#94001170) | Roughly bounded by St. Claude, St. Bernard, Tonti, and St. Ferdinand Sts. and Interstate 10; 29°58′27″N 90°03′17″W | |
| 118 | New Orleans City Park Carousel and Pavilion | New Orleans City Park Carousel and Pavilion | February 13, 1986 (#86000254) | City Park, off City Park Ave. 29°59′15″N 90°05′57″W | |
| 119 | New Orleans Cotton Exchange Building | New Orleans Cotton Exchange Building | December 22, 1977 (#77000675) | 231 Carondelet Street; 29°57′07″N 90°04′17″W | |
| 120 | New Orleans Federal Savings and Loan Building | New Orleans Federal Savings and Loan Building | June 16, 2015 (#15000346) | 4948 Chef Menteur Hwy. 30°00′14″N 90°02′20″W | |
| 121 | New Orleans Jazz National Historical Park | New Orleans Jazz National Historical Park | October 31, 1994 (#01000277) | 365 Canal St. 29°57′45″N 90°04′02″W | |
| 122 | New Orleans Lower Central Business District | New Orleans Lower Central Business District | June 24, 1991 (#91000825) | Roughly bounded by Canal, Tchoupitoulas, Poydras, O'Keefe, Common, and S. Saratoga; also approximately Rampart, Tulane, Loyola, Gravier, O'Keefe, and Common; also 234 and 222 Loyola and 1100 Tulane Aves., 300, 306, 308, 310, and 314 Rampart, 1111 and 935 Gravier, and 1010 Common Sts. 29°57′08″N 90°04′17″W | Second and third sets of boundaries represent boundary increases of February 9, 2006 and January 20, 2015 respectively |
| 123 | Newberger House | Newberger House | September 27, 1984 (#84001340) | 1640 Palmer Ave. 29°55′58″N 90°07′11″W | |
| 124 | Norwegian Seamen's Church | Norwegian Seamen's Church | April 17, 2020 (#100005186) | 1758–1772 Prytania St. 29°56′09″N 90°04′33″W | |
| 125 | Odd Fellows Rest Cemetery | Odd Fellows Rest Cemetery | May 23, 1980 (#80001745) | Canal St. and City Park Ave. 29°58′53″N 90°06′39″W | |
| 126 | ODECO Building | ODECO Building | May 31, 2016 (#16000300) | 1600 Canal St. 29°57′30″N 90°04′38″W | |
| 127 | Oil and Gas Building | Oil and Gas Building | February 5, 2014 (#13001143) | 1100 Tulane Ave. 29°57′14″N 90°04′27″W | |
| 128 | Old Handleman Building | Old Handleman Building | June 11, 1980 (#80001746) | 1824–1832 Dryades St. (Oretha Castle Haley Boulevard); 29°56′18″N 90°04′51″W | |
| 129 | Old Meat Market-Halle des Boucheries | Old Meat Market-Halle des Boucheries | March 29, 1972 (#72000562) | 800 Decatur Street; 29°56′22″N 90°03′44″W | Historic building of French Market complex |
| 130 | Old Ursuline Convent | Old Ursuline Convent | October 15, 1966 (#66000376) | 1114 Chartres St. 29°57′37″N 90°03′39″W | Colonial-era convent complex, later Archbishop's Palace |
| 131 | One Shell Square | One Shell Square | October 18, 2018 (#100003027) | 701 Poydras St. 29°57′01″N 90°04′16″W | |
| 132 | Orpheum Theatre | Orpheum Theatre | August 11, 1982 (#82002787) | 125–129 University Pl. 29°57′16″N 90°04′21″W | |
| 133 | Our Lady of Lourdes Parish Complex | Our Lady of Lourdes Parish Complex | April 7, 2022 (#100007587) | 2400 Napoleon Ave. 29°56′04″N 90°06′11″W | |
| 134 | Pan-American Life Insurance Company Building | Pan-American Life Insurance Company Building | September 19, 2007 (#07000982) | 2400 Canal St. 29°57′52″N 90°05′06″W | |
| 135 | Park View Guest House | Park View Guest House | November 5, 1982 (#82000448) | 7004 St. Charles Avenue; 29°56′08″N 90°07′33″W | |
| 136 | Parkview Historic District | Parkview Historic District | June 9, 1995 (#95000675) | Roughly bounded by City Park Ave., Bayou St. John, Orleans, Rocheblave, Lafitte, and St. Louis; 29°58′40″N 90°05′33″W | |
| 137 | Perseverance Benevolent and Mutual Aid Society Hall | Perseverance Benevolent and Mutual Aid Society Hall | June 22, 2018 (#100002583) | 1644 Villere St. 29°58′16″N 90°03′48″W | Society music and dance hall. Collapsed in demolition by neglect August 2022. |
| 138 | Perseverance Hall | Perseverance Hall | October 2, 1973 (#73000871) | 901 St. Claude Ave. 29°57′46″N 90°04′04″W | |
| 139 | Pessou House | Pessou House | June 15, 1982 (#82002788) | 6018 Benjamin St. 29°55′47″N 90°07′09″W | Formerly owned by Carrie Pessou, also known as the Clement House |
| 140 | Pitot House | Pitot House | September 28, 1971 (#71000360) | 1440 Moss St. 29°58′54″N 90°05′21″W | Late 18th-century house; one of the owners was Mayor James Pitot. Open to the public and home to the Louisiana Landmarks Society. |
| 141 | Plaza Tower | Plaza Tower | January 30, 2013 (#12001241) | 1001 Howard Ave. 29°56′47″N 90°04′34″W | |
| 142 | Pontalba Buildings | Pontalba Buildings | May 30, 1974 (#74000934) | 500 St. Ann St. and 500 St. Peter St. 29°57′27″N 90°03′46″W | c. 1850 matching townhouse buildings with first-floor retail shops; on either side of Jackson Square, constructed by New Orleans native Micaela Almonester, Baroness de Pontalba |
| 143 | Pontchartrain Park Historic District | Pontchartrain Park Historic District | June 23, 2020 (#100005306) | Roughly bounded by France Rd., Dwyer Canal, Norfolk Southern RR, Campus Blvd., Emmitt W. Bashful Blvd., Press Dr., and Hayne Blvd. 30°01′19″N 90°02′25″W | |
| 144 | The Presbytere | The Presbytere | April 15, 1970 (#70000257) | 751 Chartres St. 29°57′29″N 90°03′50″W | Colonial-era Roman Catholic headquarters for the Louisiana colony; now a property of the Louisiana State Museum, on Jackson Square |
| 145 | Alfred C. Priestley Junior High School | Alfred C. Priestley Junior High School | February 21, 2018 (#100002115) | 1601 Leonidas St. 29°57′15″N 90°07′49″W | |
| 146 | Jean Louis Rabassa House | Jean Louis Rabassa House | February 15, 1974 (#74000935) | 1125 St. Ann St. 29°57′42″N 90°04′04″W | |
| 147 | The Rault Center | The Rault Center | January 20, 2015 (#14001171) | 1111 Gravier St. 29°57′12″N 90°04′28″W | |
| 148 | Rice House | Rice House | August 24, 1978 (#78001430) | 3643 Camp St. 29°55′21″N 90°05′44″W | |
| 149 | Saenger Theatre | Saenger Theatre | November 25, 1977 (#77000676) | 1111 Canal Street; also 1101–1111 Canal St. 29°57′21″N 90°04′22″W | Second set of boundaries represents a boundary increase of April 1, 1985 |
| 150 | St. Alphonsus Church | St. Alphonsus Church | May 22, 1973 (#73000872) | 2029 Constance St. 29°55′50″N 90°04′25″W | |
| 151 | St. Bernard Market | St. Bernard Market | August 15, 2012 (#12000498) | 1522 St. Bernard Ave. 29°58′20″N 90°03′56″W | |
| 152 | St. Charles Streetcar Line | St. Charles Streetcar Line | May 23, 1973 (#73000873) | St. Charles Avenue route from downtown to Carrollton; also St. Charles Ave., Carondelet St., Canal St., Howard Ave., Lee Cir., Carrollton Ave., Willow St., and Jeanette St. 29°56′27″N 90°06′08″W | Second set of boundaries represent National Historic Landmark designation and boundary increase of August 25, 2014, "The St. Charles Line" |
| 153 | St. Claude General Hospital | St. Claude General Hospital | July 9, 2024 (#100010515) | 3419 St. Claude Avenue; 29°58′01″N 90°02′24″W | former hospital and nursing home, long known as "St. Margaret's". |
| 154 | St. James AME Church | St. James AME Church | October 26, 1982 (#82000449) | 222 N. Roman St. 29°57′39″N 90°04′43″W | |
| 155 | St. Louis Cemetery No. 1 | St. Louis Cemetery No. 1 | July 30, 1975 (#75000855) | Bounded by Basin, St. Louis, Conti, and Tremé Sts. 29°57′25″N 90°04′34″W | |
| 156 | St. Louis Cemetery No. 2 | St. Louis Cemetery No. 2 | July 30, 1975 (#75000856) | Bounded by Claiborne, Robertson, St. Louis, and Iberville St. 29°57′38″N 90°04′32″W | |
| 157 | St. Mary's Assumption Church | St. Mary's Assumption Church | August 12, 1971 (#71000361) | 2030 Constance St. 29°55′45″N 90°04′29″W | |
| 158 | St. Patrick's Church | St. Patrick's Church | May 30, 1974 (#74000936) | 724 Camp St. 29°56′48″N 90°04′11″W | |
| 159 | St. Peter A.M.E. Church | St. Peter A.M.E. Church | March 21, 1979 (#79001077) | 1201 Cadiz St. 29°55′24″N 90°06′14″W | |
| 160 | St. Vincent De Paul Roman Catholic Church | St. Vincent De Paul Roman Catholic Church | April 13, 1976 (#76000971) | 3051 Dauphine St. 29°57′52″N 90°02′46″W | |
| 161 | Jean Marie Saux Building | Jean Marie Saux Building | January 12, 1983 (#83000532) | 900 City Park Ave. 29°58′59″N 90°05′51″W | |
| 162 | Schwegmann Bros. Giant Supermarket No. 1 | Schwegmann Bros. Giant Supermarket No. 1 | June 11, 2014 (#14000314) | 222 St. Claude Ave. 29°58′07″N 90°03′22″W | |
| 163 | Shell Building | Shell Building | February 22, 2002 (#02000039) | 925 Common St. 29°57′20″N 90°04′23″W | |
| 164 | Louis Sincer House | Louis Sincer House | July 12, 1978 (#78001431) | 1061 Camp St. 29°56′30″N 90°04′19″W | |
| 165 | Sister Stanislaus Memorial Building | Sister Stanislaus Memorial Building | December 5, 2003 (#03001233) | 450 S. Claiborne Ave. 29°57′18″N 90°04′50″W | |
| 166 | Sommerville-Kearney House | Sommerville-Kearney House | December 29, 1978 (#78003449) | 1401 Delachaise St. 29°55′31″N 90°05′28″W | |
| 167 | South Lakeview Historic District | South Lakeview Historic District | May 9, 2002 (#02000465) | Bounded roughly by Navarre St., Gen. Diaz, Weiblen, and Hawthorne Pl. 29°59′23″N 90°06′33″W | |
| 168 | Southern Railway Freight Office | Southern Railway Freight Office | December 6, 2004 (#04001338) | 1201 St. Louis St. 29°57′34″N 90°04′14″W | Also known as "Basin Street Station" |
| 169 | Standard Coffee Company Warehouse and Factory | Standard Coffee Company Warehouse and Factory | October 6, 2015 (#15000697) | 450 Mandeville St. 29°57′45″N 90°03′14″W | |
| 170 | Straight University Boarding House and Dining Hall | Straight University Boarding House and Dining Hall | March 4, 2011 (#11000074) | 1423 N. Claiborne Avenue; 29°58′12″N 90°04′07″W | |
| 171 | Tecumseh (towboat) | | March 13, 1996 (#96000202) | Toulouse Street Wharf; 29°57′16″N 90°03′43″W | |
| 172 | Tewell House | Tewell House | November 21, 1978 (#78001432) | 1503 Valence St. 29°55′31″N 90°06′20″W | |
| 173 | Texaco Building | Texaco Building | August 23, 2006 (#06000715) | 1501 Canal Street; 29°57′35″N 90°04′30″W | |
| 174 | Texaco Service Station | Texaco Service Station | October 4, 2017 (#100001711) | 3060 St. Claude Ave. 29°58′03″N 90°02′40″W | |
| 175 | Touro-Shakspeare Home | | December 8, 2021 (#100007235) | 2621 General Meyer Ave. 29°56′34″N 90°01′42″W | |
| 176 | Treme Market | Treme Market | October 11, 2016 (#16000711) | 1508 Orleans Ave. 29°57′51″N 90°04′22″W | |
| 177 | Tulane University of Louisiana | Tulane University of Louisiana | March 24, 1978 (#78001433) | St. Charles Avenue, South Claiborne, Broadway, and Calhoun Sts. 29°56′19″N 90°07′18″W | Private, nonsectarian research university; founded in 1834 as a medical college and later renamed for Paul Tulane, merged with Sophie Newcomb College. |
| 178 | A.P. Tureaud, Sr. House | A.P. Tureaud, Sr. House | August 21, 2006 (#06000742) | 3121 Pauger St. 29°59′01″N 90°03′41″W | |
| 179 | Turner's Hall | Turner's Hall | November 2, 1982 (#82000450) | 606 O'Keefe St. 29°56′55″N 90°04′28″W | |
| 180 | Turpin-Kofler-Buja House | Turpin-Kofler-Buja House | May 8, 1973 (#73000874) | 2319 Magazine St. 29°55′43″N 90°04′42″W | |
| 181 | U.S. Court of Appeals-Fifth Circuit | U.S. Court of Appeals-Fifth Circuit | February 15, 1974 (#74000937) | 600 Camp St. 29°56′52″N 90°04′45″W | 1909 Art Nouveau courthouse and former post office; many key civil rights cases heard and decided here in mid-20th century |
| 182 | U.S. Customhouse | U.S. Customhouse | July 17, 1974 (#74000938) | 423 Canal Street; 29°57′06″N 90°03′58″W | Egyptian Revival Federal Building, now houses the Audubon Insectorium. Constructed between 1848 and 1881, due to design changes and the interruption of the Civil War. |
| 183 | U.S. Mint, New Orleans Branch | U.S. Mint, New Orleans Branch | March 30, 1973 (#73000875) | 420 Esplanade Avenue; 29°57′40″N 90°03′29″W | Built in 1835, former branch U.S. Mint and briefly a C.S.A. mint. Decommissioned in 1911, the building is now one of the Louisiana State Museum's French Quarter properties. |
| 184 | U.S. Naval Station Algiers Historic District | U.S. Naval Station Algiers Historic District | September 11, 2013 (#13000695) | Roughly bounded by Mississippi R. levee, Heerman, Constitution & Carmick Sts. 29°56′57″N 90°01′58″W | |
| 185 | U.S. Quarantine Station | U.S. Quarantine Station | December 9, 2019 (#100004767) | 3819 Patterson Dr. 29°56′34″N 90°00′55″W | |
| 186 | Union Bethel A.M.E. Church | Union Bethel A.M.E. Church | September 24, 2007 (#07001003) | 2321 Thalia; 29°56′38″N 90°04′57″W | |
| 187 | Upper Central Business District | Upper Central Business District | August 10, 1990 (#90001231) | Roughly bounded by O'Keefe, Poydras, Convention Center Boulevard, the Expressway (U.S. Route 90 Business), and Howard Ave; also the junction of Howard and St. Charles Aves. and along O'Keefe Ave. and Poydras St.; also roughly bounded by O'Keefe, Poydras, Convention Center Boulevard, U.S. Route 90, and Howard Ave. 29°56′40″N 90°04′09″W | Second and third sets of boundaries represent boundary increases of August 12, 1993 and August 6, 2008 respectively |
| 188 | Uptown New Orleans Historic District | Uptown New Orleans Historic District | July 3, 1985 (#85001417) | Roughly bounded by Louisiana, Claiborne, Lowerline, and the Mississippi River; 29°55′42″N 90°06′49″W | |
| 189 | U.S. Army Supply Base New Orleans | U.S. Army Supply Base New Orleans | February 1, 2016 (#15001014) | 4400 Dauphine St. 29°57′41″N 90°01′55″W | |
| 190 | Vieux Carre Historic District | Vieux Carre Historic District | October 15, 1966 (#66000377) | Bounded by the Mississippi River, Rampart and Canal Sts., and Esplanade Ave. 29°57′26″N 90°03′50″W | Original city as designed by French colonial officials in the early 18th century |
| 191 | Walker House | Walker House | May 15, 1986 (#86001057) | 1912 St. Charles Ave. 29°56′07″N 90°04′41″W | |
| 192 | Wembley Industries, Inc | Wembley Industries, Inc | June 22, 2026 (#100013159) | 3949 Euphrosine Street; 29°57′24″N 90°05′49″W | Former factory for Wembley neckties |
| 193 | White Rock Saloon | White Rock Saloon | January 10, 2022 (#100007295) | 1216 Bienville St. 29°57′30″N 90°04′21″W | Bar & musician's hangout in Storyville era; aka Frank Early's Saloon |
| 194 | Whitney National Bank (Poydras Branch) | Whitney National Bank (Poydras Branch) | January 18, 1985 (#85000093) | Poydras and Camp Sts. 29°56′59″N 90°04′11″W | |
| 195 | Xavier University Main Building, Convent and Library | Xavier University Main Building, Convent and Library | March 3, 2004 (#04000114) | 1 Drexel Dr. 29°57′57″N 90°06′26″W | |

== Former listings ==
| | Name on the Register | Image | Date listed | Date removed | Location | Description |
|---|---|---|---|---|---|---|
| 1 | USS Cabot (CVL-28) | USS Cabot (CVL-28) | June 21, 1990 (#90000334) | July 8, 2001 | Foot of Jackson St. 29°55′21″N 90°04′12″W | Aircraft carrier which has been scrapped and no longer exists |
| 2 | Canal Station | Canal Station | February 4, 1993 (#92001873) | March 31, 2015 | 2819 Canal St. 29°58′16″N 90°05′34″W | Streetcar and bus barn and repair facility |
| 3 | Robert E. Lee Monument | Robert E. Lee Monument | March 19, 1991 (#91000254) | November 6, 2024 | Lee Cir., in the 900–1000 blocks of St. Charles Ave. 29°56′35″N 90°04′20″W | Monument in Lee Circle commemorating Gen. Robert E. Lee. Erected in 1884; statue by Alexander Doyle. Removed in May 2017. |
| 4 | New Canal Lighthouse | New Canal Lighthouse | December 30, 1985 (#85003186) | July 13, 2011 | West End Boulevard and Lakeshore Dr. 30°01′36″N 90°06′47″W | Built in 1890/1901, it was seriously damaged in 2005 by Hurricanes Katrina and Rita. However, the old lighthouse has been reconstructed, as of 2013. |
| 5 | Booker T. Washington High School and Auditorium | Booker T. Washington High School and Auditorium | July 17, 2002 (#02000803) | June 12, 2017 | 1201 S. Roman; 29°57′05″N 90°05′20″W | |

== See also ==
- History of New Orleans
- Buildings and architecture of New Orleans
- List of National Historic Landmarks in Louisiana
- National Register of Historic Places listings in Louisiana
