= Iroquois Theater (New Orleans) =

Historic theater in New Orleans, US

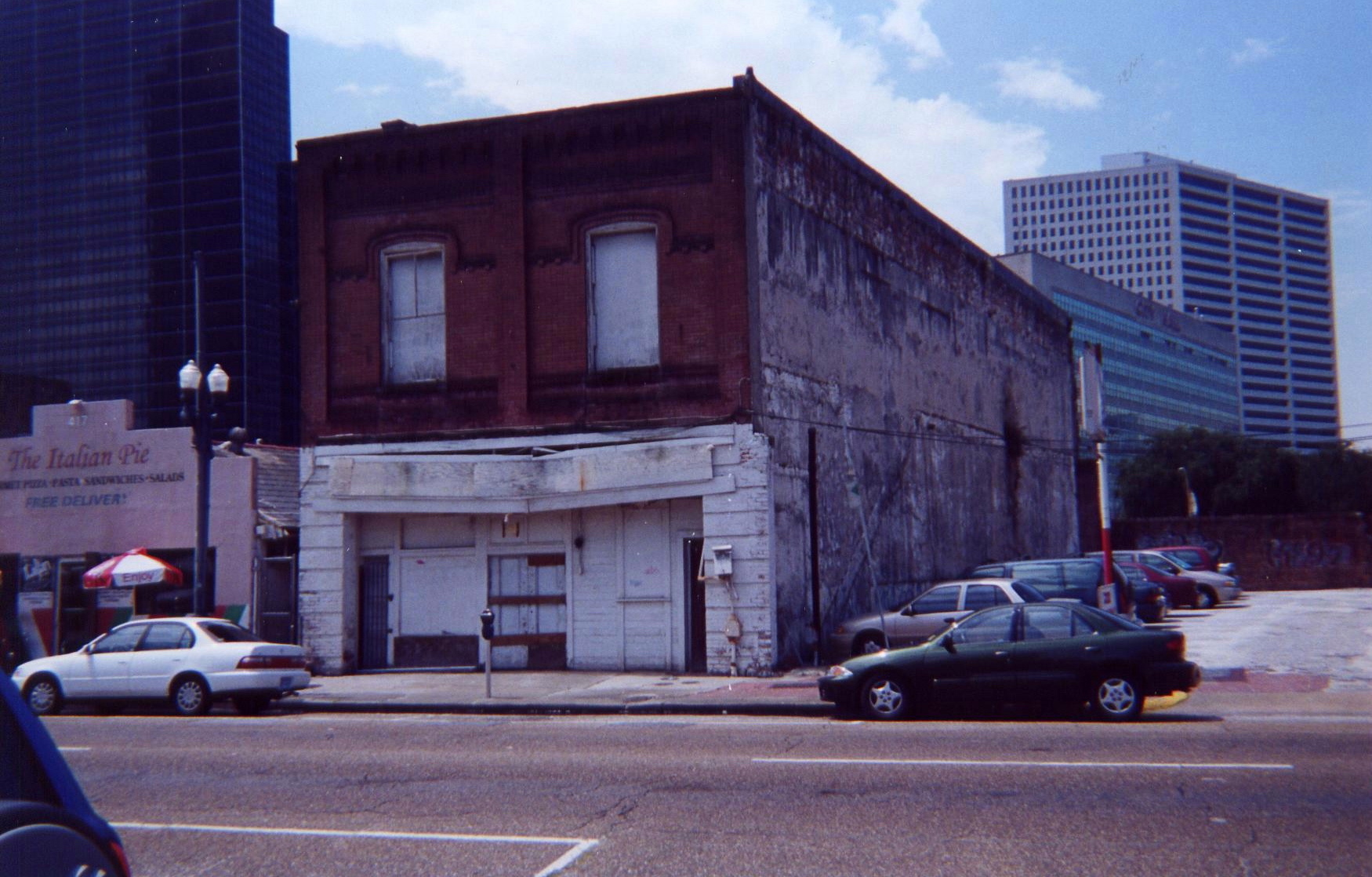
The Iroquois Theater in 2002

The Iroquois Theater is a former music hall in New Orleans, Louisiana. Opened in 1912, it was an important venue for early jazz performers and an important site in the development and history of jazz. It is listed on the National Register of Historic Places.

The building is located at 413 South Rampart Street in the historic "Back of Town" neighborhood, adjacent to the former Storyville area and now considered part of the New Orleans Central Business District (CBD).

The Iroquois site is listed on the National Register of Historic Places, alongside the nearby Little Gem Saloon, the Karnofsky Tailor Shop–House, and the Eagle Saloon for hosting African-American jazz performers in the early 20th century.

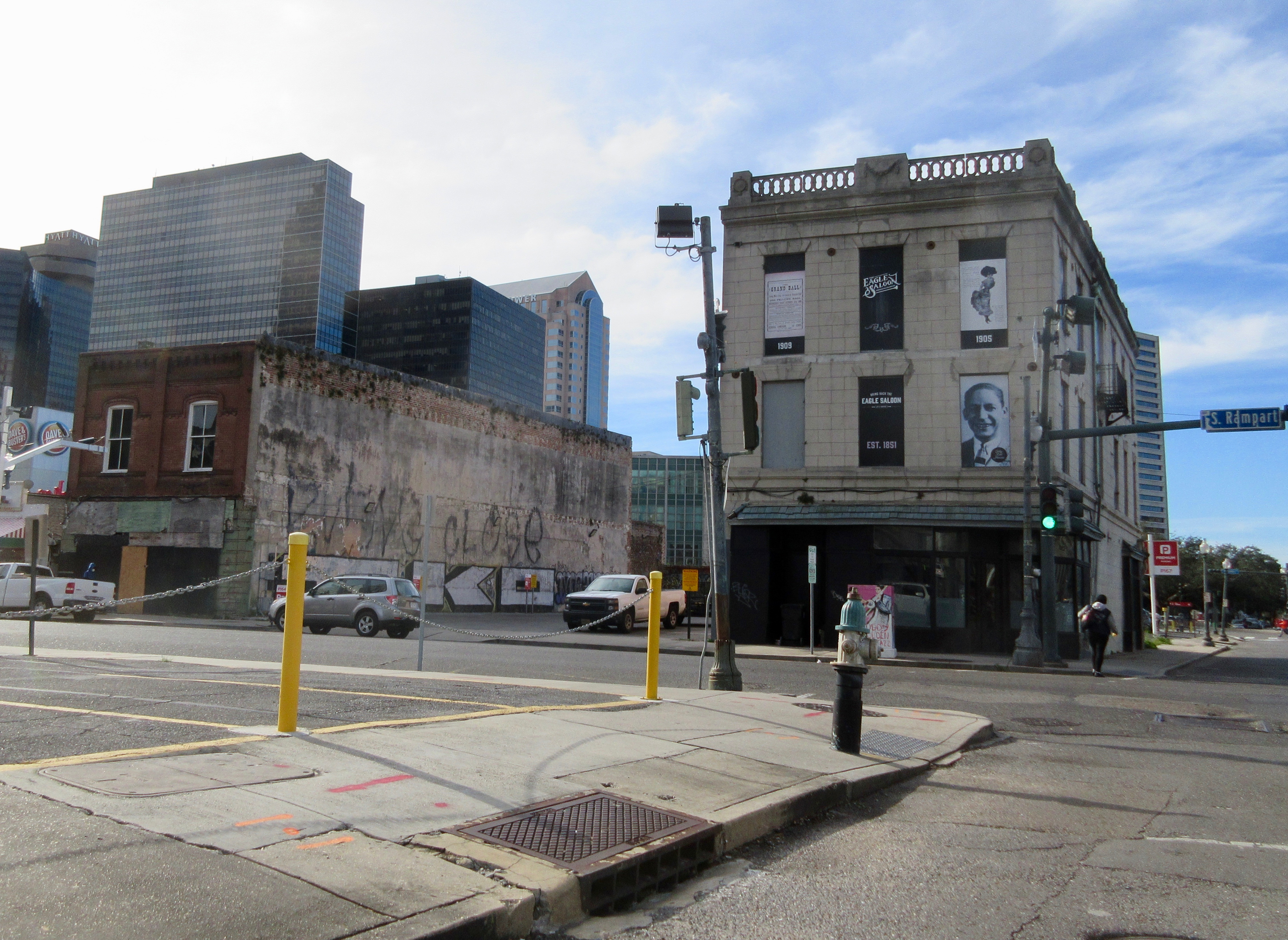
Iroquois Theater and Eagle Saloon buildings, South Rampart Street, New Orleans, 2022

The larger Lyric Theater succeeded the Iroquois from 1919 to 1927.

== See also ==
- Dixieland jazz
- National Register of Historic Places listings in Orleans Parish, Louisiana
