= William H. Quasha =

American lawyer (1912–1996)

- Born: William Howard Quasha; 19 May 1912; Manhattan, New York, US
- Died: 12 May 1996 (aged 83); St. Luke's Medical Center, Quezon City, Metro Manila, Philippines
- Education: St. John's University, 1936
- Spouses: Arvie Leath Solomon (m. 1932–1946); Isabel Abad Santos Quasha
- Children: 4

William Howard Quasha (May 19, 1912 – May 12, 1996) was an American lawyer, industrial psychologist and mechanical engineer. Serving in the Pacific Theater on the staff of Douglas MacArthur, Quasha remained in the Philippines following the end of World War II and founded William H. Quasha & Associates.

== Early life and education ==
Quasha was born on May 19, 1912, in Manhattan, New York, to Morris Quasha, a Russian-born lawyer, and Rose Quasha, who was born in Vawkavysk (present-day Belarus).

In 1933, Quasha earned his Bachelor of Science in electrical engineering and his Master of Science in 1935. The following year, he graduated from St. John's University with his law degree.

== Career ==
Following graduation, Quasha began practicing law in New York. In 1942, Quasha joined the United States Army. He was a lieutenant colonel and lawyer with Douglas MacArthur's staff. While in the army, he served as an enemy property custodian and war crimes prosecutor; he worked for the U.S. government to protect its holdings in the Philippines. He reviewed legal contracts and was responsible for preparing decisions on contractual claims against the government. Together with other officers, he determined the validity and extent of these claims. He was responsible for liaisons between the U.S. Army Supply Arms and Services and the Commonwealth of Australia. He received a Bronze Star Medal with one oak leaf cluster. He did his civic work serving as a Distinguished Eagle Scout and Grand Master of the Masons for the Asia Pacific Region. He endeavored to reestablish relations between Masonry and the Catholic Church by visiting the Pope in the Vatican. As he toured the country and visited lodges, he encouraged brothers to include prayers in their work.

Quasha co-authored the Revised Minnesota paper form board test, still in use today, assessing mechanical aptitude. Quasha served as Scoutmaster of Troop 1, American School. He joined the Executive Board of the Boy Scouts of the Philippines Manila Council in 1949, and later received the Silver Tamaraw. He received the Silver Buffalo of the Boy Scouts of America in 1974. In a speech introducing President Clinton to the Filipino people, he said, "the Americans have no better friends than the Filipinos". Before his death, he received an honorary doctorate from Lyceum and was recognized for his service to the Filipinos, having facilitated the Fulbright Scholarships by Philippine President Fidel Ramos. Upon his death, his estate was donated to St. Luke's. The Philippine Judicial System remembers him in Republic of the Philippines and/or Solicitor General v. William H. Quasha, August 17, 1972, where the Supreme Court of the Philippines ruled that Americans could not own land in the Philippines beyond July 3, 1974, in effect ruling that Quasha had to give up ownership of his residential lot at Forbes Park, Makati municipality (now Forbes Park, Makati). The "Quasha law," which proved onerous for the American community in the Philippines, however, was later overturned by President Ferdinand Marcos, citing the grandfather rights of Americans who owned property in the Philippines during the time of the commonwealth.

He was a Senior Warden, and Lay Reader of the Episcopal Church who later became the president and chairman of St. Luke's Medical Center.

== Personal life ==
Quasha had four children. On November 5, 1932, Quasha married Arvie Leath Solomon. The couple had at least one son before divorcing in 1946. Quasha later married Isabel Abad Santos Quasha.

On May 12, 1996, Quasha died at St. Luke's Medical Center aged 83.

== Legacy ==
After his death, the St. Luke's College of Medicine was renamed the St. Luke's College of Medicine, William H. Quasha Memorial Foundation.

In 2000, the National Gallery of Australia acquired Australian photographer Max Dupain's (1911–1992) New Guinea portfolio from the Quasha family. The portfolio is made up of 27 prints that were acquired by William Quasha while he was a captain in the US Army in Australia.
