= Parkview Historic District =

Parkview Historic District may refer to:

- Parkview Historic District (New Orleans, Louisiana), listed on the NRHP in Louisiana
- Delmar Loop–Parkview Gardens Historic District, University City, Missouri, listed on the NRHP in Missouri
- Parkview Historic District (St. Louis, Missouri), listed on the NRHP in Missouri
- Parkview Historic District (University City, Missouri), listed on the NRHP in Missouri
- Parkview Historic District (Milton, Wisconsin), listed on the NRHP in Wisconsin
