= Bullitt-Longenecker House =

Historic house in New Orleans

- U.S. National Register of Historic Places
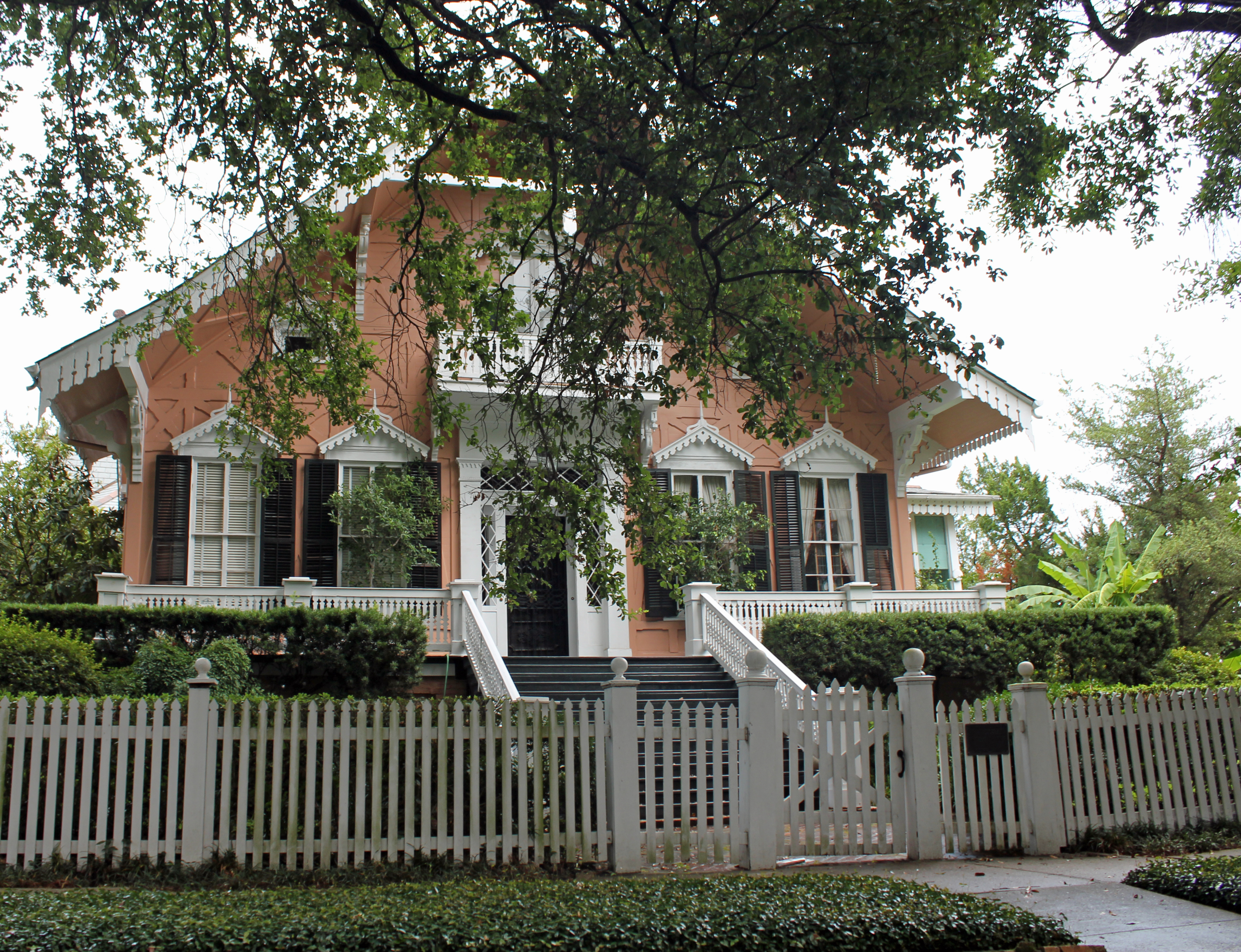

- Location within Louisiana
- Location: 3627 Carondelet St., New Orleans, Louisiana
- Coordinates: 29°55′42″N 90°05′42″W
- Area: 0.1 acres (0.040 ha)
- Built: 1868
- Architectural style: Swiss Chalet
- NRHP reference No.: 81000296
- Added to NRHP: October 1, 1981

The Bullitt-Longenecker House is a historic residence in New Orleans, Orleans Parish in Louisiana. It was built between 1868 and 1869. It was listed on the National Register of Historic Places in 1981.

It is at 3267 Carondelet Street and is an example of Swiss Chalet architecture. It was designed by Edward Gottheil after his trip to the 1867 Paris Exposition as chief commissioner for Louisiana.

After Cuthbert Bullit, a customs inspector appointed by Abraham Lincoln, moved back to Kentucky, the home l was In 1881, the house was sold to Frederick Ford Hansell and became known as “Hansell’s Cottage.” In 1883, Simon Hernsheim purchased it and had it moved to St. Charles Avenue. It was in Jefferson City (now part of the Milan neighborhood), and was moved after being sold to Simon Hernsheim, a tobacco businessman, to make way for a large Italianate mansion.

It has 1 1/2 stories. The home became the Columns Hotel and was partitioned into apartments in the 1920s. It was eventually renovated.

== See also ==
- Carondelet Street
- National Register of Historic Places listings in Orleans Parish, Louisiana
