= Louisiana State Bank Building =

- U.S. National Register of Historic Places
- U.S. National Historic Landmark
- U.S. National Historic Landmark District – Contributing property
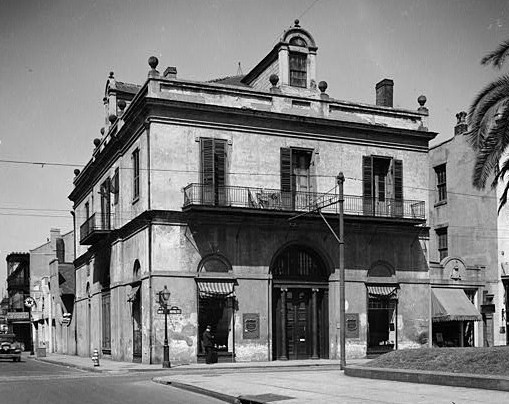
- Louisiana State Bank in 1934

- Location within East New Orleans Location within Louisiana Location within the United States
- Location: 403-409 Royal St., New Orleans, Louisiana
- Coordinates: 29°57′19.75″N 90°4′1.02″W
- Area: less than one acre
- Built: 1820
- Architect: Benjamin H. Latrobe
- Part of: Vieux Carre Historic District (ID66000377)
- NRHP reference No.: 83004387

Significant dates
- Added to NRHP: May 4, 1983
- Designated NHL: May 4, 1983
- Designated NHLDCP: December 21, 1965

Louisiana State Bank Building is a historic commercial building at Royal and Conti Streets in the French Quarter of New Orleans, Louisiana. Built in 1820, it was the last structure designed by nationally prominent architect Benjamin Henry Latrobe, who died from yellow fever in New Orleans before its construction. It has also been known as the Manheim Galleries building, from a long-time tenant. More recently, it has housed "Latrobe's", an event venue. It was declared a National Historic Landmark in 1983.

== Description and history ==
The Louisiana State Bank Building is located west of Jackson Square, at the northern corner of Royal and Conti Streets. It is a two-story building, with stuccoed brick walls rising to a parapet that surrounds a low-pitch hipped roof. The first floor, higher than the second, has rounded blinds above the openings that house the windows and doors. The main entrance is recessed, and there are wrought iron balconies on both street-facing facades.

The Louisiana State Bank was founded in 1818, and was the first bank established in the new state of Louisiana following its admission to the Union. A competition was held for the design of its first building, whose results are not known. The commission was eventually awarded by Benjamin Henry Latrobe, then already a successful architect with documented portfolio of civic buildings including the Baltimore Basilica. Latrobe died in New Orleans in 1820. The building was completed in 1822 at a cost of $55,000. It has served a variety of commercial purposes over the years, including as the Manheim Gallery, an antique gallery, for much of the 20th century. During the building's operation under Manheim, a roof was constructed between the main building and the service building, covering the exterior courtyard. As of 2014, a wedding and events business called Latrobe's on Royal is operating in the building.

== See also ==
- List of National Historic Landmarks in Louisiana
- National Register of Historic Places listings in Orleans Parish, Louisiana
