= Sophie Gumbel Training School =

Building in New Orleans, Louisiana, United States

Sophie Gumbel Training School is a historic building in New Orleans. It is listed on the National Register of Historic Places. The Jacobean Revival style building was constructed in 1918. It is at 5700 Loyola Avenue. It served as a job training for white girls with intellectual disabilities and later as an orphanage. It is at 1771 Nashville Avenue.

The Louisiana Trust for Historic Preservation describes its architecture as English Collegiate and credits New Orleans architect Moise H. Goldstein with its design. It has been vacant since 2016 when a lightning strike activated its sprinklers causing damage.

It housed Spanish flu patients. The city took it over in 1943 and operated it as a home for abandoned and neglected children and later was reopened for use as a home for "mentally ill" children. It was deeded for use by whites only.

== See also ==
- National Register of Historic Places listings in Orleans Parish, Louisiana
