= Canal Ford =

- U.S. National Register of Historic Places
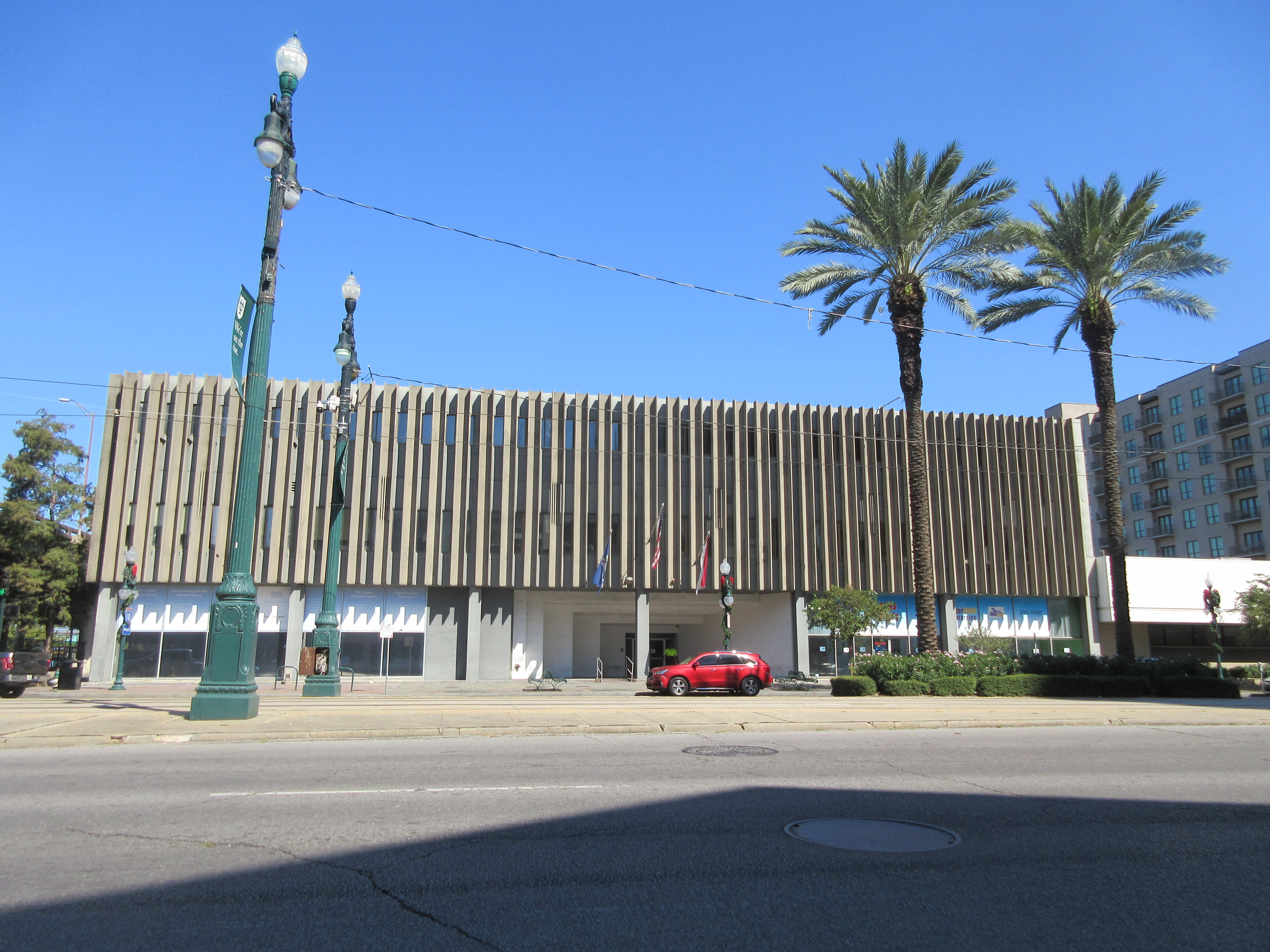
- Location: 1661 Canal St., New Orleans, Louisiana
- Area: 1.15 acres (0.47 ha)
- Architect: Curtis and Davis Architects and Engineers
- Architectural style: Brutalist architecture
- MPS: Non-Residential Mid-Century Modern Architecture in New Orleans MPS
- NRHP reference No.: 100009789
- Added to NRHP: January 24, 2024

Canal Ford is a historic Ford dealership building in New Orleans, Orleans Parish in Louisiana. It was added to the National Register of Historic Places in 2024.

A 3-story Ford dealership, the former Ford showroom and service center is adorned with vertical concrete fins. The building currently contains office space.

== See also ==
- Curtis and Davis Architects and Engineers
- Brutalist architecture
- National Register of Historic Places listings in Orleans Parish, Louisiana
