= Oil and Gas Building =

Building in New Orleans, Louisiana, U.S.

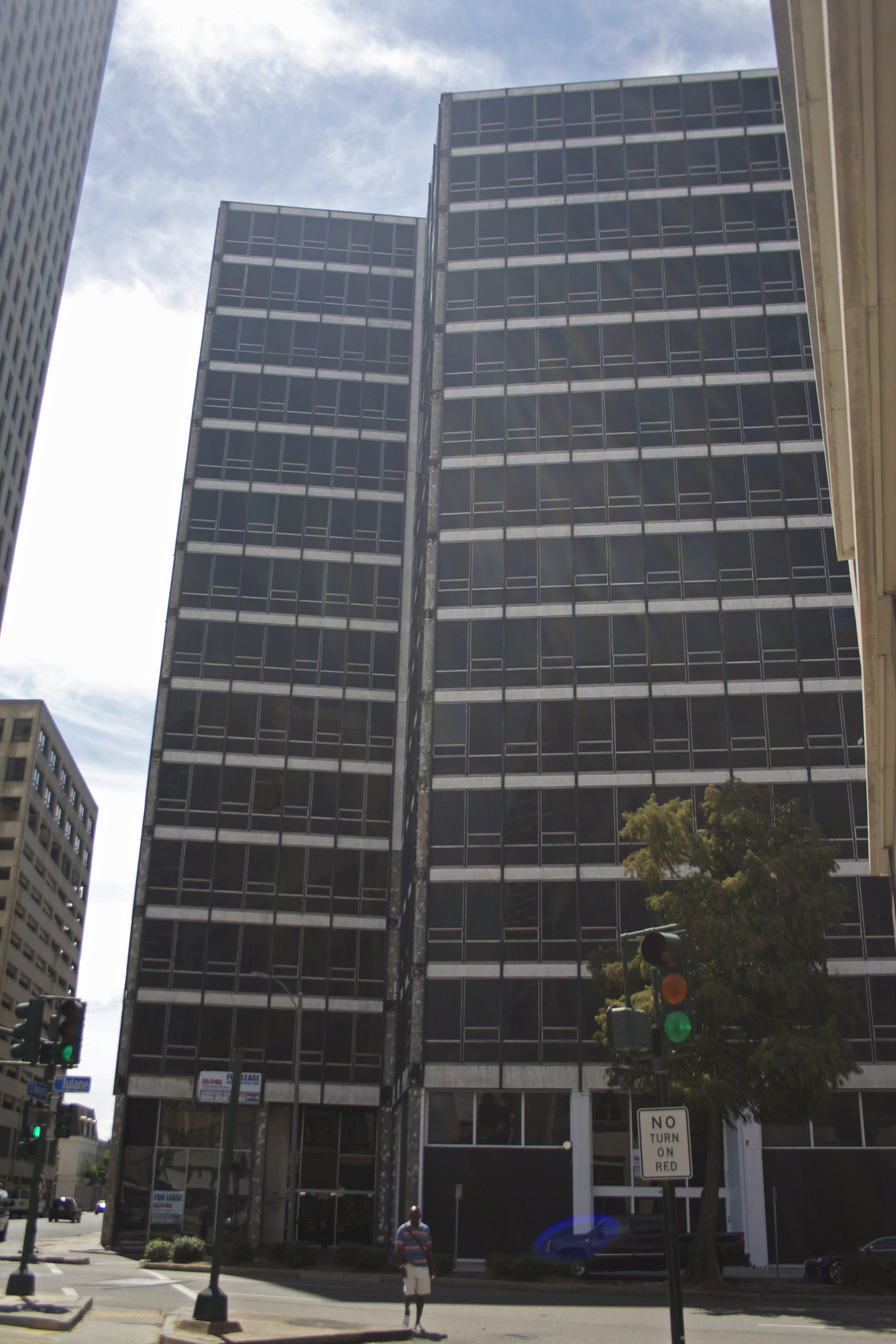
- The building's exterior in 2014
- Interactive map of the Oil and Gas Building area
- Alternative names: Oil & Gas Building

General information
- Classification: National Register of Historic Places
- Location: New Orleans, United States
- Coordinates: 29.954010042554753°N 90.07416659999771°W
- Opened: 1959

Technical details
- Floor count: 14

The Oil and Gas Building, or Oil & Gas Building, is a 14-story building, completed in 1959, at 1100 Tulane Avenue in the Central Business District of New Orleans, Louisiana, in the United States. Its original architects were August Perez / Edward B. Silverstein. It is now listed on the National Register of Historic Places. It was mostly vacant by 2003 and largely abandoned until purchased by a Maryland-based company in 2013 for a reported $7 million. A mixed-use residential property was originally envisioned, with loft apartments catering to employees of the nearby LSU Medical complex. Canopy by Hilton has now developed a hotel/restaurant property in the building which opened on March 28, 2022. Now known as Canopy By Hilton New Orleans Downtown.

== See also ==
- National Register of Historic Places listings in Orleans Parish, Louisiana
