= Simon Hernsheim =

American Businessman

Simon Hernsheim (1839-1898) was a businessman in New Orleans, Louisiana. His family donated $50,000 to the Fisk Free Library in his memory. The Simon Hernsheim House, his mansion at 3811 St. Charles Avenue, is listed on the National Register of Historic Places. It was designed by Thomas Sully. It became the Columns Hotel.

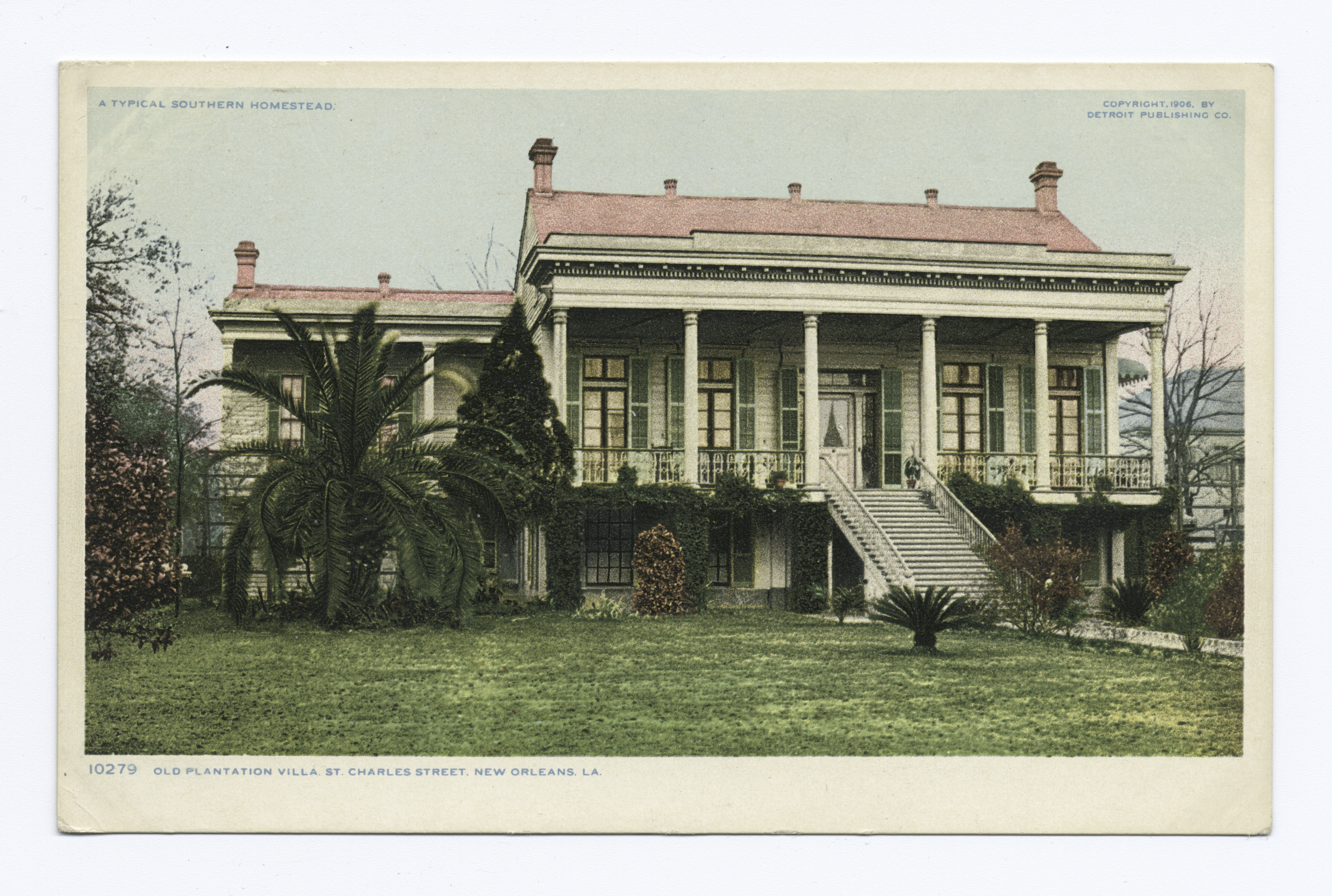
Hernsheim's 1881 home on Pine Street in the Greenville section of New Orleans

The successful tobacco business he ran with his brothers imported and exported tobacco before getting into the rolled cigar business. The La Belle Creole Cigar Factory was built for its popular brand. He built his Italianate mansion in 1884.

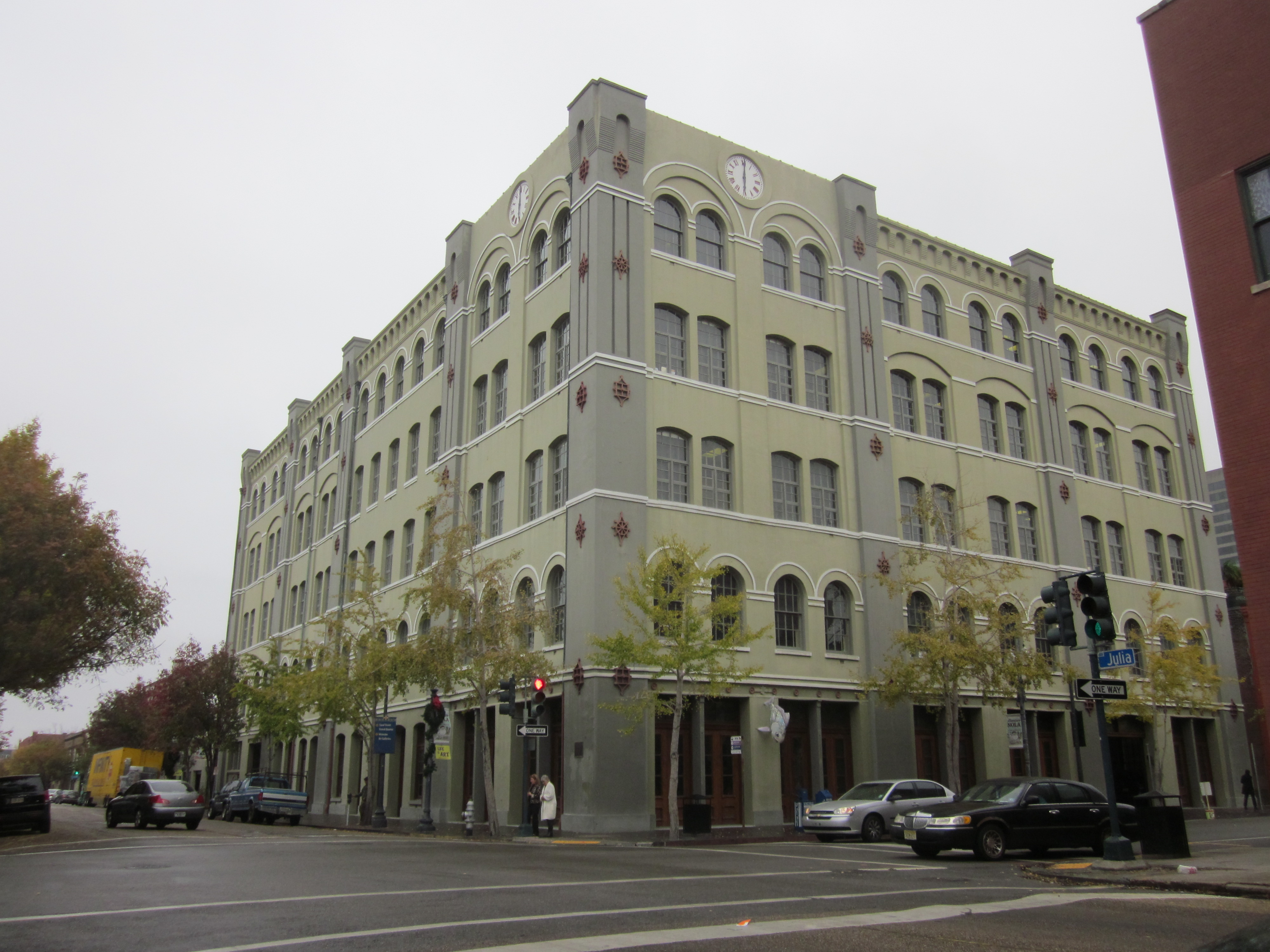
Hernsheim Cigar Factory

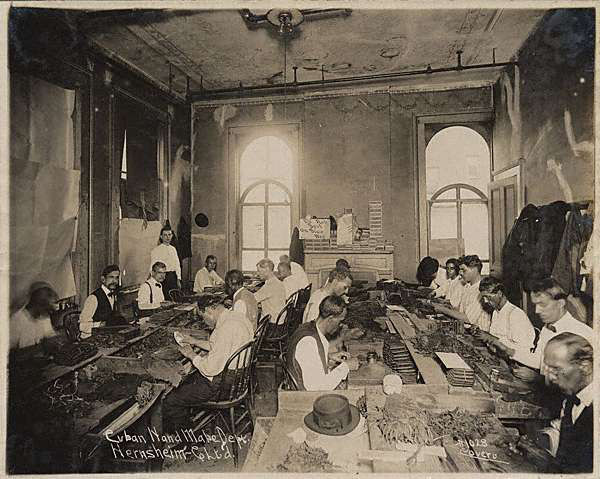
1917 photograph of cigar rollers at the Hernsheim factory

After he disappeared, a search of the factory found him with a bottle of poison and letters he wrote to family. His wife and sister had died a few years earlier and he was suffering from acute melancholy. The factory building was renovated and is now a law office.

== See also ==
- National Register of Historic Places listings in Orleans Parish, Louisiana
