= Blue Plate Building =

- U.S. National Register of Historic Places
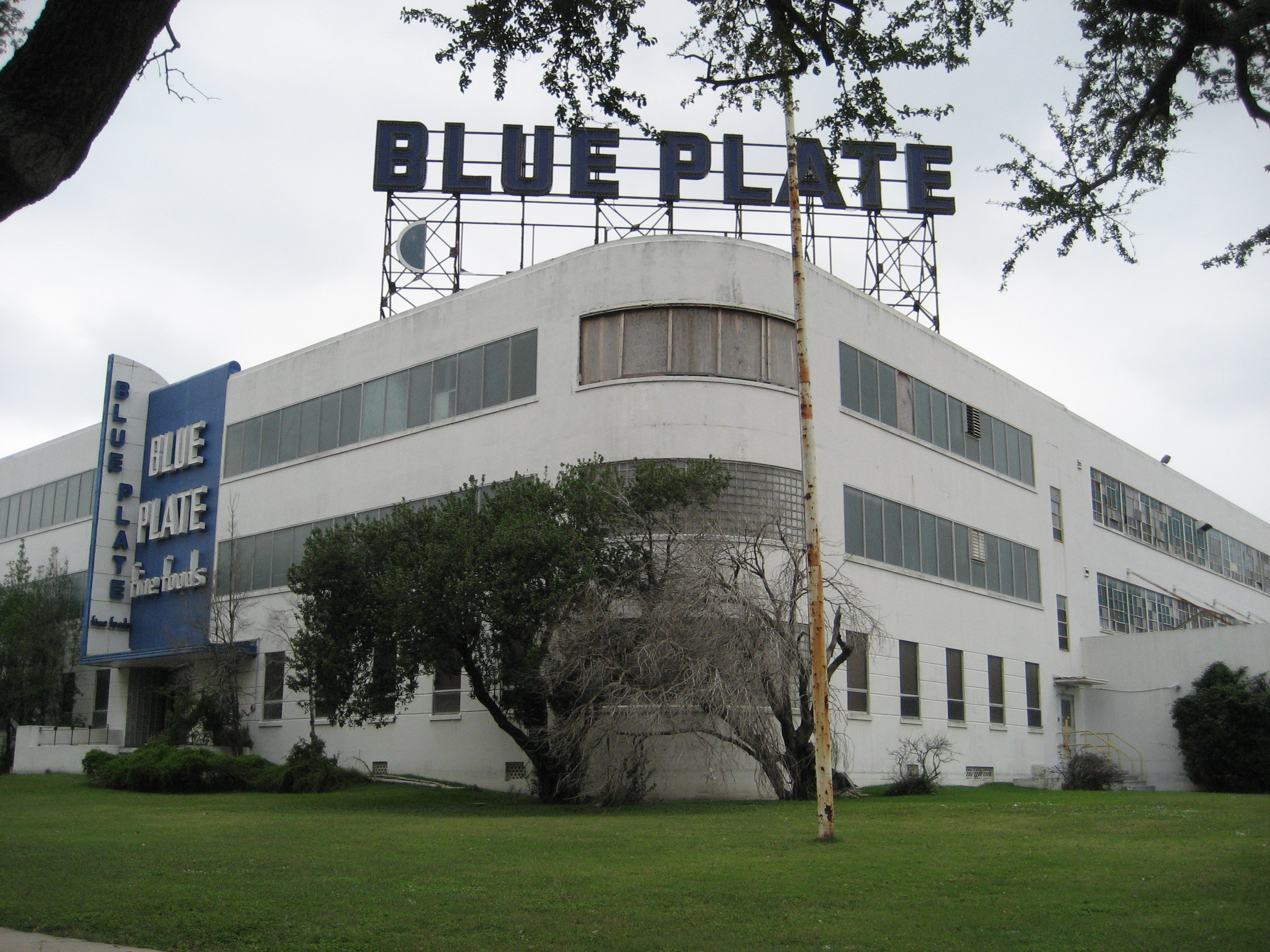

- Location within East New Orleans Location within Louisiana Location within the United States
- Location: 1315 S. Jefferson Davis Parkway, New Orleans, Louisiana
- Coordinates: 29.9575°N 90.1057°W
- Built: 1941
- Architect: August Perez, Jr.
- Architectural style: Streamline Moderne
- NRHP reference No.: 08000989
- Added to NRHP: October 16, 2008

The Blue Plate Building, is a building in the Gert Town section of New Orleans, Louisiana, at 1315 S. Norman C. Francis Parkway at the corner of Earhart Boulevard. It was listed on the National Register of Historic Places on October 16, 2008. Its NRIS reference number is 08000989.

Erected in 1941 in the Streamline Moderne style, it was originally a mayonnaise factory. It was designed by architect August Perez Jr in the Streamline Moderne style, a close cousin of Art Deco known for its curving forms, long horizontal lines and "streamlined" appearance.

In 2012 it was redeveloped by HRI Properties into 72 loft-style apartments with a designed leasing preference for artists, and was renamed "Blue Plate Artists Lofts."

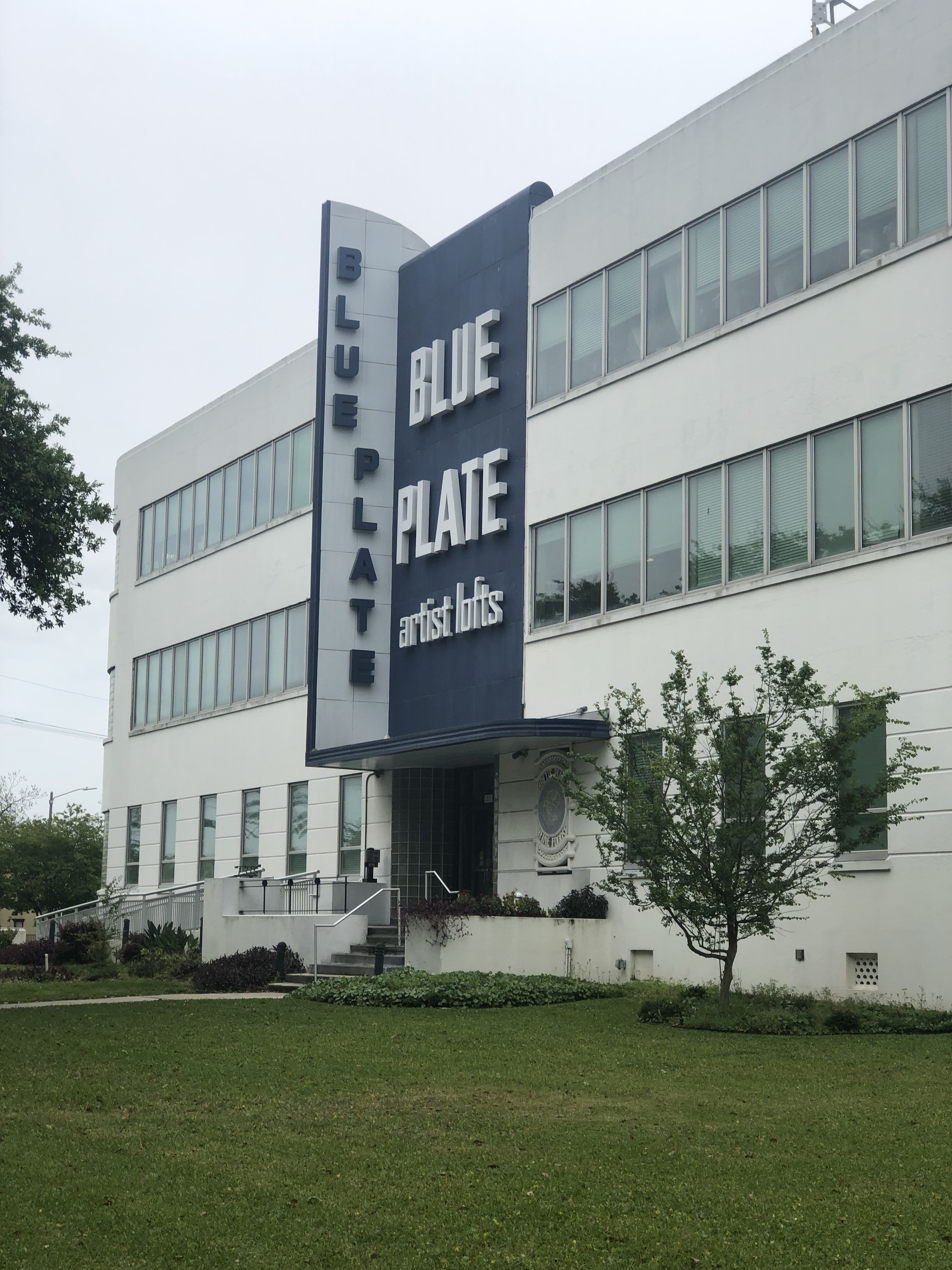
The renovated building as the Blue Plate Artists Lofts, 2019

== See also ==
- National Register of Historic Places listings in Orleans Parish, Louisiana
