= Big Oak-Little Oak Islands =

- U.S. National Register of Historic Places
- Nearest city: New Orleans, Louisiana
- Area: 140 acres (57 ha)
- NRHP reference No.: 71000357
- Added to NRHP: July 14, 1971

Big Oak-Little Oak Islands is located along an old shoreline of Lake Pontchartrain in or near the Bayou Sauvage National Wildlife Refuge within the city limits of New Orleans, Louisiana. It is a pre-Columbian site of the Tchefuncte culture, with earth and shell middens, dating from about 2470–2150 B.P. It was added to the National Register of Historic Places on July 14, 1971.
