= Karnofsky Tailor Shop–House =

- U.S. National Register of Historic Places
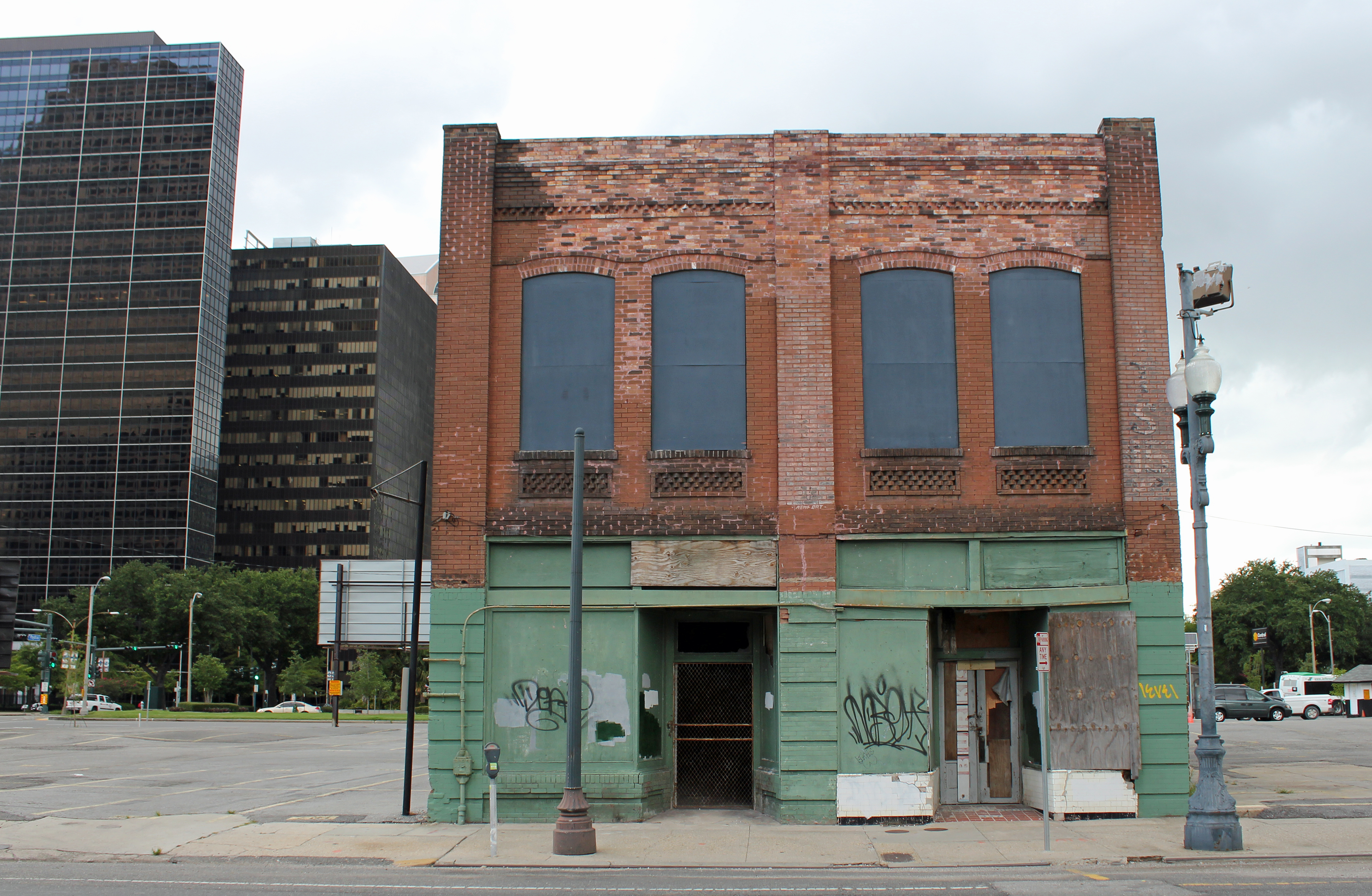
- The Karnofsky Tailor Shop building photographed 2011 before being destroyed by Hurricane Ida in 2021.

- Location within Louisiana Location within the United States
- Location: 427 South Rampart Street, New Orleans, Louisiana 70112
- Coordinates: 29°57′4.27″N 90°4′29.87″W
- Built: c. 1910
- NRHP reference No.: 02001162
- Added to NRHP: October 16, 2002

The Karnofsky Tailor Shop–House (also known as the Karnofsky Shop) was a historic, two-story building in the Central Business District of New Orleans, Louisiana, that played a significant role in the early promotion of jazz when the neighborhood was known as "Back of Town". It was destroyed by Hurricane Ida in 2021.

== History ==
The building was built around 1910. The Karnofsky family lived upstairs and owned a secondhand store and later a tailor shop on the first floor. The Karnofskys took in a young Louis Armstrong, gave him a job, and encouraged him to become a musician. Later, Morris Karnofsky, Armstrong's boyhood friend, opened Morris Music, the city's first jazz record store. Armstrong moved away in 1921 but continued to visit the shop.

Model Tailors moved into the building after the Karnofskys moved out. The building sat abandoned for years, while several plans to restore the building and surrounding neighborhood were unsuccessful. On October 16, 2002, the building was listed on the National Register of Historic Places. As of 2019, it was slated to be restored, possibly for conversion into a nightclub. However, it collapsed on August 29, 2021, when Hurricane Ida swept through the city as a category 4 storm.

The building was reconstructed, using as many of the original bricks as possible but conforming to modern building codes; the new building was completed in 2025.

== See also ==
- National Register of Historic Places listings in Orleans Parish, Louisiana
