= U.S. Army Supply Base New Orleans =

- U.S. National Register of Historic Places
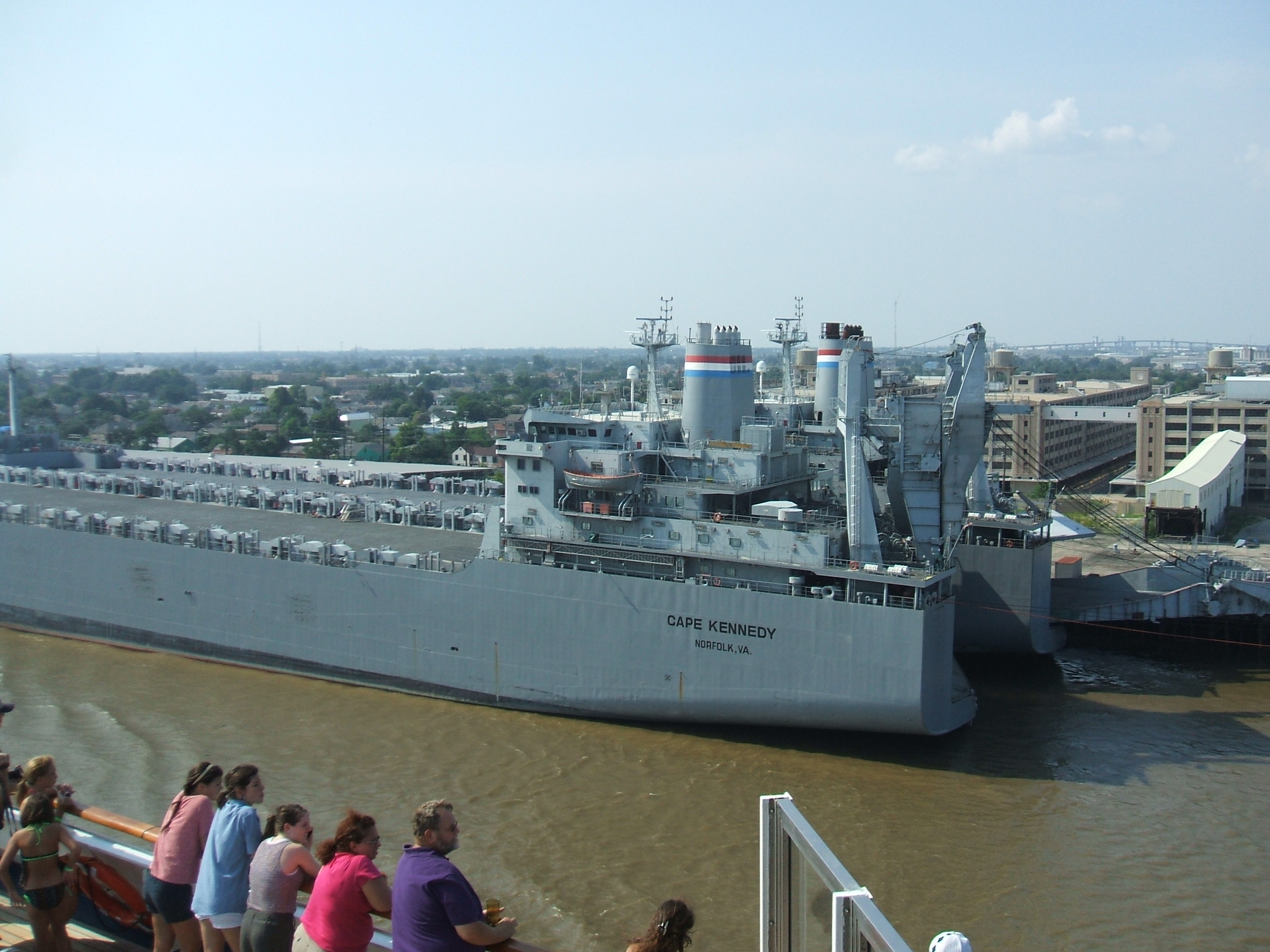
- US Army Supply Base in New Orleans

- Location within East New Orleans Location within Louisiana Location within the United States
- Location: 4400 Dauphine Street; New Orleans, Louisiana
- Coordinates: 29.961432°N 90.031822°W
- Area: 25.33 acres (10.25 ha)
- Built: 1919
- NRHP reference No.: 15001014
- Added to NRHP: February 1, 2016

The US Army Supply Base in New Orleans is a former military supply depot that was established in 1919. It served the United States military installations in the Gulf Coast of the United States through two world wars, and up through 2005 when it was closed and sold to the city of New Orleans.

== Establishment ==
Robert F. Broussard, United States Senator from Louisiana, urged Quartermaster General of the United States Army Henry Granville Sharpe to consider New Orleans as a location for a new supply depot to equip Gulf Coast military regiments that had formed in response to the 1917 outbreak of World War I. Construction was completed in 1919, making it one of thirteen Army supply depots in the United States as of that date. It served military installations in Alabama, Florida, Louisiana, Mississippi, Texas and the Panama Canal Zone.

== Base closing ==
When the 2005 Base Realignment and Closure Commission took effect, military units moved elsewhere, and the base was closed on September 15, 2011, and sold to the City of New Orleans. Concern about the future of the historic structures that were no longer under Federal jurisdiction led to a Programmatic Agreement (PA) as a means of oversight.

== National Register of Historic Places listing ==
It was listed on the NRHP Orleans Parish, Louisiana on February 1, 2016. There are nine contributing resources. Of those, three original warehouses were used as storage for military supplies and munitions from 1918 through 1945. In between wars, the storage space was rented out to commercial entities. The other six contributing resources are the recreation pavilion/service station, switching building, cargo ramp, and three water tanks. The fence, main switchgear and electric substation are non-contributing objects. Additional non-contributing structures include a gazebo, canopy, hazardous waste container, transformer house, and several pedestrian bridges. Non-contributing buildings include a corrugated metal shed, parking access ramp, racquetball facility, gas station, pass and tag building, and several sentry buildings and gates.

== Resources ==
- Carleton, Mary Lane (February 1, 2016), National Register of Historic Places Registration: U.S. Army Supply Base New Orleans / New Orleans Quartermaster Depot, New Orleans Port of Embarkation, F. Edward Hebert Defense Complex, NSA East Bank (PDF), National Park Service, archived from the original (PDF) on February 16, 2017 With 95 photos from 2011, 2012, and 2015.
