= Southern Railway Freight Office (New Orleans, Louisiana) =

Former railway station and commercial building

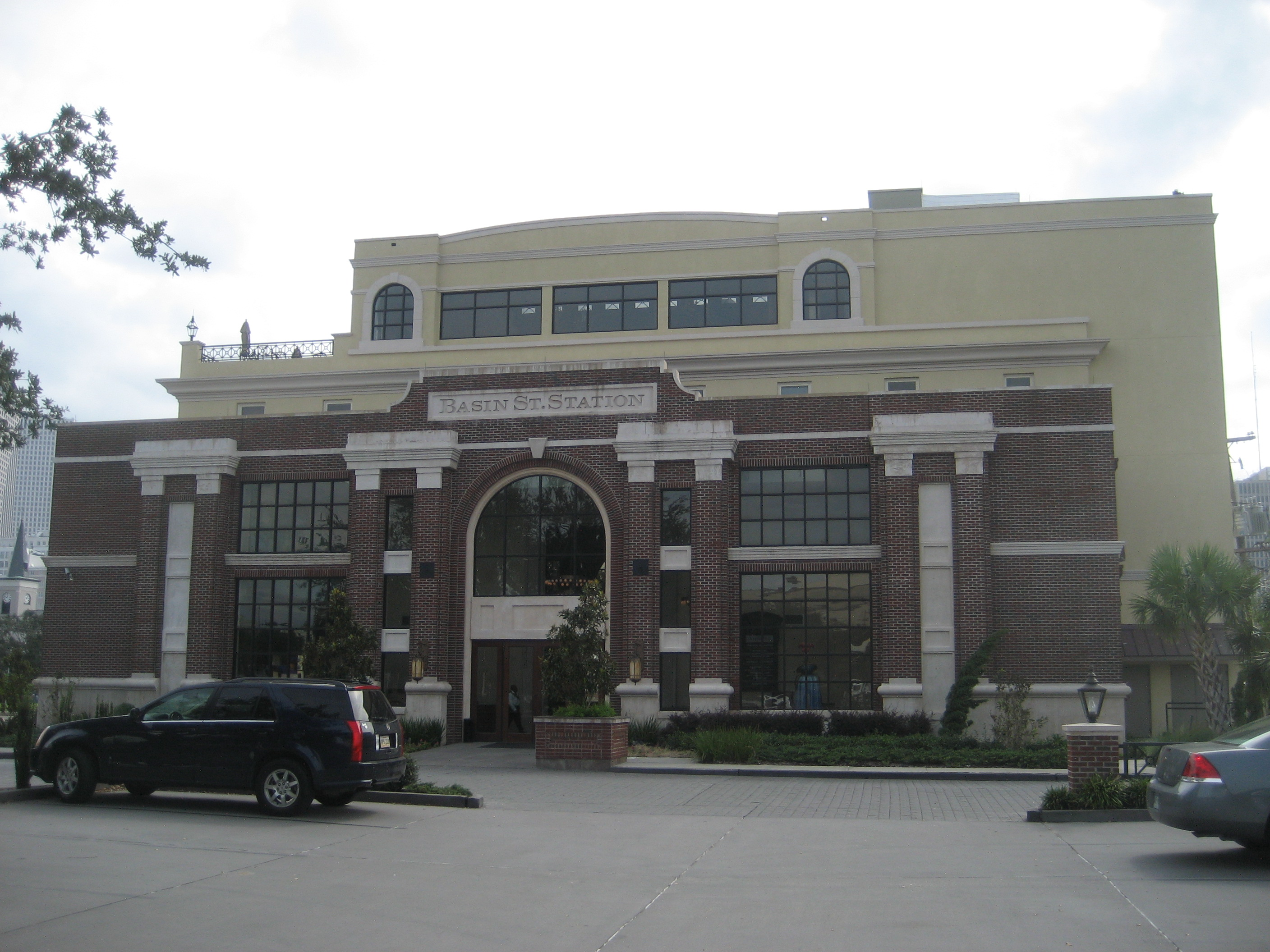
- Basin Street Station

General information
- Location: 1201 St. Louis St. New Orleans, LA
- Coordinates: 29°57′35″N 90°04′15″W
- Operator: Southern Railway

History
- Opened: 1904
- Closed: 1975
Location

The Southern Railway Freight Office now more commonly known as Basin Street Station, in New Orleans, Louisiana, was constructed in 1904 by the Southern Railway at the corner of Basin Street and Saint Louis Street. The site was located just outside the original city in an area that was considered useless swampy land. The station was also used by the New Orleans Terminal Company.

The railroad vacated the building in 1975 and it sat empty for many years. The Valentino Family purchased the building and began renovation in 2004. The front of the building retained station's 1904 classic architecture. The building now houses a visitor center, small museum, event venue, offices for their hotel business as well as several other tenants.
