= Fourth Church of Christ, Scientist (New Orleans) =

Historic church in Louisiana, United States

- U.S. National Register of Historic Places
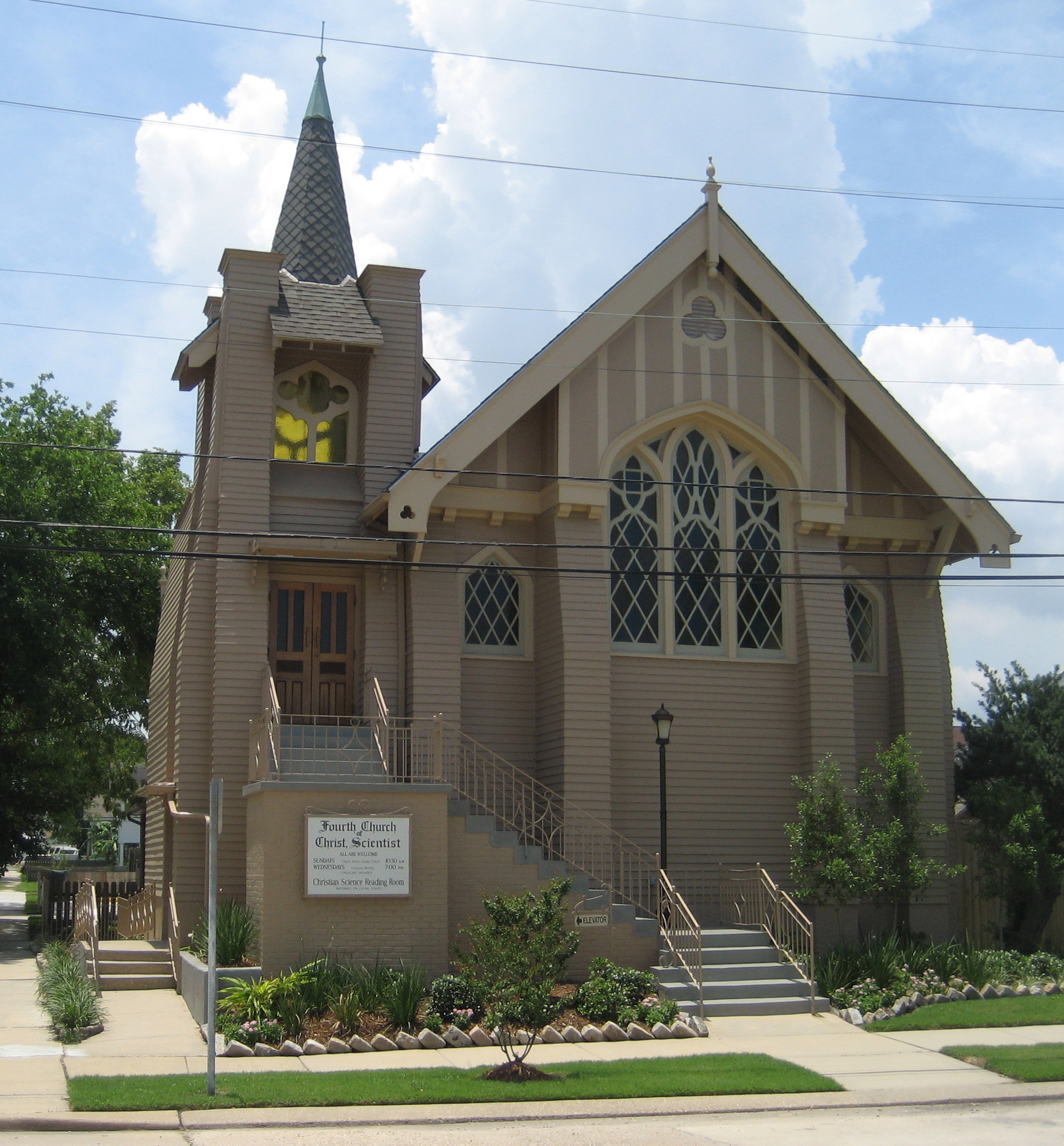
- Front of the church

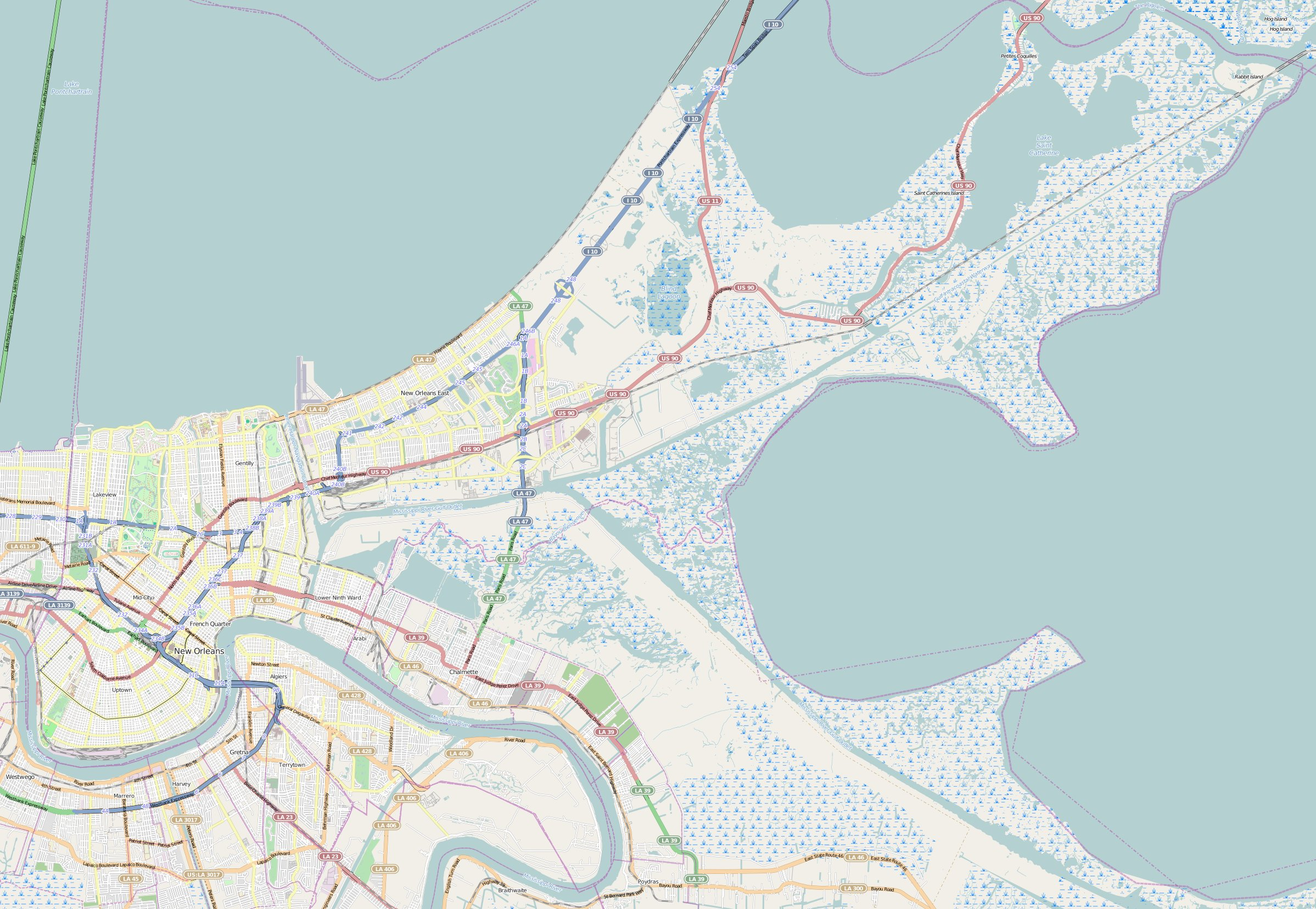
- Location within New Orleans Location within Louisiana Location within the United States
- Location: 134 Polk Ave., New Orleans, Louisiana
- Coordinates: 30°0′5″N 90°6′51″W
- Area: less than one acre
- Built: 1912
- Architectural style: Gothic Revival, Bungalow/Craftsman
- NRHP reference No.: 02000782
- Added to NRHP: July 19, 2002

Fourth Church of Christ, Scientist, located at 134 Polk Avenue in New Orleans, Louisiana, is an historic structure that on July 19, 2002, was added to the National Register of Historic Places. Built in 1912, it was formerly the Lakeview Presbyterian Church. Like the rest of the Lakeview section of New Orleans, it was damaged in the levee failure disaster during Hurricane Katrina in 2005. It has been rebuilt.

== National register listing ==
- Fourth Church of Christ, Scientist (added 2002 - Building - #02000782)
- Originally built as Lakeview Presbyterian Church
- 134 Polk Ave., New Orleans
- Historic Significance: Architecture/Engineering
- Architectural Style: Bungalow/Craftsman, Gothic Revival
- Area of Significance: Architecture
- Period of Significance: 1925-1949
- Owner: Private
- Historic Function: Religion
- Historic Sub-function: Religious Structure
- Current Function: Religion
- Current Sub-function: Religious Structure

== See also ==
- List of Registered Historic Places in Louisiana

Fourth Church of Christ, Scientist
