= Parkview Historic District (New Orleans) =

Historic district in Louisiana, United States

- U.S. National Register of Historic Places
- U.S. Historic district
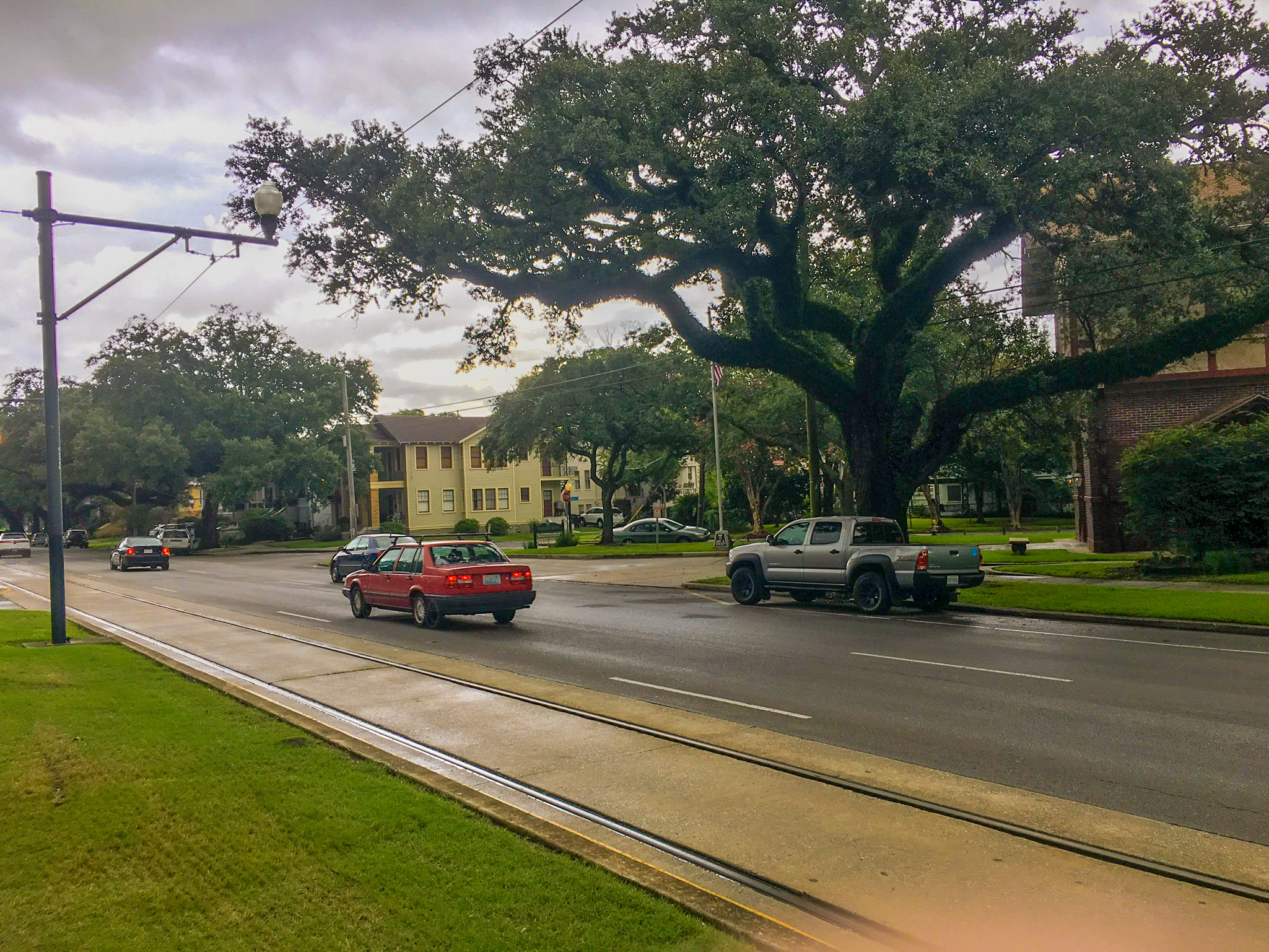
- Parkview Historic District along North Carrollton Ave, August 2018

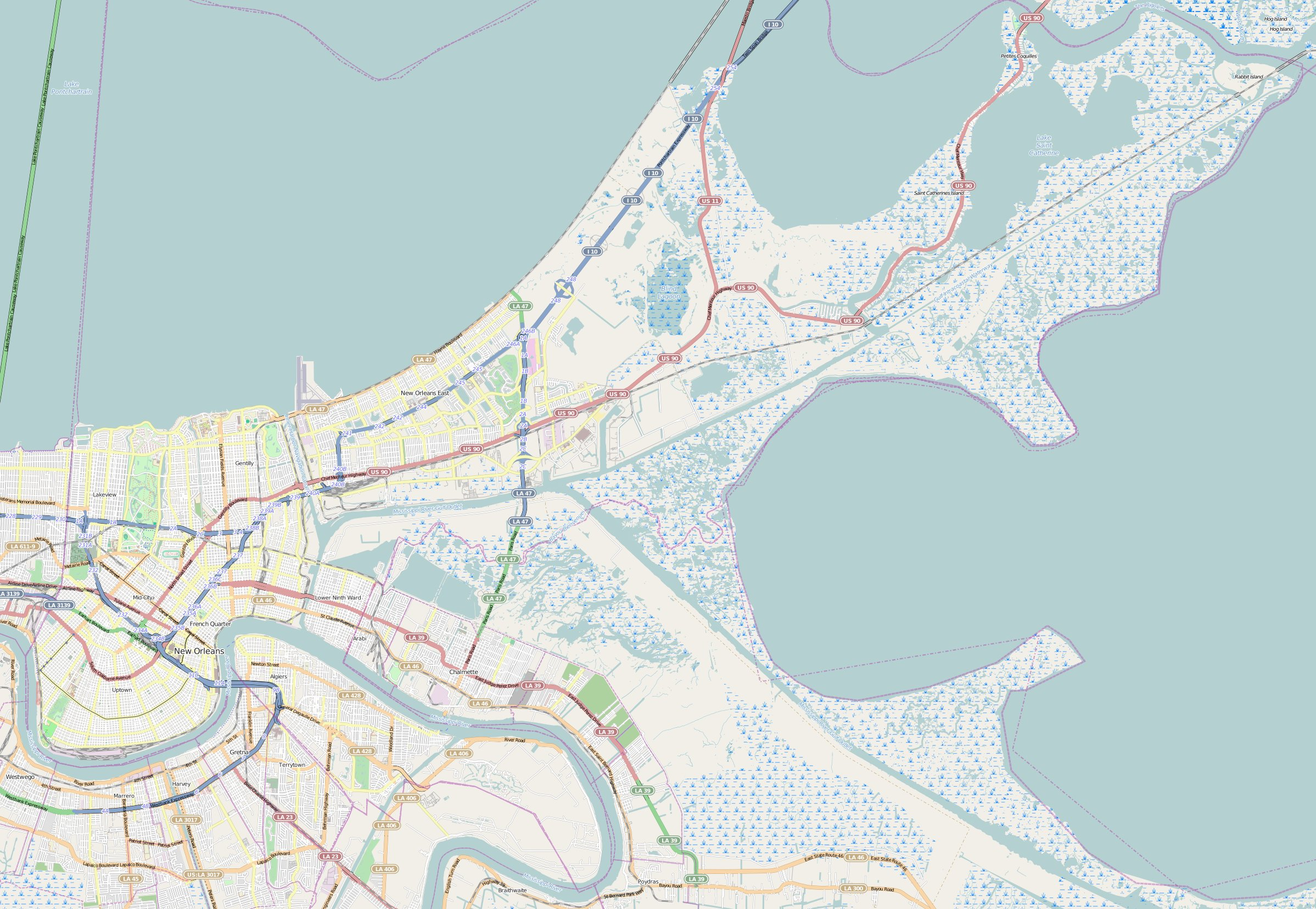
- Location within New Orleans Location within Louisiana Location within the United States
- Location: Roughly bounded by City Park Ave., Bayou St. John, Orleans, Rocheblave, Lafitte and St. Louis, New Orleans, Louisiana
- Coordinates: 29°58′40″N 90°5′33″W
- Area: 263 acres (106 ha)
- Architectural style: Bungalow/Craftsman, Colonial Revival, Italianate
- NRHP reference No.: 95000675
- Added to NRHP: June 9, 1995

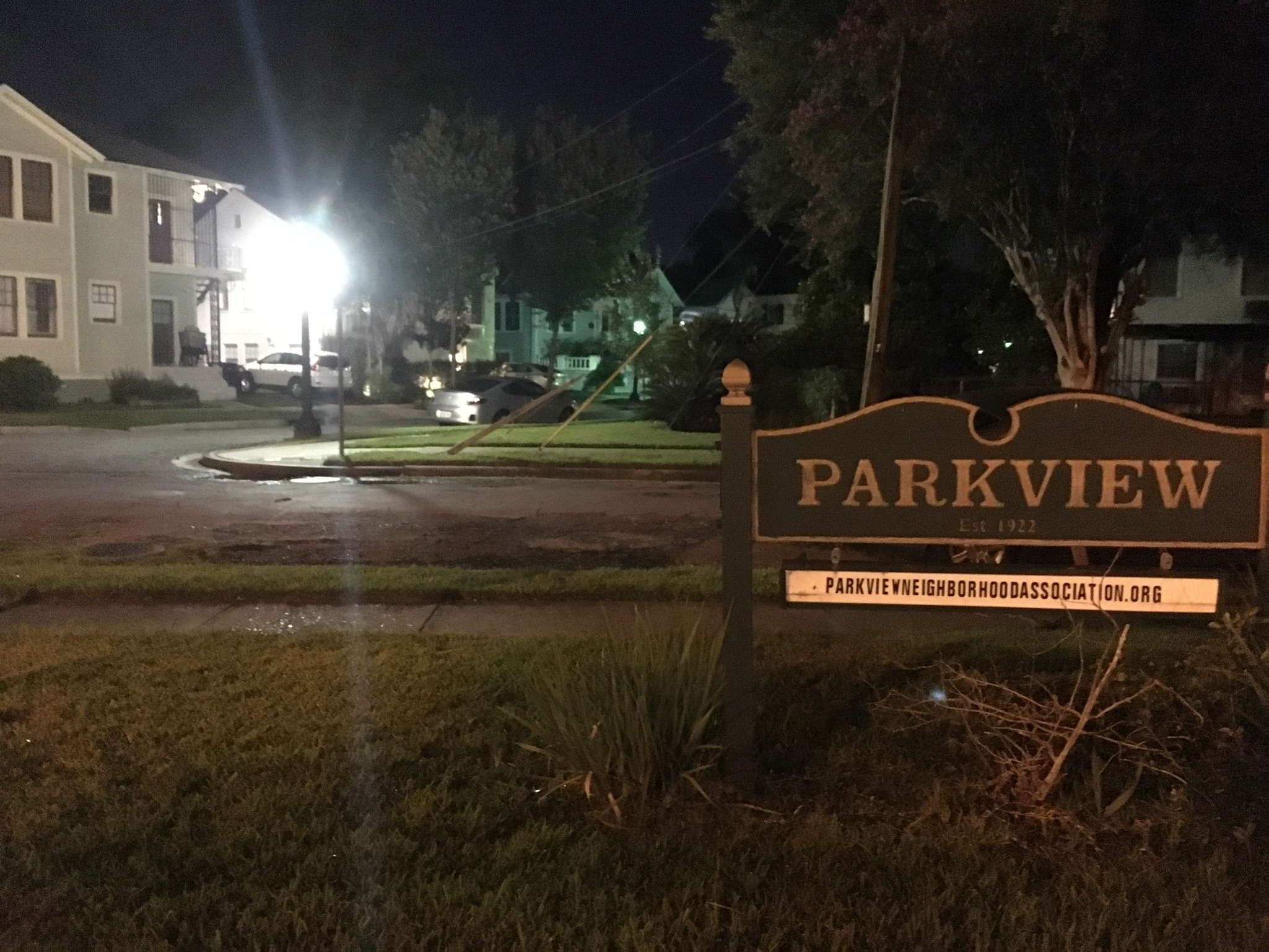
Parkview Historic District along North Carrollton Ave at night, August 2018

The Parkview Historic District in New Orleans, Louisiana is a 263-acre (106 ha) historic district that was listed on the National Register of Historic Places (NRHP) in 1995.

The district included 1,349 buildings, 92 percent of which were deemed to be contributing buildings. It includes the General Laundry Building and the Jean Marie Saux Building which are separately listed on the NRHP.

It consists of:

- Shotgun Houses (520 - 39%) of both single shotgun and double-shotgun architecture
- Bungalow (132 - 10%)
- Raised Basement (218 - 16%)
- Two-story Single Houses (100 - 7%), some with a one- or two-story porch
- Two-Story Double Houses (170 - 13%)
- Commercial (110 - 8%)
- Institutional (7 - 1/2 percent), almost all being school buildings
- Other (92 - 7%).
