= Rampart Street =

Street in New Orleans, U.S.

Coordinates: 29.9683°N 90.0739°W

Rampart Street (French: rue du Rempart) is a historic avenue located in New Orleans, Louisiana.

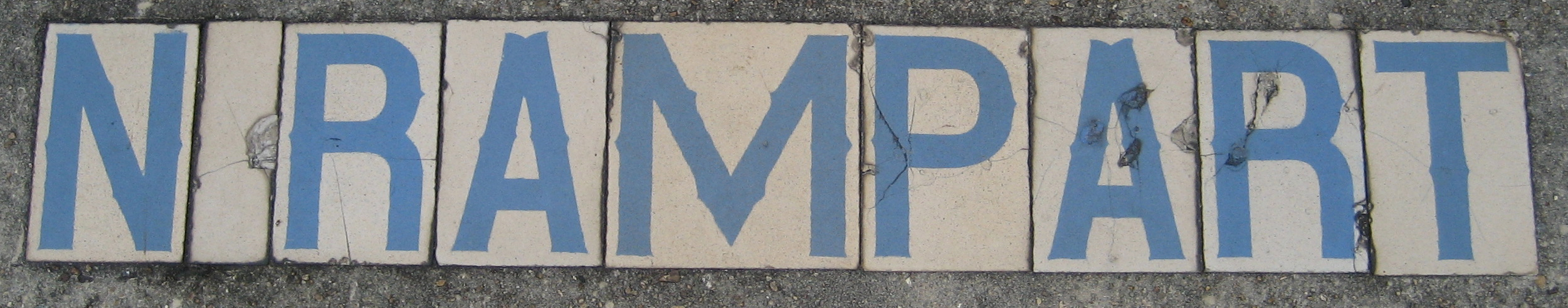
North Rampart Street tiles, Marigny neighborhood

The section of Rampart Street downriver from Canal Street is designated as North Rampart Street, which forms the inland or northern border of the French Quarter (Vieux Carre). Crossing Esplanade Avenue, the street continues into the Faubourg Marigny neighborhood, then splits off from St. Claude Avenue to become a single-lane, one-way street through residential neighborhoods, and continues into the Bywater neighborhood. With a break at the Industrial Canal, Rampart Street resumes in the Lower Ninth Ward.

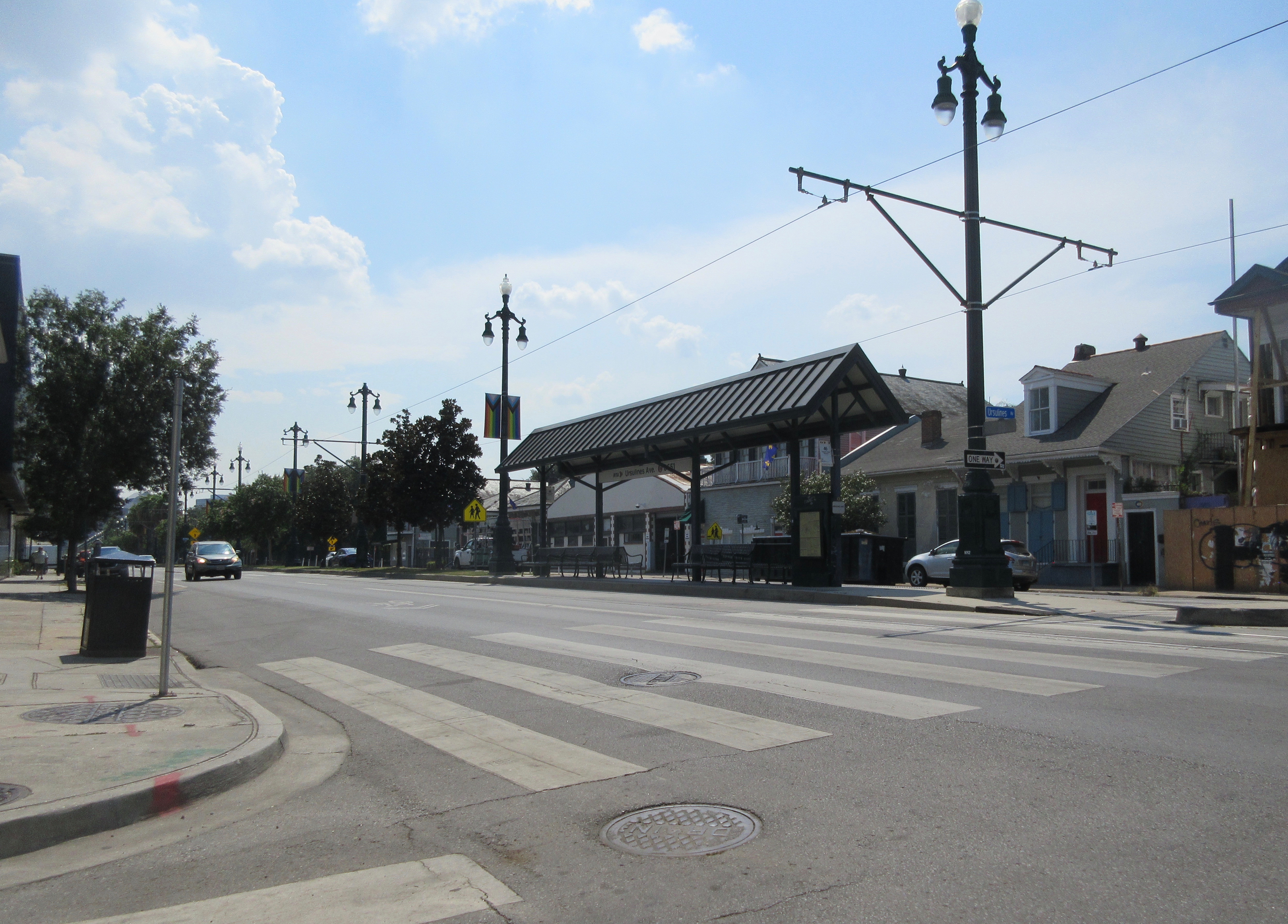
Rampart Street, New Orleans

Upriver from Canal, it is designated as South Rampart Street, and runs through the New Orleans Central Business District and continues to St. Andrew Street. In the 19th century, the "South Rampart Street" designation continued into Uptown New Orleans; this section is now named Danneel Street.

== History ==
The street gets its name from the wall, or "Rampart" (Rempart in French), that was built on the north side of the street in the city's early years to fortify the early French colonial city. Today, the portion of Rampart from Canal Street to St. Claude Avenue has four lanes separated by a tree-lined neutral ground. Like Canal Street, Carondelet Street, and other streets in New Orleans, Rampart features classic lampposts reminiscent of the past.

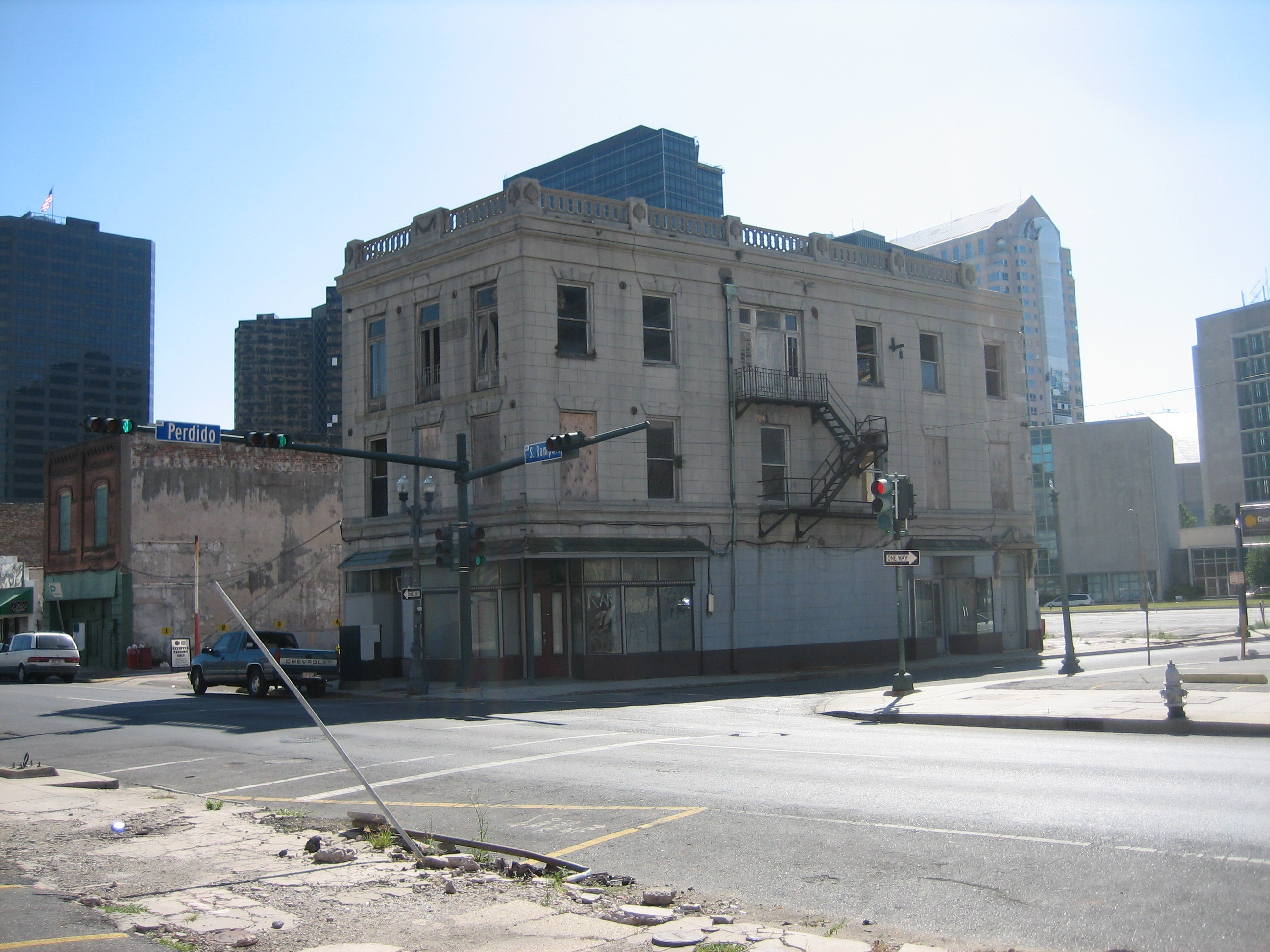
The famous "Eagle" building at South Rampart & Perdido streets is a jazz history landmark

In the early and mid-20th century, South Rampart Street on either side of Canal was the center of an important African-American commercial and entertainment district. The notable Jazz trumpetist Louis Armstrong grew up on South Rampart Street.

Rampart Street's significance has been commemorated in songs like "Saturday Night Fish Fry," "I've Got the Blues for Rampart Street," and "South Rampart Street Parade," a jazz march composed by Ray Bauduc and Bob Haggart in 1937.

In 1926, the St. Claude streetcar line was built, which ran down part of North Rampart. But it was removed in 1949 (as were eventually all but one of the streetcar lines in New Orleans), in favor of more lanes for automobiles. In December 2014, the New Orleans Regional Transit Authority began construction on the 1.6-mile North Rampart-St. Claude streetcar line, which runs down North Rampart from Canal before continuing on St. Claude Street to Elysian Fields Avenue. It was completed October 2016.

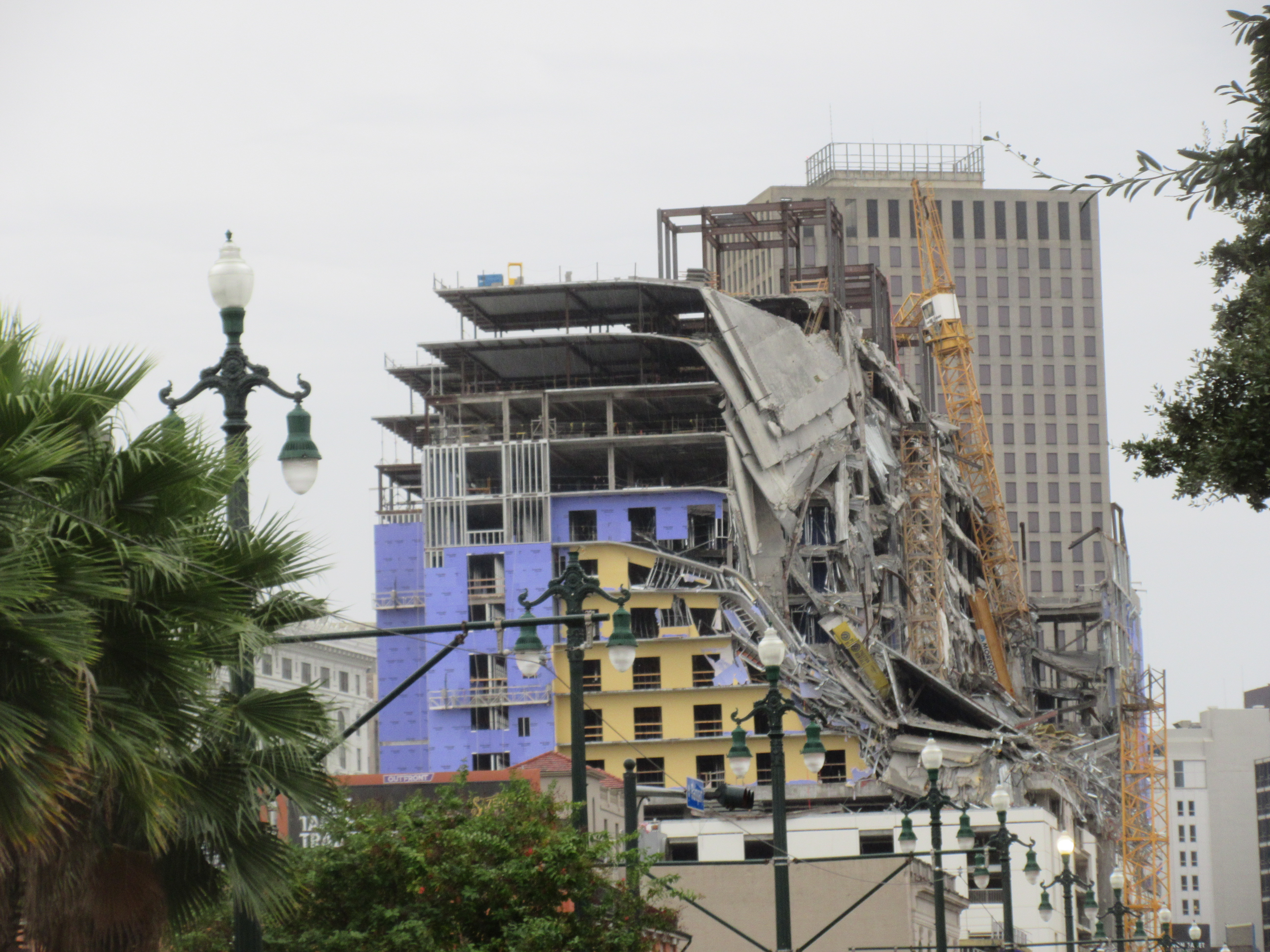
The partially collapsed building seen from Rampart Street, October 2019.

On October 20, 2019, the attempted implosion of one of two damaged tower cranes on the site of the collapsed Hard Rock hotel caused the jib of one of the cranes to fall vertically onto Rampart Street, effectively impaling the street near its intersection with Canal Street. As well, a partial collapse of the structure occurred on the side facing North Rampart Street. Three workers were killed and dozens of others injured. Construction work ceased and the developer was working with the city on the methodology for removing the damaged 18 story building. A specific plan had not yet been finalized as of January 8, 2020.

== Landmarks ==
North Rampart

- Louis Armstrong Park—the site of Congo Square and home of the New Orleans Jazz National Historical Park
- The J&M Recording Studio at the corner of North Rampart and Dumaine, where Cosimo Matassa recorded such musical luminaries as Professor Longhair, Champion Jack Dupree, Big Joe Turner, Fats Domino, and many others. Longhair's anthem "Mardi Gras in New Orleans" and Dupree's version of "Frankie and Johnny" both mention the intersection explicitly.
- The Saenger Theater
- Our Lady of Guadalupe Chapel (The Old Mortuary Chapel)—Built in 1826, the oldest surviving church building in New Orleans.
- The Center of Jesus the Lord (Old Carmelite Convent)—Built in 1895.
- St. Mark's United Methodist Church—Built in 1924.
- The New Orleans Athletic Club, Established 1872, one of the oldest running athletic clubs in the country
- WWL-TV Channel 4's television studios (former 7-UP bottling plant)

South Rampart

- The State Palace Theater (originally Loew's State Theatre)
- The Supreme Council of Louisiana had a Masonic Temple located at 315 South Rampart during the 1940s.
- Eagle Saloon & Odd Fellows Hall, this 19th century lodge building is perhaps the most important surviving building from the early days of jazz, having been the base for the pivotal Eagle Band and where "the father of Jazz" Buddy Bolden, Freddie Keppard, Buddie Petit, Louis Armstrong, and many other early jazz greats played.
- Iroquois Theater, an African-American cinema and Vaudeville house managed by Clarence Williams in the early 20th century on South Rampart.

Former landmarks:

- Karnofsky Tailor Shop–House

== See also ==
- List of streets of New Orleans
