= Faubourg Lafayette =

Part of the 10th Ward of New Orleans

- Neighborhood
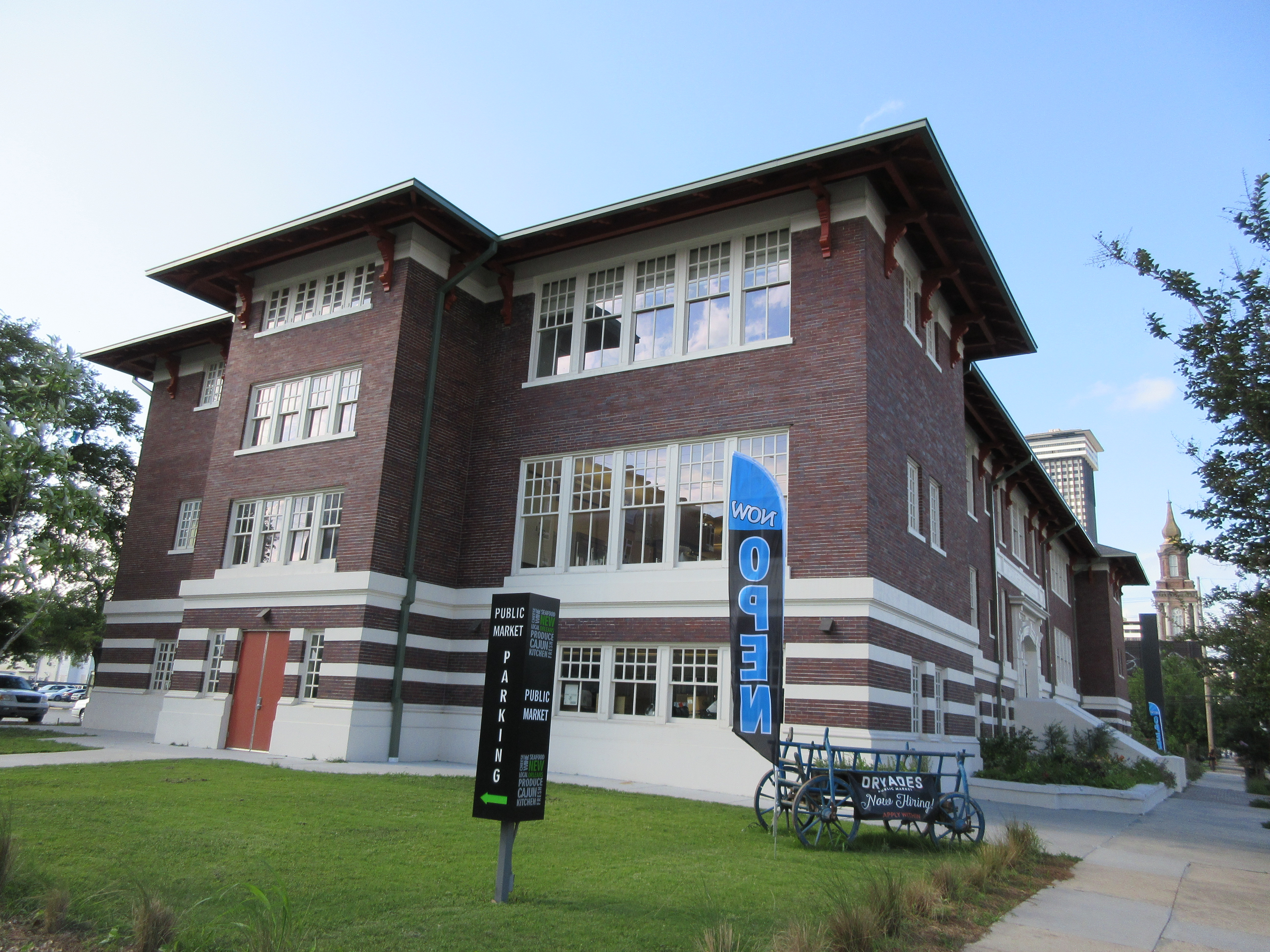
- The Myrtle Banks Building on O.C. Haley Blvd in 2016 when it housed Dryades Public Market
- Interactive map of Faubourg Lafayette
- Coordinates: 29°56′31″N 90°04′41″W
- Ward: 10th Ward of New Orleans
- District: Central City, New Orleans

Area
  - Total: 0.68 km^{2} (0.264 sq mi)
  - Land: 0.68 km^{2} (0.264 sq mi)
  - Water: 0 km^{2} (0 sq mi)
- Elevation: 0.0–1.2 m (0–4 ft)

Population (2012)
  - Total: 1,352

The neighborhood of Faubourg Lafayette is a division in the city of New Orleans, Louisiana.

The historical Faubourg Lafayette was one of the original faubourgs, or suburban developments, to develop to the southwest of New Orleans. In 1833, Faubourg Lafayette joined with the neighboring Faubourg Livaudais and Faubourg Nuns to form the City of Lafayette, the first parish seat of Jefferson Parish. In the 1840s it additionally absorbed Faubourg Delassize. The City of Lafayette was ultimately annexed into the City of New Orleans in 1852.

The modern area called Faubourg Lafayette is in a different location that is part of Central City. The boundaries are the lake side of St. Charles Avenue from Jackson Avenue to the Pontchartrain Expressway, back to Simon Bolivar Avenue.

== Historical Faubourg Lafayette ==
=== Formation of faubourgs ===
In 1718, the city of New Orleans, Louisiana (New France), was established. The original town was what is now called the French Quarter. New Orleans later expanded into additional neighborhoods, planning new streets and squares. By 1810, development in New Orleans had reached as far west as Felicity Street.

Faubourg is a French word that stands for suburb, which is a smaller area outside of a larger city. Three new faubourgs, or suburban developments, were independently formed to the west of Felicity Street:

- In 1810, a sliver of land from Felicity Street east to present-day St. Andrew Street belonging to the Ursuline nuns became Faubourg des Religieuses or Faubourg Nuns.
- During 1813–1824, the Panis plantation from St. Andrew Street east to Phillip Street became Faubourg Lafayette.
- In 1832, the Livaudais plantation from Phillip Street east to Harmony Street became Faubourg Livaudais.

The Faubourg Lafayette was founded with small settlements around steamboat landings in New Orleans. John Poultney acquired the property from Madame Rousseau on May 2, 1818 (with M. de Armas, Notary, officiating), who had acquired it from heirs of Valery Delaissize. This was a plantation measuring about 10 arpents (8.4 acres; 3.4 ha), near the Mississippi River waterfront. The property was bounded by the lower line of property owned by Jacques François Enoul de Livaudais. This property ran through the squares between Soraparu and First streets at Tchoupitoulas Street. St. Andrew Street bounds the property below. This area is in a neighborhood now called the Irish Channel.

John Poultney caused a plan to be made by Joseph Pilie on March 2, 1824, by which he subdivided his plantation into lots and squares. The subdivision was named the "Faubourg Lafayette," in honor of the Marquis de Lafayette, who visited New Orleans for four days in April 1825 during his triumphal tour of the United States, the country whose independence he had helped to win in his youth.

=== Incorporation ===
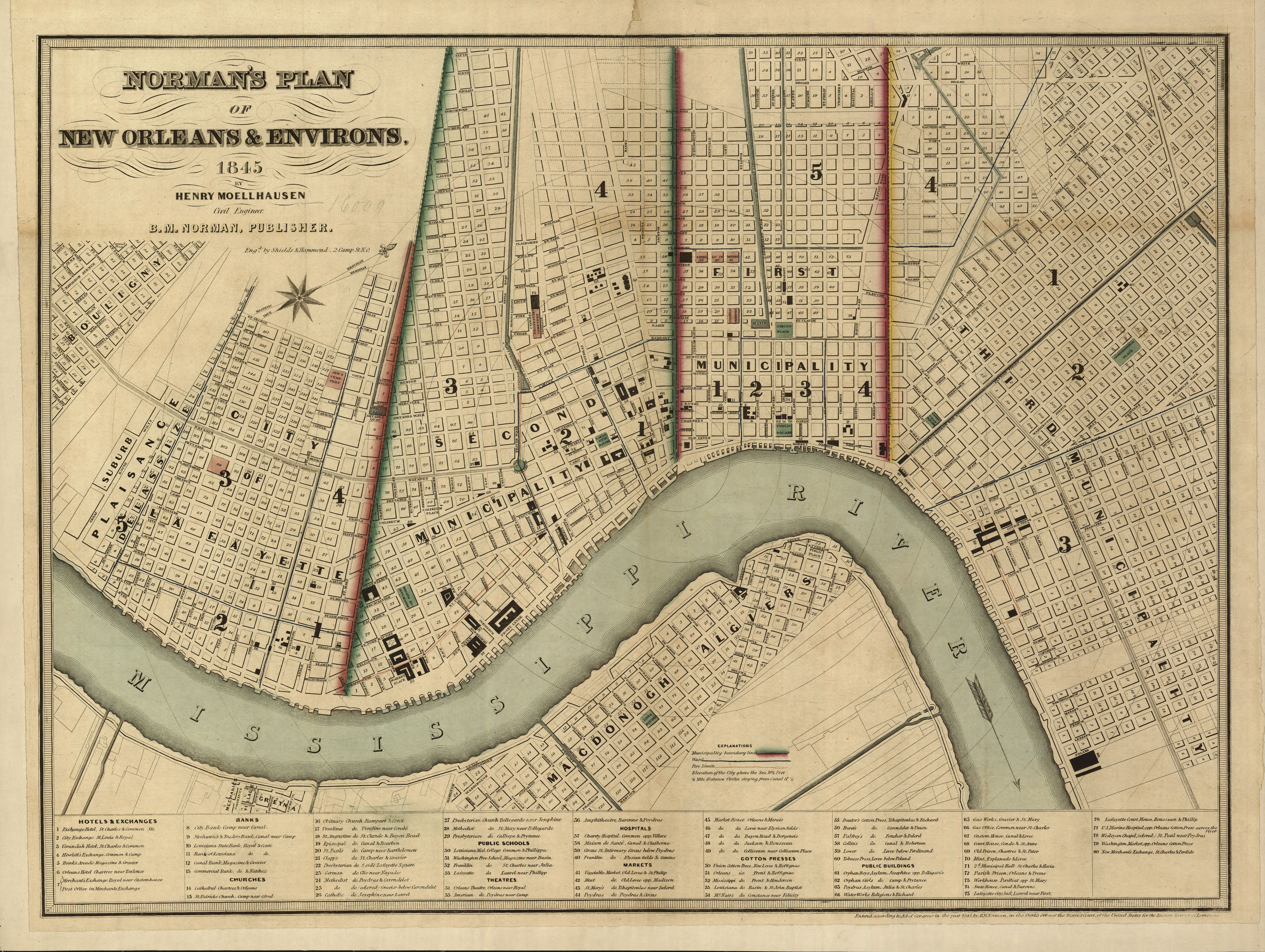
A 1845 map showing the City of Lafayette at left

In 1825, Jefferson Parish was formed, taking the land west of Felicity Street from Orleans Parish. The three Faubourgs joined into the City of Lafayette on April 1, 1833. Lafayette became the first parish seat of Jefferson Parish. In the 1840s, Lafayette annexed Faubourg Delassize, extending its western border to Toledano Street.

The neighborhood's first and only census appearance as a separate city was in 1850, with a total recorded population of 14,190. It was the second largest city in Louisiana and consisted of five wards.

Lafayette was annexed by New Orleans in 1852. It became part of the city's 10th Ward and 11th Ward.

=== Later history ===
The former City of Lafayette corresponds to the modern neighborhoods of the Garden District, the Irish Channel, the southern portion of Central City, and the westernmost portion of Lower Garden District.

It is also the location of America's first experiment with public housing, which started in 1937 when the country was full of optimism with the start of the New Deal. President Roosevelt signed the loan for the construction to commence, of the Magnolia Housing Projects, the first authorized spending under the Housing Act of 1937, also known as the Wagner-Steagall Act.

The most significant development in recent years to the Faubourg Lafayette is the demolition of the St. Thomas Development. This was very important to the city because there were many citizens that lived in this housing development and when it was torn down, after Hurricane Katrina, many residents lost their homes and had to turn to the New Orleans Mission Homeless Shelter. This development housed only white residents until the 1960s due to segregation laws, and after the desegregation of the housing project, it became one of the country's most dangerous housing projects. St. Thomas Projects had become predominately African American by the end of the 1980s and remained that way until it had been torn down. The City of New Orleans was given a grant to demolish the site and rebuild, along with this grant was funding to help over 3,000 families to relocate to different areas during this time period. The idea of this was to create a mixed income neighborhood so the crime rate would decrease. As time progressed, there was rental property built on the property.

== Modern Faubourg Lafayette ==
Due to the fact that the Faubourg Lafayette is not officially recognized by the state of Louisiana, the boundaries of the area are roughly defined. According to the Historic Faubourg Lafayette Association, "No one has drawn the neighborhood map yet." As of 2014, the City of New Orleans website contained no information about the neighborhood but does have a tab ready for information to be input. However, Google Maps gives the borders as Simon Bolivar Avenue to Jackson Avenue and St. Charles Avenue to Calliope Street.

The Elevation in the neighborhood ranged from 0–4 Feet. The area is approximately 0.264 square miles (0.684 square kilometers) and contains 61 city blocks. The Faubourg Lafayette is located in the Central City district.

The Faubourg Lafayette is a neighborhood that is partly residential and partly commercial, with businesses such as Brown's Velvet Dairy. The main street is Oretha Castle Haley Boulevard, which is where most of the neighborhood's businesses are located.

In 1998, the Historic Faubourg Lafayette Association successfully opposed the development of a sprawling suburban-style grocery store in the neighborhood using tactics such as allying with historic preservationists in neighboring wealthier neighborhoods, as well as a competing grocery store, to purchase one of the historic houses slated for demolition.

=== Adjacent neighborhoods ===
- Broadmoor, New Orleans (northwest)
- Milan, New Orleans (west)
- Garden District, New Orleans (southwest)
- Lower Garden District (south)
- Central Business District, New Orleans (east)
- Gert Town, New Orleans (north)

=== Demographics ===
The census tract border 134 for the American community Survey 2012 has slightly larger borders however it is generally the same area. The borders are from Felicity Street to Prytania Street, Thalia Street to Magazine Street, Calliope Street to south Rampart Street, and Thalia Street to Oretha Haley Boulevard. Also, the census for 1990 and 2000 have the same borders but have been split down the middle at Thalia Street. The two sections are defined as census tract 67 and 79. When looking at the data for those time periods we simply added the data for the two tracts together so they could be comparable to the 2012 data.

The census of 2012 average median household income was 29,229.The total population was approximately 1,352 and the percent of the population 65 and older was 11.4%. The percent of the population in the labor force was 76.3%.

The census of 2000 average median household income was 28,551 (price in 2012 dollar appreciation). The total population was approximately 1,490 and the percent of the population 65 and older was 22.35%. The percent of the population in the labor force was 49.35%.

The census of 1990 average median household income was 30,917 (price in 2012 dollar appreciation). The total population was approximately 1,520 and the percent of the population 65 and older was 23.4%. The percent of the population in the labor force was 39.35%.

=== Landmarks ===
Oretha Castle Haley is the main street that runs through the neighborhood of Faubourg Lafayette and holds many of the neighborhood's attractions. St. John the Baptist Catholic Church sits on Oretha Castle Haley Blvd.

There is also a community center situated on Clio St., which is very close to the church. This community center is used as an after school care for many young children and as a recreational center that stimulates children and young adults so that they do not get into any trouble in the neighborhood. Also, inside this community center is a head start program for small children while their parents are at work, or on tour in the city.

In addition, Brown's Velvet Dairy is where the dairy is made for much of the city. It is also a tourist attraction for the city .

Also in this area is a cultural arts center known as the Ashe' Cultural Arts Center. In this center, many plays and cultural events happen in this center. In this cultural center, there are ways that the facilities may be rented by outside proprietors, such as schools, churches, and other community centers. The calendar of the events for this community center is posted on the website for the cultural arts center. There is also a summer program at the Ashe’ Cultural Arts Center in Faubourg Lafayette for children ages 6–16. The program's mission is to promote the cultural arts through teaching the children yoga, visual arts, dance, martial arts, stepping, and voice. They also provide the children with breakfast, lunch, and a snack daily. The prices for this tuition are posted on the cultural center website.

Other landmarks in the area are various cafes and restaurants. One specific café in the area is Cafe Reconcile. This nonprofit café provides training and lifelong skills to youth that are “at-risk.” They have set up a program for these youth and since the time that they opened; more than 1,000 youth have successfully completed the program. Many could argue that this is a culinary school for these at risk youth because many of the youth that have completed this course and went into the culinary business in New Orleans. It is located in Oretha Castle Haley Blvd.

There is also a homeless shelter located in the neighborhood. It is called The New Orleans Mission Homeless Shelter, located on Baronne St. It is dedicated to serve the homeless people of the Tenth Ward area so that they may have a dry place to stay on any given night and a hot meal on any given day. The shelter also holds many different fundraising opportunities for the shelter and hosts many social events.

Oretha Castle Haley Blvd. also houses the New Orleans Jazz Market. This is a place a place that jazz bands have been able to perform.

Since 2015 the area has housed the Southern Food and Beverage Museum, also known as SoFAB. These museums are on O.C. Haley Blvd. The Southern Food and Beverage Museum will now be moved to the building that was formally the Dryades Market.

=== Education ===
The New Orleans Cooking Experience is located on 1519 Carondelet Street. This institution specializes in culinary training and has excellent reviews despite the complaints about expensive tuition. The Myrtle Rosebella Banks School is located 1307 Oretha Castle Haley Blvd. near Martin Luther King Blvd. This is a public school that is a part of Orleans Parish. Myrtle Rosebella Banks School educates youth beginning at Pre-Kindergarten all the way to sixth grade. Another public school in this area is James M. Singleton Charter School. This school is small in size, but its academic statistics are notable.

The International High School of New Orleans is located 1400 Camp Street. This institution is highly recognized and acknowledged in the Faubourg Lafayette and the state of Louisiana. The International High School of New Orleans is also a Charter School, and has open enrollment for all Louisiana residents entering grades nine through twelfth grade. Due to such outstanding academic statistics, this school's general admission is based on a “first-come, first-served basis to students”.

Located on 1522 Chippewa Street is the St. Michael Special School. This institution is small in capacity, but takes on a task that oversees most larger educational institutions do not. This school “is designed to help students with major learning difficulties that hinder their ability to achieve success in a regular class setting”. This school does this by acknowledging students Catholic beliefs in their curriculum. While implementing vocational and physical training, the educators patiently motivate and push their students academically and socially. Unlike most public institutions, this school has a very wide age range of students ranging from 6-15 for the Elementary Department, 16-21 for the Vocational Training Department, and the Joy Center accepts adults 22 and older to participate in this learning facility.

Not too far from the St. Michael Special School is the Tulane School of Public Health and Tropical Medicine. This college offers several academic programs that “provide a comprehensive, practice-based, global health-focused education at both the undergraduate and graduate level”. In addition, this institution offers degrees in six academic departments and is “accredited by the Council on Education for Public Health”. The post-graduate employment rate at the Tulane School of Public Health and Tropical Medicine is 90% or better. This indicates how successful this school is in preparing their students for life after college.

=== Recent developments ===
Other notable and recent developments include the New Orleans Jazz Museum taking residence on Oretha Castle Haley Blvd, the neighborhood's most notable and main strip. The New Orleans Jazz Market, which is the home of the new Jazz Orchestra, will be moved to the vacant Gator's Department Store spot. This new and improved space will include jazz archives and a “walk of fame.” Also, due to recent updates on the neighborhood website, the citizens are attempting to beautify the area. There is a blight and beautification committee dedicated to doing just that. The blight and beautification volunteers are in charge of making sure that there are no poisonous weeds or other plant life to the neighborhood. In addition, they are in charge of beautifying a specific part of the neighborhood, whether that means to plant trees or pick up garbage off the streets.

There is also a publication of a monthly newsletter telling of the upcoming events for any specific month. This is especially helpful for freshman seminar classes that are looking for a community service project or a community service project in general.

Developments along O.C. Haley include the new arrival of the SoFAB Museum, also known as the Southern Food and Beverage Museum. The museum will be settled in the building that used to be the Dryades Market. This museum will include culinary culture and history. Also, in this museum, there will be The Museum of the American Cocktail detailing the history of certain cocktails throughout American history. In addition, there will be a Gallery of the States. The Gallery of States would include an exhibit outlining cuisine from the other Southern states and The District of Columbia. There will be an adjacent building to the museum holding many galleries, offices, a rooftop garden, and a children's gallery.

== See also ==
- Central City, New Orleans
- Garden District, New Orleans
- Lafayette Square
- List of streets of New Orleans
- Neighborhoods in New Orleans
- Uptown New Orleans#City of Lafayette
