= 12th Ward of New Orleans =

Coordinates: 29°54′36″N 90°03′32″W

Map of ward boundary

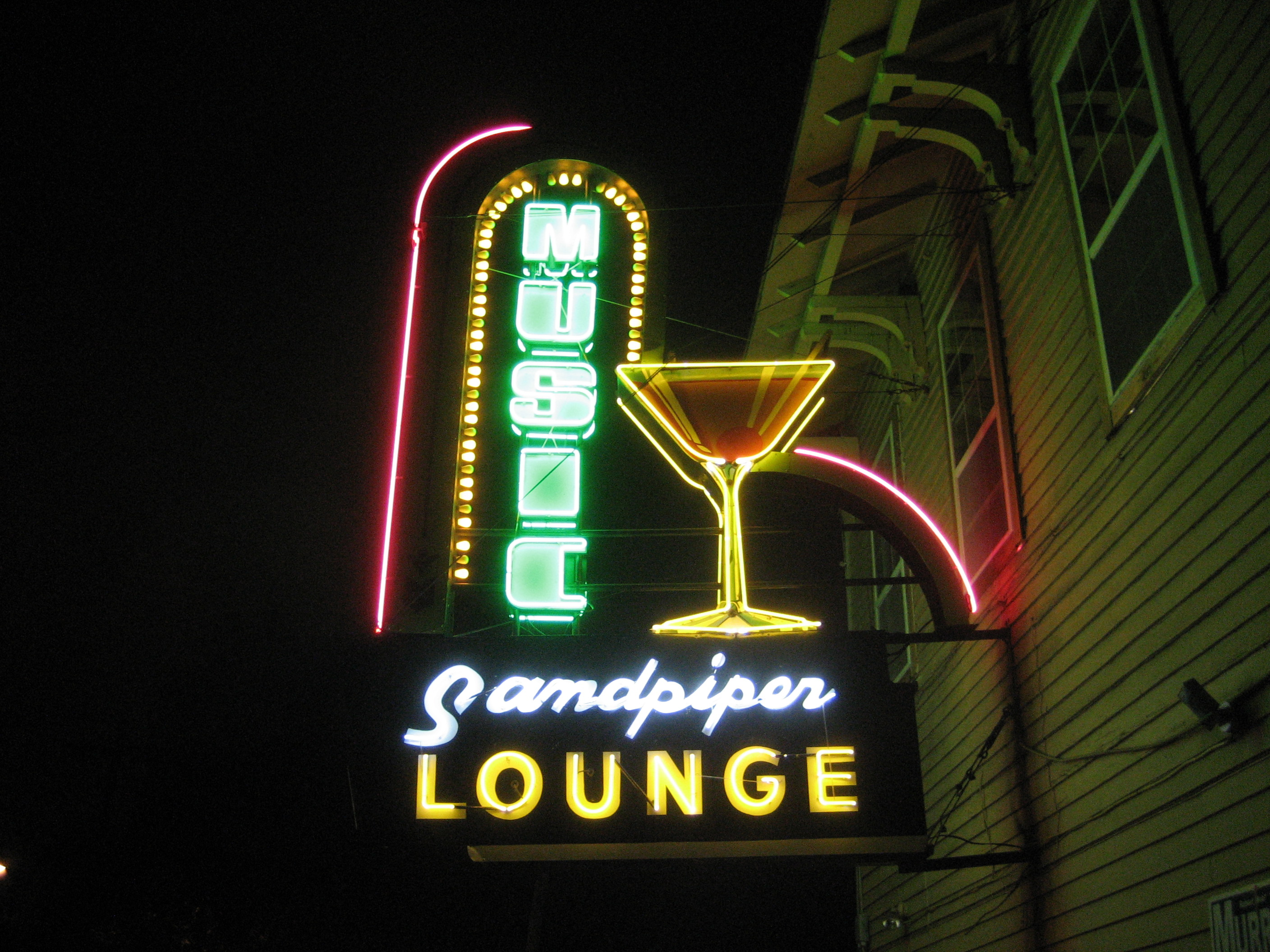
Lounge on Louisiana Avenue

The 12th Ward or Twelfth Ward is a division of the city of New Orleans, Louisiana, one of the 17 wards of New Orleans. The ward was formerly part of the old Jefferson City annexed by New Orleans in 1870.

== Boundaries ==
The roughly wedge-shaped ward stretches back from the Mississippi River. The lower boundary is Toledano Street, across which is the 11th Ward; the upper boundary is Napoleon Avenue, across which is the 13th Ward, and the back boundary is South Broad, across which is a portion of the 14th Ward. It includes a section of Uptown New Orleans, part of the Broadmoor neighborhood, and the neighborhoods of Milan and Touro.

== Landmarks ==
Landmarks include Touro Infirmary, Saint Charles General Hospital. Down from Napoleon Avenue is a series of streets perpendicular to the River named after the victories of Napoleon I. Other streets in this series are named after cities Napoleon dreamed of conquering but never reached (Constantinople) or at which his armies were defeated (Cadiz). Constantinople Street was the home of the fictitious New Orleans character Ignatius J. Reilly in John Kennedy Toole's novel A Confederacy of Dunces. Saint Charles Avenue, with the famous St. Charles Streetcar Line, cuts through the neighborhood, and is the route of many New Orleans Mardi Gras parades. The Columns Hotel, a small hotel converted from a 19th-century mansion, on St. Charles, was used as a location in the film Pretty Baby. The Ward contains two branches of the New Orleans Public Library. The old Carnegie library on Napoleon just back from Magazine is now the city's Children's Resource Center library, and the Rosa Keller Branch at Broad & Napoleon. Portions of the Magnolia Projects along Louisiana Avenue are in the Ward. Other 12th Ward landmarks are Tipitina's music venue on Napoleon at Tchoupitoulas Street and Walter L. Cohen Senior High School on Dryades Street.

== Hurricane Katrina ==
The majority of the Ward back from St. Charles Avenue flooded in the aftermath of Hurricane Katrina in 2005.
