= 10th Ward of New Orleans =

Coordinates: 29.935°N 90.081°W

Map of ward boundary

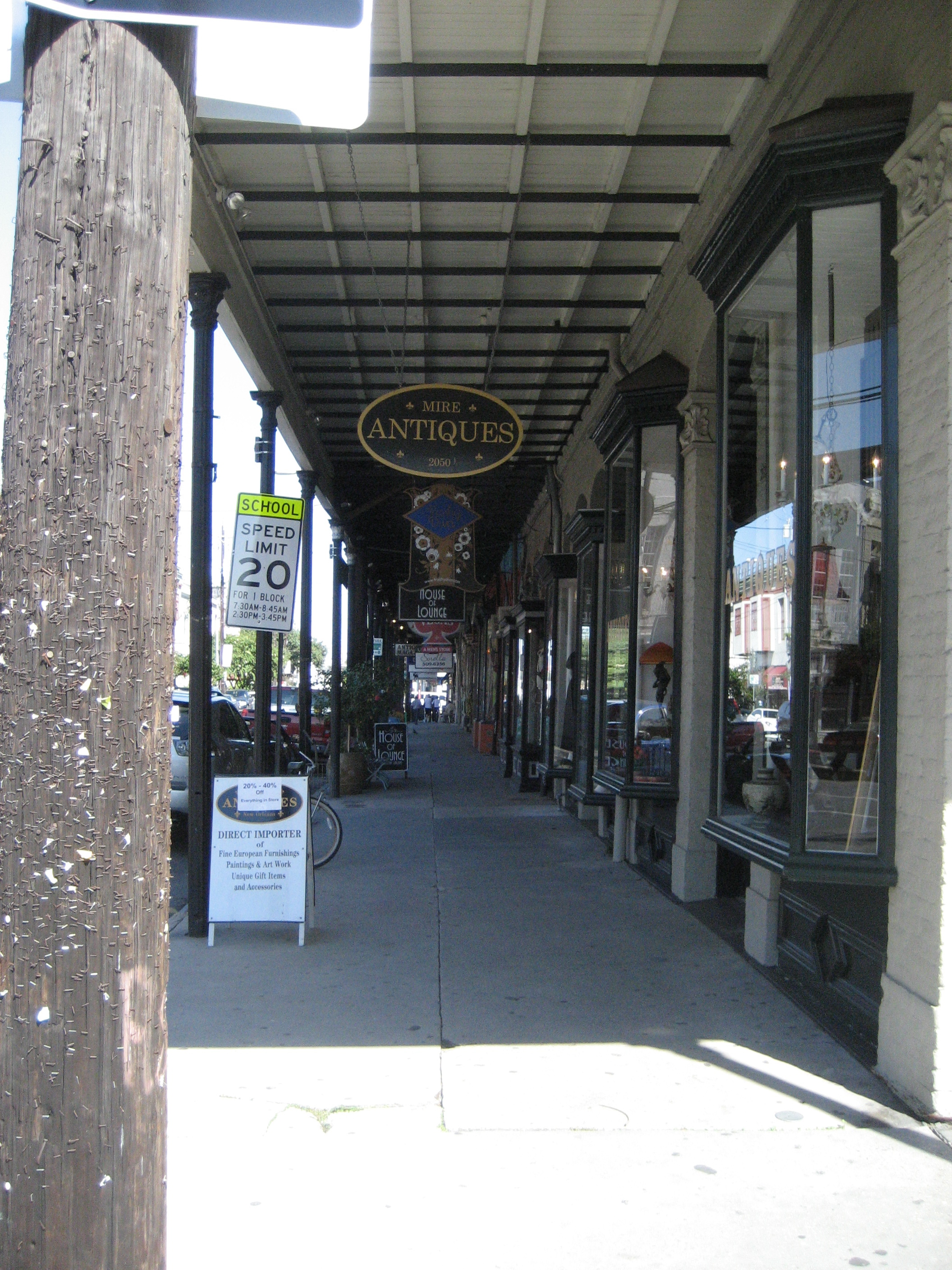
Row of shops along lower Magazine Street in the 10th Ward

The 10th Ward is a division of the city of New Orleans, Louisiana. The 10th Ward is one of the 17 wards of New Orleans. The ward is one of the city's Uptown wards, formerly the old Faubourg Lafayette annexed by New Orleans in the 1850s.

== Boundaries ==
The 10th Ward stretches back from the Mississippi River to St. Charles Avenue, across which is the 3rd Ward. The lower boundary is Calliope Street, across which is the 1st Ward of New Orleans (better known as warehouse district). The upper boundary is Jackson Avenue, across which lies the 11th Ward.

== Cityscape and landmarks ==
Near the river the ward includes part of the Lower Garden District and the former location of America's first experiment with large-scale public housing, started here in 1937, when, as part of the New Deal, President Franklin D. Roosevelt signed the loan to commence construction of the former St. Thomas Housing Project. Further back from the Mississippi River, the Ward includes the Faubourg Lafayette neighborhood, part of Central City; this area includes the Oretha Castle Haley commercial district.

== Residents ==
The 10th Ward has been home to such notables as jazz musicians Buddy Bolden and George Brunies
