= Second Ward =

Second Ward can refer to:

- 2nd Ward of New Orleans, a ward of New Orleans
- 2nd ward, Chicago, an aldermanic ward of Chicago
- Second Ward, Charlotte, a ward of Charlotte, North Carolina
- Second Ward, Houston, a neighborhood of Houston
- Ward 2 of the District of Columbia, a ward of Washington, D.C.
- Ward 2, St. Louis City, an aldermanic ward of St. Louis
- Ward 2, the name of several wards of Zimbabwe
- Orléans West-Innes Ward, Ottawa (also known as Ward 2)
- Ward 2 (Windsor, Ontario)
- Ward 2 Etobicoke Centre, Toronto
