= 4th Ward of New Orleans =

Map of ward boundary

The 4th Ward or Fourth Ward is a division of the city of New Orleans, Louisiana, United States, one of the 17 wards of New Orleans.

== Boundaries ==
The 4th Ward stretches through the city from the Mississippi River to Lake Pontchartrain. From the Mississippi River to Metairie Ridge, the upper boundary is Canal Street, New Orleans, across which is the 3rd Ward, and the lower boundary is St. Louis Street, across which is the 5th Ward. This portion was the original 4th Ward as defined in 1852. In 1880, additional ground (still mostly undeveloped swamp at the time) was added to the ward from City Park Avenue on Metairie Ridge back to the lake. The upper boundary was the New Basin Canal, now Pontchartrain Boulevard, across which is the 17th Ward. The lower boundary is the Orleans Canal, across which is more of the 5th Ward.

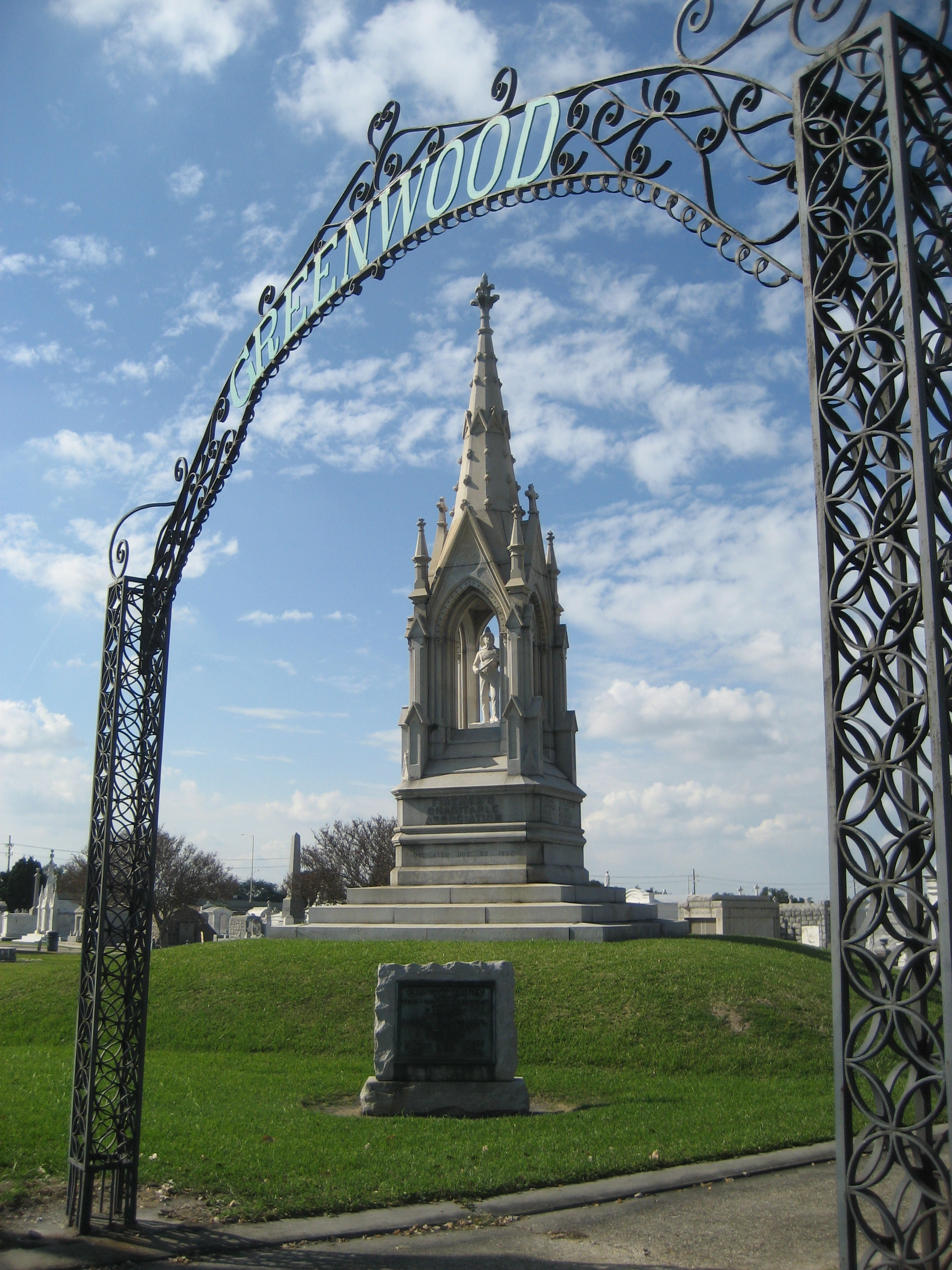
Greenwood Cemetery

== Neighborhoods and landmarks ==
Going roughly from the Mississippi River to Lake Pontchartrain, the ward has a portion of the riverfront Woldenberg Park, and the old Bienville Street Wharf, formerly a commercial wharf and now a dock for pleasure cruises of tourist steamboats. The Aquarium of the Americas is near the foot of Canal Street. The next blocks back include such notable businesses as the New Orleans House of Blues and the Canal Place skyscraper shopping mall/hotel/theater complex. Across Decatur Street, the ward includes a 4 by 6 block section of the old French Quarter, including the old U.S. Customs House and some of the most popular businesses on Royal Street and Bourbon Street, some of the blocks most frequented by out-of-town visitors to the city. Across Rampart, near where one of the city's main railroad stations was in the 19th and early 20th century, is the Saenger Theater, a movie & vaudeville palace where touring Broadway shows and other national acts appeared at in the 21st century. In the late 19th and early 20th century Storyville, is the famous red-light district. In the 1940s most of it was torn down to build the Iberville Projects. Continuing back, Mercy Hospital is near the headwaters of Bayou St. John. The ward includes a narrow strip of Mid-City New Orleans, including some of the neighborhood's best known restaurants. Beyond City Park Avenue (formerly Bayou Metairie Road) the ward widens out from I-10 to City Park, including Delgado Community College and Greenwood Cemetery, and the Navarre neighborhood, including the studios of PBS television station WYES-12. Farther back is the prosperous Lakeview neighborhood with the commercial strip of Harrison Avenue, and across Allen Toussaint Boulevard the Lakeshore neighborhood, and at the northern end is Lakeshore Park along the lakefront.

== Hurricane Katrina ==
Hurricane Katrina heavily impacted much of the ward. Lakeview is only some dozen blocks from the notorious breach in the 17th Street Canal. Narrow strips of land at the two ends of the ward, in the French Quarter by the Riverfront and on some of the higher ground of the Lakeshore, were above the flood waters. Some of the narrow strip of Metairie Ridge took on only minimal water. Most of the rest of the ward flooded significantly, often severely.

== Points of interest ==
- Angelo Brocato's
- Audubon Aquarium
- Delgado Community College
- Fourth Church of Christ, Scientist
- Greenwood Cemetery
- Hilton New Orleans Riverside
- Holt Cemetery
- Lafitte Greenway
- Lindy Boggs Medical Center
- Louisiana Supreme Court
- Mount Carmel Academy
- New Canal Light
- Odd Fellows Rest Cemetery
- One Canal Place
- Orleans Canal
- Our Lady of Guadalupe Church & International Shrine of St. Jude
- "Rags" Scheuermann Field at Kirsch-Rooney Stadium
- Saenger Theatre
- St. James AME Church
- Success Preparatory Academy
- UpStairs Lounge
- Warren Easton Charter High School

== Sources ==
- Campanella, Richard (2017). Cityscapes of New Orleans. LSU Press. ISBN 9780807168332.
