= United Saints Recovery Project =

Non-profit organization

United Saints Recovery Project is a 501(c)(3) non-profit located in the Central City neighbourhood of New Orleans which developed in the wake of Hurricane Katrina. It is a second-tier disaster response and community development organisation that exclusively harnesses the power of national and international volunteers to rebuild and preserve the city of New Orleans. The United Saints organisation was founded by Daryl Kiesow in 2007 after HandsOn organisation transitioned out of the neighbourhood. The United Saints main focus is to help communities affected by disasters and to revitalise economically distressed neighbourhoods. The United Saints Recovery Project operates out of First Street United Methodist Church on Dryades Street, New Orleans.

== Mission ==
From the United Saints Recovery Project website:

The mission of the United Saints' Recovery Project is to help revitalise economically distressed neighbourhoods of New Orleans afflicted by blight, affected by disasters, and to help those in need. Our focus is to assist the elderly, disabled, and otherwise disadvantaged in rehabilitating and rebuilding their homes, as well as engaging in community service, art, and beautification projects. We do this with the help of local, national, and international volunteers.

== History ==
In 2005, First Street Wesley United Methodist Church opened its doors to volunteers for their recovery efforts after Hurricane Katrina. The church, which was established in 1833 and long served as the center of the neighbourhood, was itself severely damaged from the storm, but nevertheless became the only relief center for Central City, New Orleans after the hurricane. In December, 2005, 'Mission Minnesota' arrived with a tractor-trailer full of supplies and more hands to help, including roofer Daryl Kiesow. After volunteering for a few weeks and fixing the church roof, Kiesow went back to Minnesota. He returned to New Orleans in 2007 and founded the United Saints Recovery Project after discovering that the volunteers that had formerly occupied the church had moved on to a different location and work in Central City had come to a halt.

The volunteers began to come once again. Approximately 55 homes were gutted and rebuilt that first year. Additionally, an abandoned church property at the corner of First Street and Dryades was rebuilt, supplied with bunk bed and opened up as housing for volunteers.

The United Saints Recovery project was officially chartered in 2008 to assist the disadvantaged home owners and distressed neighbourhoods of New Orleans.

== Articles ==
- Non-profits still key to driving recovery - Times-Picayune, September 10, 2009
- MC Students Spend Spring Break in New Orleans to Help Rebuild - April 10, 2009
- Group travels to New Orleans to give the gift of volunteering - December 24, 2008
