= 2nd Ward of New Orleans =

Coordinates: 29.946°N 90.081°W

Map of ward boundary

The 2nd Ward or Second Ward of New Orleans, Louisiana is one of the 17 wards of New Orleans.

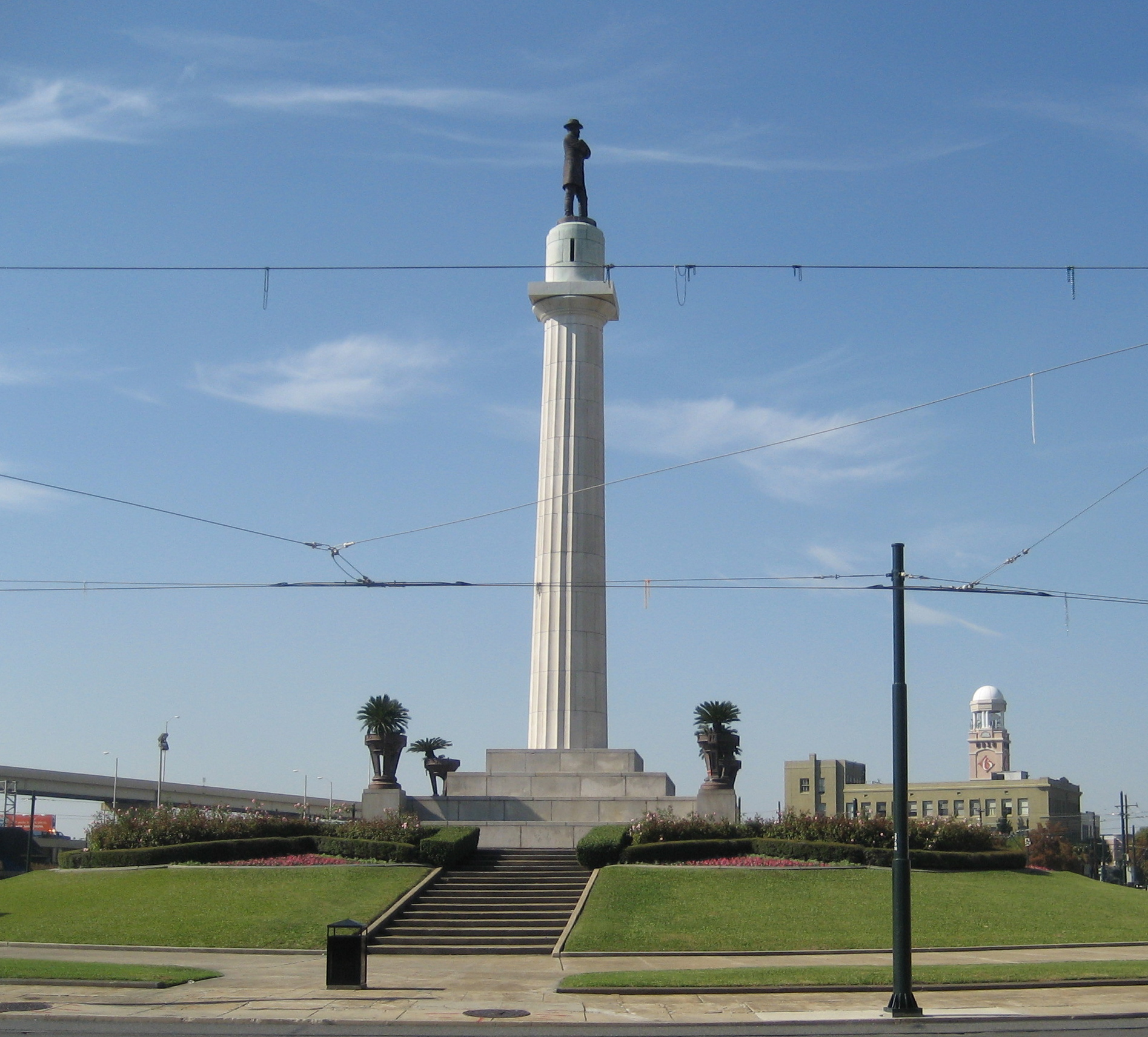
Lee Circle at New Orleans Central Business District in 2007

== Boundaries ==
The ward fronts the Mississippi River. The down-river or "lower" boundary (in this case, to the northeast) is Julia Street, across which is the 3rd Ward. The boundary continues inland from the end of Julia, originally delineated by the New Basin Canal, now I-10, over the former route of the filled-in canal. The upper boundary is Thalia Street, across which is the 1st Ward, then Martin Luther King Jr. Boulevard (formerly Melpomene Avenue), across from which are portions of the 10th and 11th Wards, then Washington Avenue, across which is the 14th Ward.

== Cityscape and landmarks ==
The area along the riverfront was part of the Old Warehouse District. The ward encompasses the upper portion of the New Orleans Central Business District, including Lee Circle, as well as a sliver of the Lower Garden District. Further inland the Ward continues through part of the Central City, including the B.W. Cooper or Calliope housing project.
