= 6th Ward of New Orleans =

Map of ward boundary

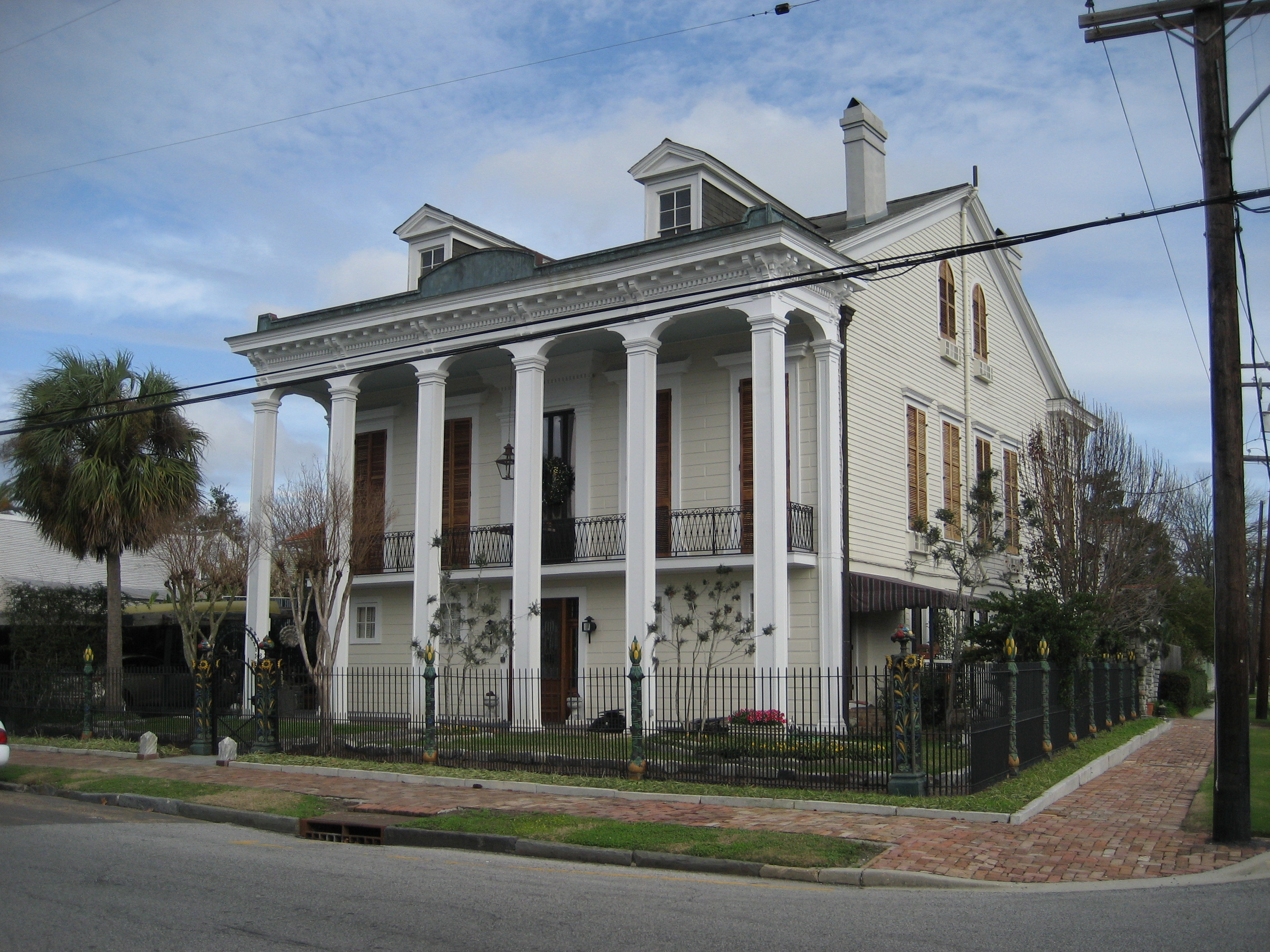
Dufour Plassan House on Esplanade Ridge

The 6th Ward or Sixth Ward is one of the seventeen wards of New Orleans, located in the Downtown section of the city of New Orleans, Louisiana.

== Boundaries ==
The 6th Ward is a long narrow ward stretching back from the Mississippi River. The boundary to down-river or "lower" side (to the north east in this case) is Esplanade Avenue, across which is the 7th Ward. The upper limit is Saint Philip Street, across which is the 5th Ward. The back boundary is Bayou St. John, the land across which is also part of the 5th Ward. This geographically small ward is just under 40 blocks from front to back, but only 4 blocks wide.

== Features and landmarks ==
At the Riverfront is the Governor Nicholls Street Wharf. Just back from the wharf is the lower terminus of the Riverfront Streetcar line. Continuing inland, beyond a flood wall, is the French Market and the old New Orleans Mint building, now a museum. Beyond a largely commercial section of Decatur Street, which includes some of the city's better known music clubs and bars, is the still largely residential section of the lower French Quarter. Cabrini Park is a piece of public green space here in the city's oldest urban neighborhood. On the other side of Rampart Street, the 6th Ward includes the heart of the Tremé neighborhood, including St. Augustine Church and the Backstreet Cultural Museum. The ward continues back along Esplanade Ridge, developed by the city's Creole communities in the 19th century, including elegant old mansions along Esplanade, one of which was the residence of Edgar Degas during the time he stayed with his relatives in the city. Just back from Broad St. is the former home of jazz musician Paul Mares, where the New Orleans Rhythm Kings rehearsed while they were in town. At the back of the ward along the bayou is the historic home of James Pitot, second Mayor of New Orleans, now the Pitot House museum.
