= 13th Ward of New Orleans =

Coordinates: 29°57′53″N 90°04′14″W

Map of ward boundary

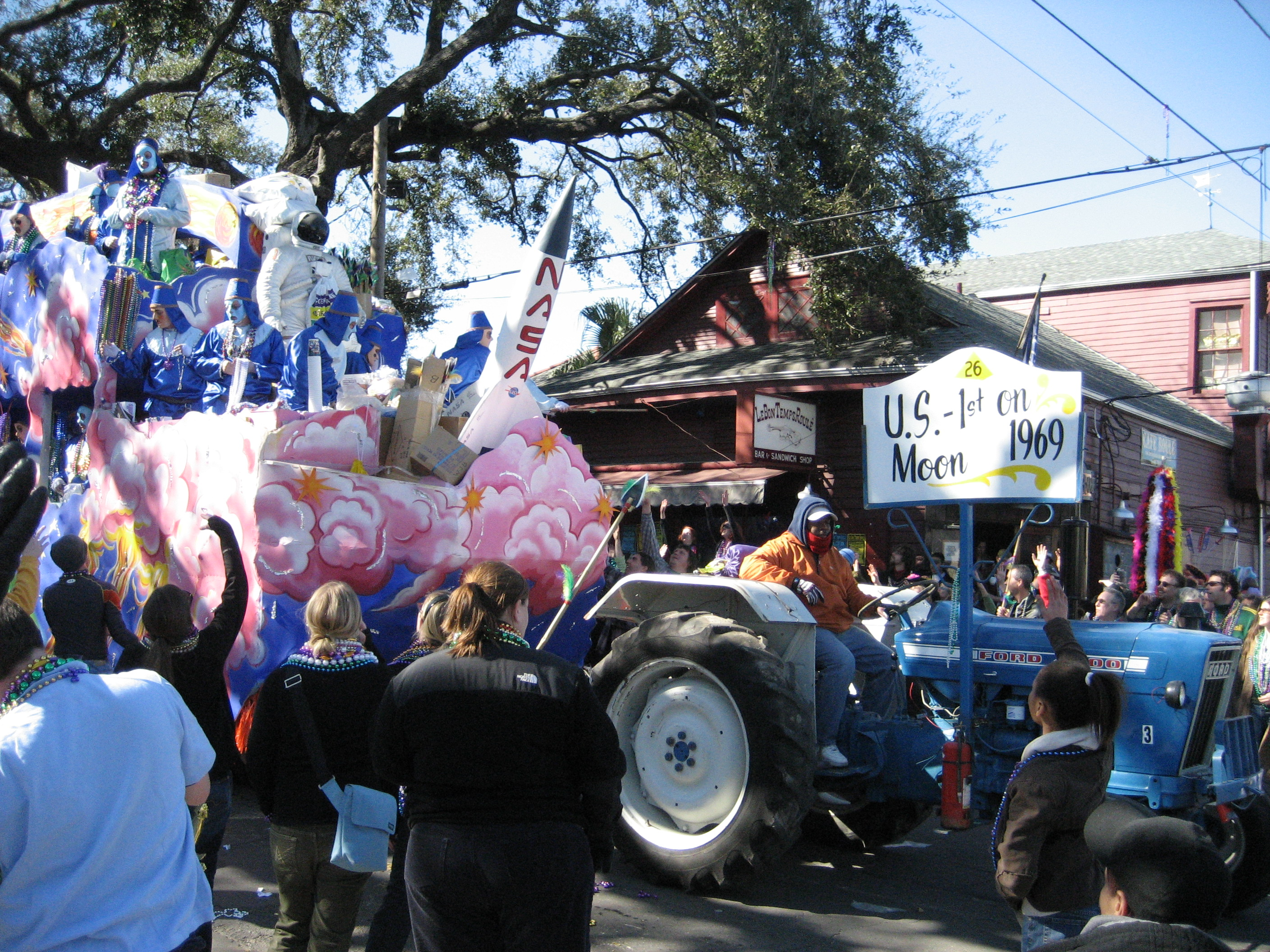
"Thoth" Mardi Gras parade on Magazine Street

The 13th Ward or Thirteenth Ward is a division of the city of New Orleans, Louisiana. It is one of the 17 wards of New Orleans. The ward was formerly part of the old Jefferson City annexed by New Orleans in 1870.

== Boundaries ==
The roughly wedge-shaped Ward stretches back from the Mississippi River. The lower boundary is Napoleon Avenue, across which is the 12th Ward. The upper boundary is Jefferson Avenue, across which is the 14th Ward, which also abuts the 13th's back boundary of South Broad. The 13th Ward includes a section of Uptown New Orleans and part of the Broadmoor neighborhood.

== Landmarks ==
Landmarks include the Academy of the Sacred Heart, De La Salle High School on St. Charles Avenue, Isidore Newman School, the New Orleans Academy of Fine Arts on Magazine Street, and Ochsner Baptist Medical Center on Napoleon Avenue. The Latter Branch of New Orleans Public Library is in an old mansion on St. Charles Avenue. The section of Freret Street in the 13th Ward is a vibrant commercial district, and home to events including the annual Freret Street Festival.

== Hurricane Katrina ==
Much of the 13th Ward on the lake side of St. Charles flooded badly in the aftermath of the failure of the Federal levee system during Hurricane Katrina in 2005.

== Notable residents ==
Notable 13th Warders have included The Neville Brothers, Joe Simon, B.G., VL Mike, Percy Humphrey, Willie Humphrey, Idris Muhammad, and Leon Roppolo. The Wild Tchoupitoulas were established in the 13th Ward. Lee Harvey Oswald had an apartment here for some time.
