= 16th Ward of New Orleans =

Coordinates: 29°54′24″N 90°03′24″W

Map of ward boundary

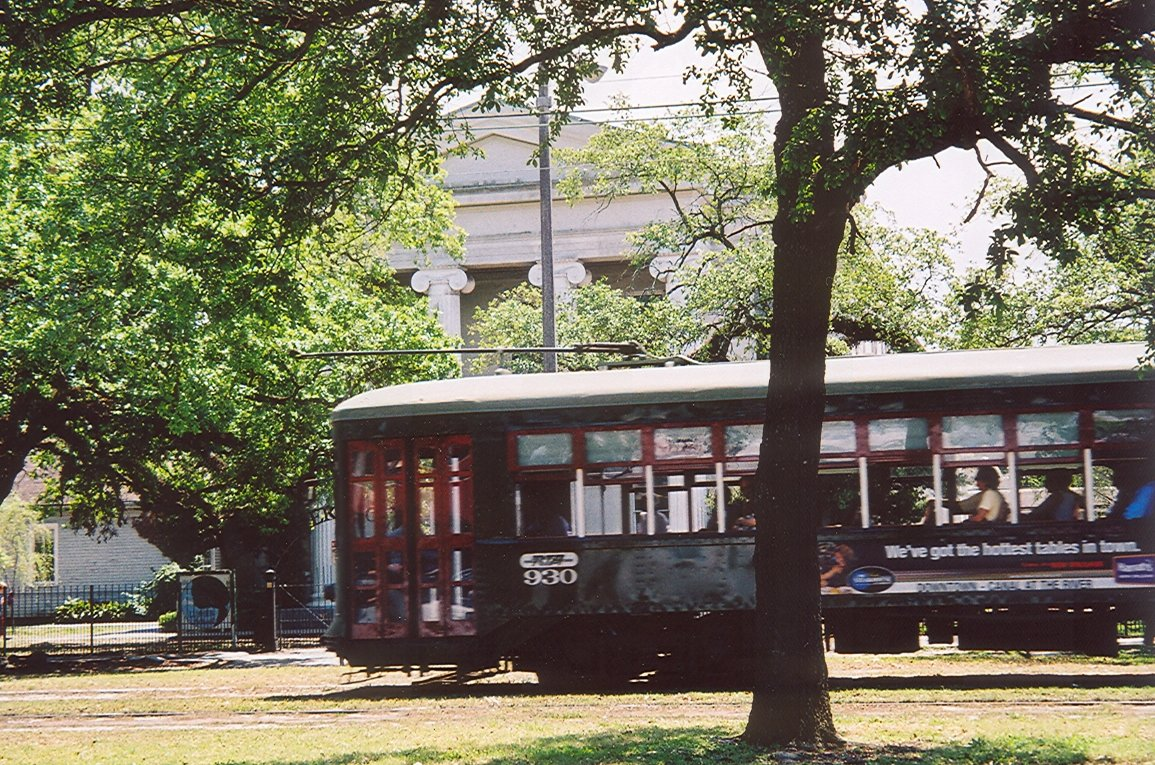
St. Charles Streetcar passes the old Carrollton City Hall Building on Carrollton Avenue, April, 2005

The 16th Ward or Sixteenth Ward is a division of the city of New Orleans, Louisiana, one of the 17 wards of New Orleans. It is an Uptown ward, along with the adjacent 17th Ward, formerly part of the city of Carrollton, Louisiana which was annexed by New Orleans in the 1870s.

== Boundaries ==
The 16th Ward stretches inland from the Mississippi River, with the upper boundary being Carrollton Avenue, across which is the 17th Ward, and the lower being Lowerline Street, across which is the 14th Ward. The back boundary was the New Basin Canal, now part of the route of I-10.

== Neighborhoods and landmarks ==
Going from the Riverfront back, the ward includes part of the Mississippi River levee used as a linear park. Atop a section of the levee is the regional office of the U.S. Army Corps of Engineers.

Across Leake Avenue (still called "River Road" by many locals) is the Black Pearl neighborhood. The ward continues back across St. Charles Avenue, route of the famous St. Charles Streetcar Line.

The Old Carrollton Courthouse formerly served as a courthouse, jail and school, in which capacity it served until its last charter school tenant moved in 2013. Designed by architect Henry Howard, the building's construction was completed in 1855. It sat vacant for seven years. It was sold by the Orleans Parish School Board to private developers in 2018, and it reopened in February 2023 as a luxury assisted living facility for senior citizens.

The Lower or East Carrollton neighborhood contains much fine wooden 19th century residential architecture, and Maple Street, an old mixed commercial/residential neighborhood main street, with shops, restaurants, bars, and coffee shops, is popular with both locals and students of nearby Tulane University and Loyola University New Orleans.

At the corner of S. Carrollton Avenue and Willow Street is the Nix Library, which opened in 1930. The lot, upon which the library sits, was donated to the City of New Orleans by James, Ralph, and John Nix in order to build a library in memory of their parents.

The old residential neighborhood, with occasional corner stores, continues back to wide Claiborne Avenue, across which is the upper edge of the Fontainebleau neighborhood. On Carrollton Avenue the Notre Dame Seminary is the residence of the Archbishop of New Orleans, where Pope John Paul II stayed during his visit to New Orleans in 1987.

Back from Earhart Boulevard was the former location of Lincoln Park and Johnson Park, where musicians including Buddy Bolden, Bunk Johnson, and John Robichaux played in the early years of the 20th century, now a mixed commercial and residential area.

The Gert Town, New Orleans neighborhood continues back to Xavier University of Louisiana, at the back end of the Ward, adjacent to I-10.

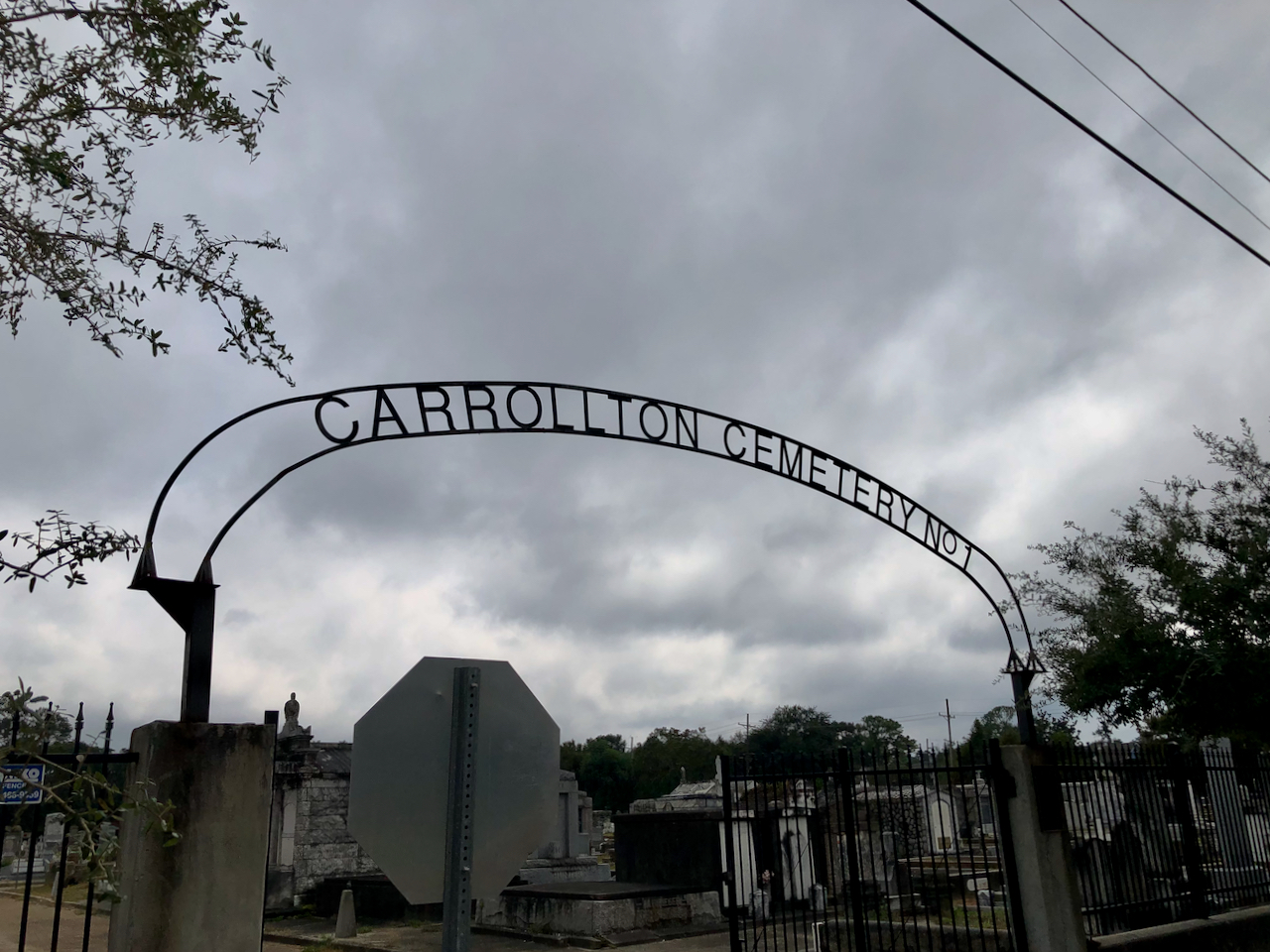
Arched iron gateway over the entrance to Carrollton Cemetery No.1 at Adams and Green Streets in New Orleans, Louisiana.

Established in 1849, Carrollton Cemetery No.1 was founded as the municipal cemetery for the suburb of Carrollton, and later annexed to the City of New Orleans in 1874. Also referred to as the Green Street Cemetery, Carrollton Cemetery No.1 covers a four block area, and is bounded by Adams, Hickory, Birch, and Lowerline Streets. The cemetery is dominated by in-ground burials with several aisles of above-ground tombs. Located one block away is Carrollton Cemetery No.2, also known as St. Mary's Cemetery as it was formerly the property of the Catholic Church (St. Mary’s Nativity). Like Carrollton Cemetery No.1, Carrollton Cemetery No.2 is bounded on the east side by Lowerline Street. It covers 2 blocks, and is bounded on the other three sides by Adams, Spruce, and Cohn Streets.

== Hurricane Katrina ==
In the general flooding of New Orleans in the aftermath of Hurricane Katrina in 2005, most of the ward from about Green Street back was flooded, while most of the area from around Freret Street to the Mississippi River was above the flood waters. The dry area experienced extensive looting in the aftermath of the storm and levee failure.

The area was hit on February 13, 2007 by a EF2 tornado that tossed a stretch of Hillary Street before bouncing across St. Charles Avenue and Carrollton Avenue near Jeannette Street.
