= Wards of New Orleans =

Electoral divisions

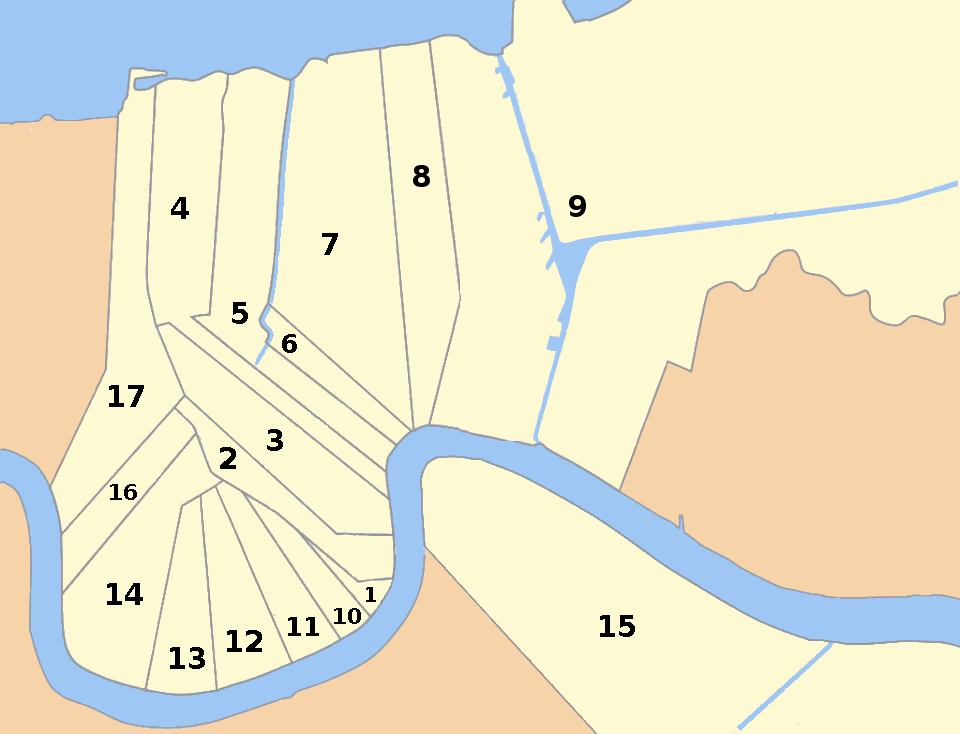
Map shows the 17 wards of New Orleans. Not shown: southern portion of the 15th Ward, northeastern portion of the 9th Ward. On the map Lake Pontchartrain is to the north and the Mississippi River is to the south; the 15th Ward is the only one south of the Mississippi River where Algiers is located.

The city of New Orleans, in the U.S. state of Louisiana, is divided into 17 wards. Politically, the wards are used in voting in elections, subdivided into precincts. Under various previous city charters of the 19th century, aldermen and later city council members were elected by ward. The city has not had officials elected to represent wards since 1912, but the ward designations remain a part of New Orleans' fabric. Socially, it is not uncommon for New Orleanians from some wards to identify where they are from by their ward number.

== History ==
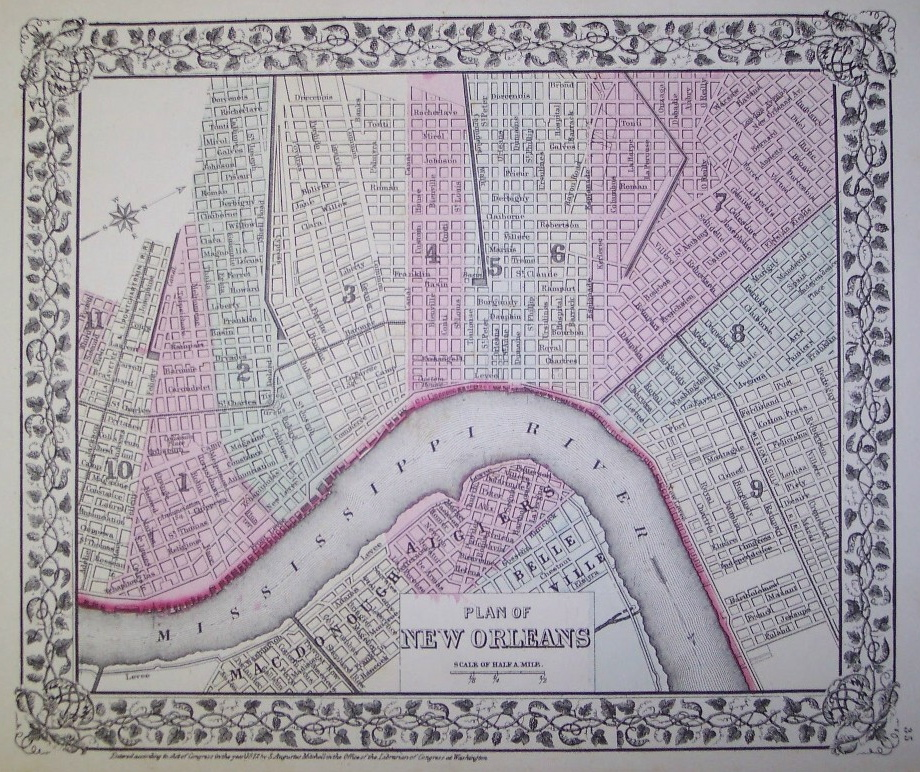
Map showing the first 11 Wards of New Orleans, c. 1870 or before

Most of the boundaries of Wards 1 through 11 were drawn in 1852 when the city was reorganized from three separate municipalities into one centralized government. With various changes, these boundaries remain largely the same, and have not changed at all since the 1880s. The rest of the Wards were formed from the expansion of the city boundaries in the 1870s. The 12th, 13th, and 14th Wards were formed by annexation of land up river from the older city of New Orleans that had been Jefferson City and Greenville; the 15th by the annexation of the city of Algiers, across the Mississippi River from the rest of the city, and finally the 16th and 17th Wards formed from the annexed city of Carrollton.

Beginning in the 1980s, residents began to give new cultural meaning to wards as part of their local identity. Extremely prevalent in New Orleans hip hop (particularly Bounce Music), jazz, and other local genres of music, the concepts of "calling out" one's ward (stating the ward of one's residence), and "throwing up" one's ward (holding one's digits on one or both hands to signify their ward) have become mainstays of local culture and are even embraced casually at culturally mainstream events such as the New Orleans Jazz & Heritage Festival. Although this practice is often seen as overly territorial and hostile, sometimes blamed for inciting violence, many simply see it as a friendly camaraderie shared with one's neighborhood.

== Uptown wards | Maps ==
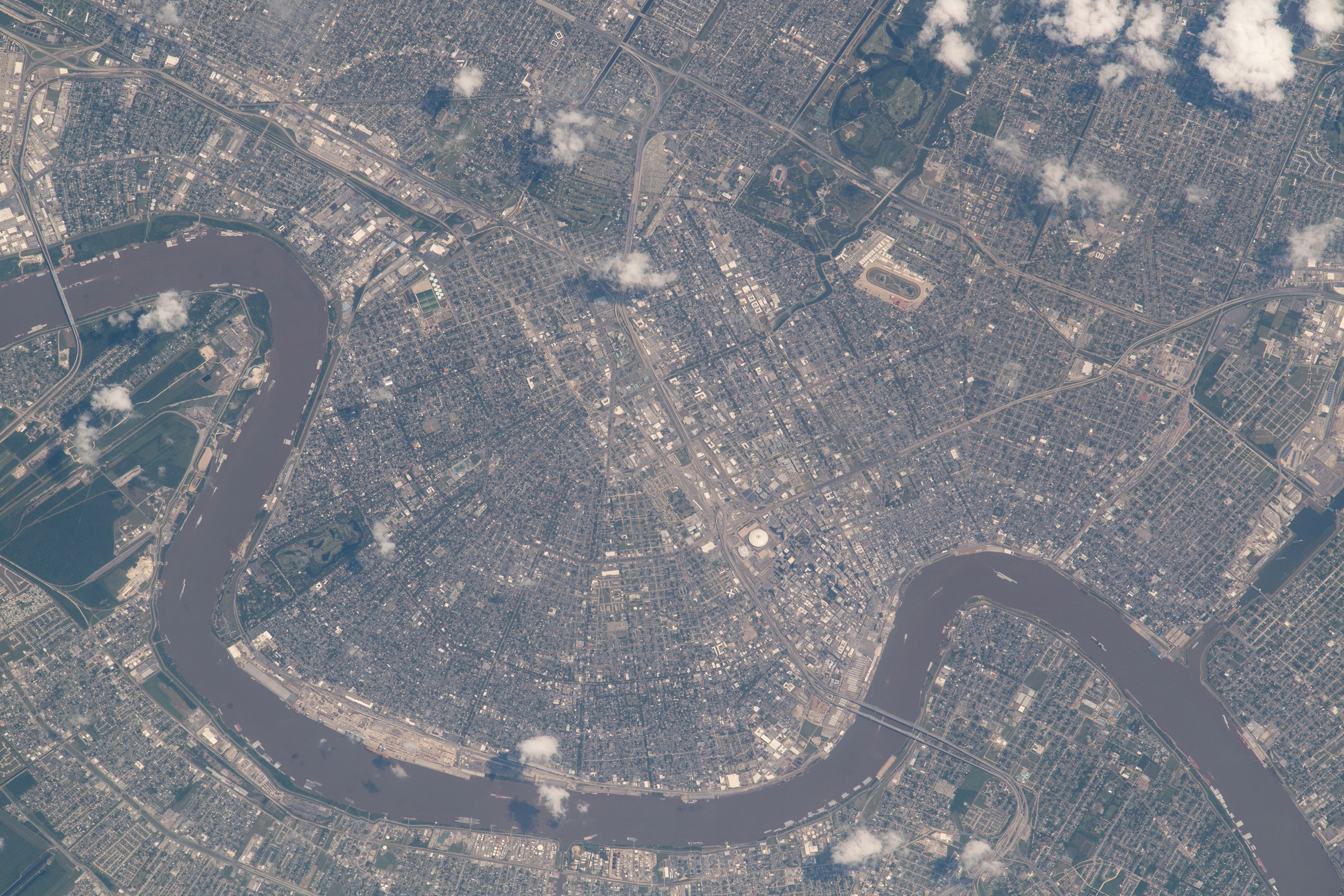
In many cases, the angles of the streets correspond with the angles formed by borders of the wards. Taken from the International Space Station on June 28, 2022.

- 1st Ward | Map of 1st Ward
- 2nd Ward | | Map of 2nd Ward
- 3rd Ward | | Map of 3rd Ward
- 10th Ward | Map of 10th Ward
- 11th Ward | Map of 11th Ward
- 12th Ward | Map of 12th Ward
- 13th Ward | Map of 13th Ward
- 14th Ward | Map of 14th Ward
- 16th Ward | Map of 16th Ward
- 17th Ward | Map of 17th Ward

== Downtown wards | Maps ==
- 4th Ward | Map of 4th Ward
- 5th Ward | Map of 5th Ward
- 6th Ward | Map of 6th Ward
- 7th Ward | Map of 7th Ward
- 8th Ward | Map of 8th Ward
- 9th Ward | Map of 9th Ward

== West Bank ward | Map ==
- 15th Ward (Algiers) | Map of 15th Ward (Algiers)

== Works cited ==
- Campanella, Richard (2017). Cityscapes of New Orleans. LSU Press. ISBN 9780807168332.

== See also ==
- Neighborhoods in New Orleans
- Housing Projects of New Orleans
