= 1st Ward of New Orleans =

Map of ward boundary

The 1st Ward or First Ward is one of the 17 wards of New Orleans, divisions of the city of New Orleans, Louisiana. It is geographically one of the smaller wards of the city. Roughly triangular in shape, the boundaries are Thalia Street (below which is the city's 2nd Ward), Felicity Street (above which is the 10th Ward), and the Mississippi River. The majority of this is in the historic Lower Garden District.

== History ==
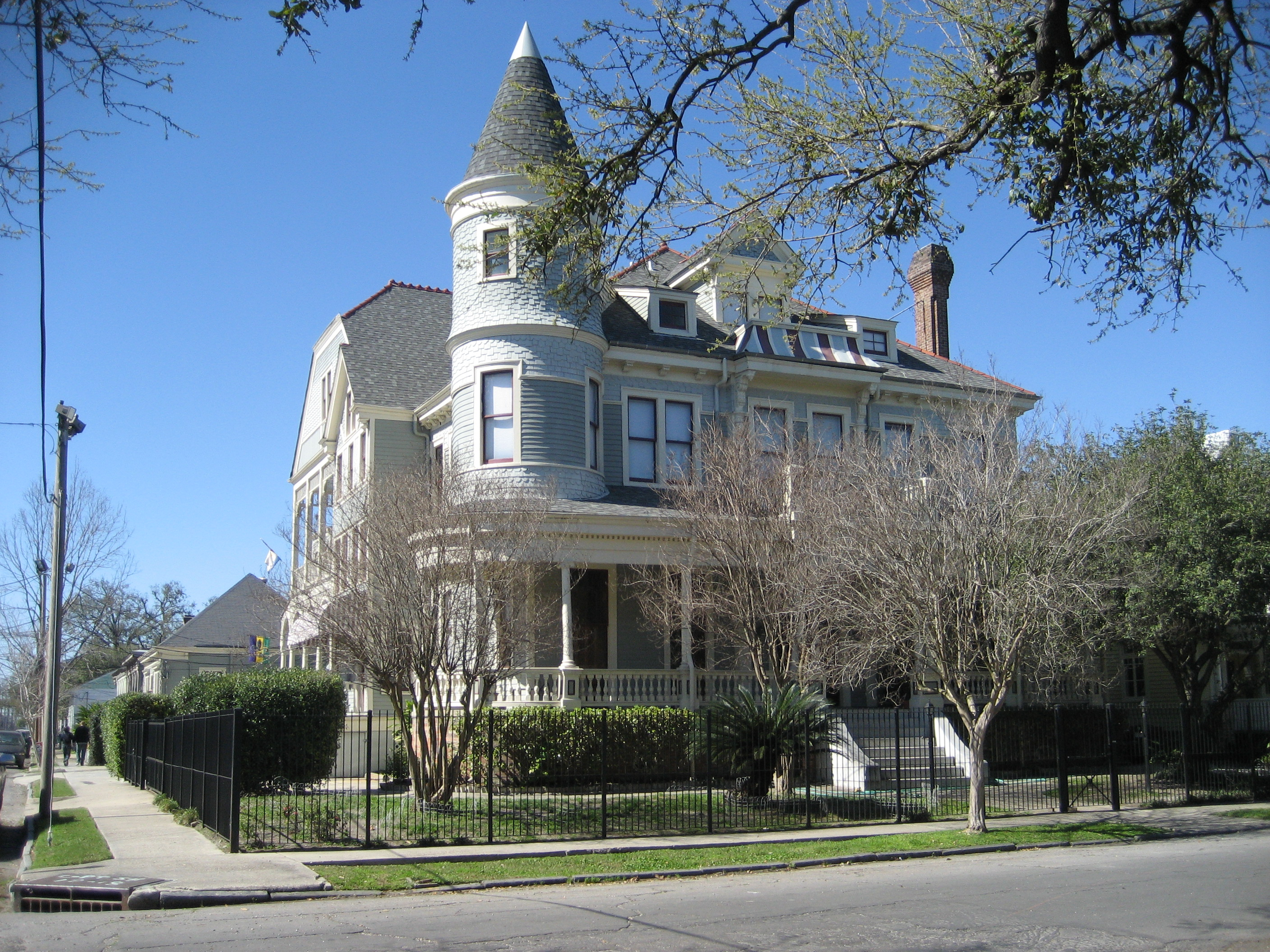
House on Coliseum Square

This was an area of Uptown New Orleans urbanized in the early decades of the 19th century. Despite the "First" designation, this was neither the oldest section of the city nor its seat of government. The current "1st Ward" was a result of a redrawing of divisions within the city in 1852, prior to which the city had been governed for a generation as 3 separate municipalities, each with its own wards. The First Ward of the newly unified city was designated as identical to the boundaries of the First Ward of the old 2nd Municipality as designated in 1847.
