= Faubourg Livaudais =

Human settlement in New Orleans, Louisiana, United States of America

- Neighborhood
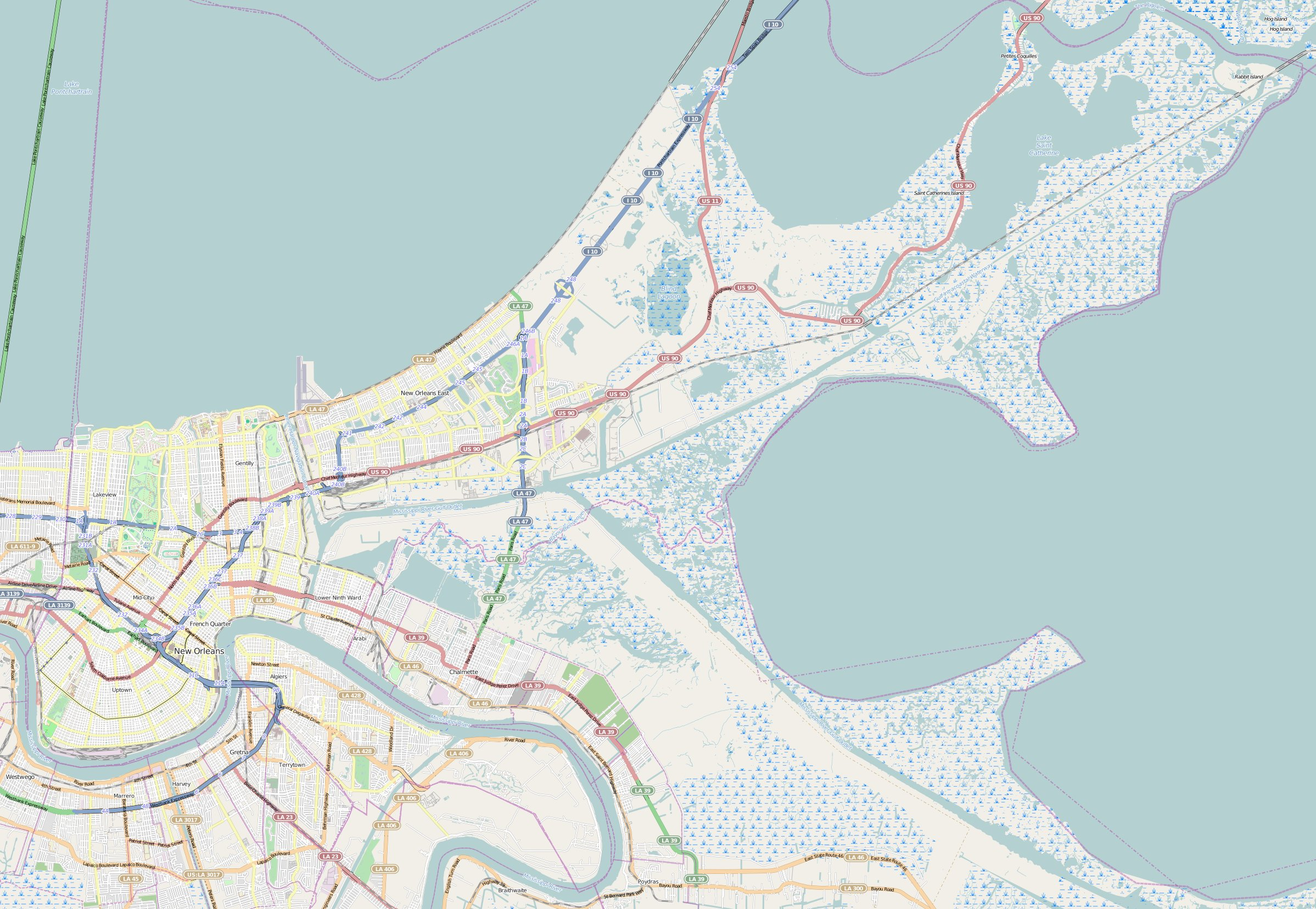
- Location within New Orleans Faubourg Livaudais (Louisiana) Faubourg Livaudais (the United States)
- Country: United States
- State: Louisiana
- City: New Orleans
- Founded: 1832
- Founder: Marie Celeste Marigny

Population
  - Demographics: Majority African American
- Time zone: UTC-6 (Central (CST))
  - Summer (DST): UTC-5 (CDT)
- Area code: 504

The Faubourg Livaudais is a name of a neighborhood in central New Orleans. The neighborhood is largely residential and contains mostly modest sized homes.

== History ==
The Faubourg Livaudais was a historical plantation located in Uptown New Orleans in Louisiana. The wife of Jacques Francois Enoul de Livaudais, Marie Celeste Marigny, sold her plantation to a syndicate of American businessmen. When the property was subdivided by the surveyor of Jefferson Parish, the Faubourg Livaudais was the name given to the neighborhood, founded in 1832. In the 19th century, many of the neighborhoods in the Jefferson Parish area were termed "faubourgs," a French word that was at the time roughly analogous to the modern concept of a suburb. These faubourgs were sometimes named after the plantations owner’s last name.

When the neighborhood was first founded it was majority Americans, as opposed to French, Spanish or Creole. Caucasians took up most of the neighborhood but that gradually changed over the years. African Americans took up a large amount of the population and currently make up the majority of the inhabitants. Many people from different cultures and backgrounds stay in the area and live in a historical home.

Following Hurricane Katrina, there was activity in the neighborhood restoring houses and building new homes on vacant lots.

== Geography and landmarks ==
The neighborhood boundaries are located from St. Charles to Simon Bolivar and Jackson to Washington. The Faubourg Livaudais is a subsection of the area that many residents refer to as Central City, the Garden District, or Uptown, depending on the exact location. There is one school within the boundaries of the neighborhood—James Singleton Charter School. However, other public charter and private schools are nearby.

The Faubourg Livaudais area is within the National Register Central City Historic District and has many historical buildings and institutions, including about twenty churches throughout the area. The former Dryades Public Library branch opened in 1915 with funding from Andrew Carnegie. It was the first public library in New Orleans that was open to black citizens. The building is currently used by the James Singleton Charter School.

== Demographics ==
The neighborhood is majority African American.
