= Brown's Velvet Dairy =

American dairy manufacturer

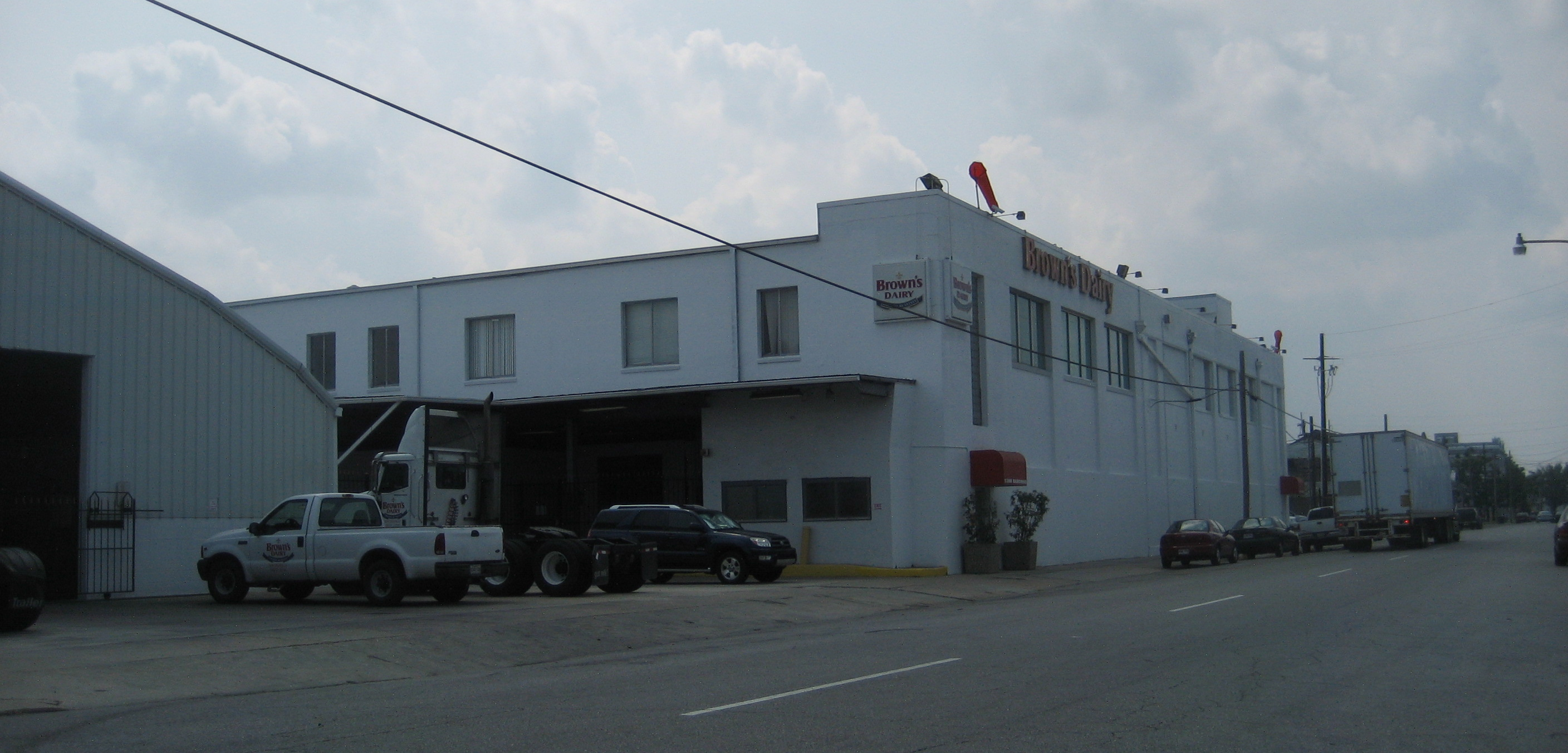
Brown's Dairy plant in Central City, New Orleans

Brown's Velvet Dairy, now Brown's Dairy, is a historic business in the Central City section of New Orleans, Louisiana, USA. It was opened in 1905.

Brown's Velvet was the oldest and largest dairy company in New Orleans and served the Gulf States market area. Ice cream flavors included Creole cream cheese. Marigold Foods purchased the Brown's Velvet Ice Cream division in 1993 to expand its line of Kemps frozen desserts. The milk business was retained.

In order to stay in New Orleans, Brown's had made a deal with the city for a one-block stretch of Thalia Street. The dairy was initially bought out by Southern Foods Group which also acquired Barbe's and Walker-Roemer, two other area dairy companies.

Brown's Dairy is now a line of Dean Foods.
