= Magnolia Projects =

C. J. Peete Housing Development
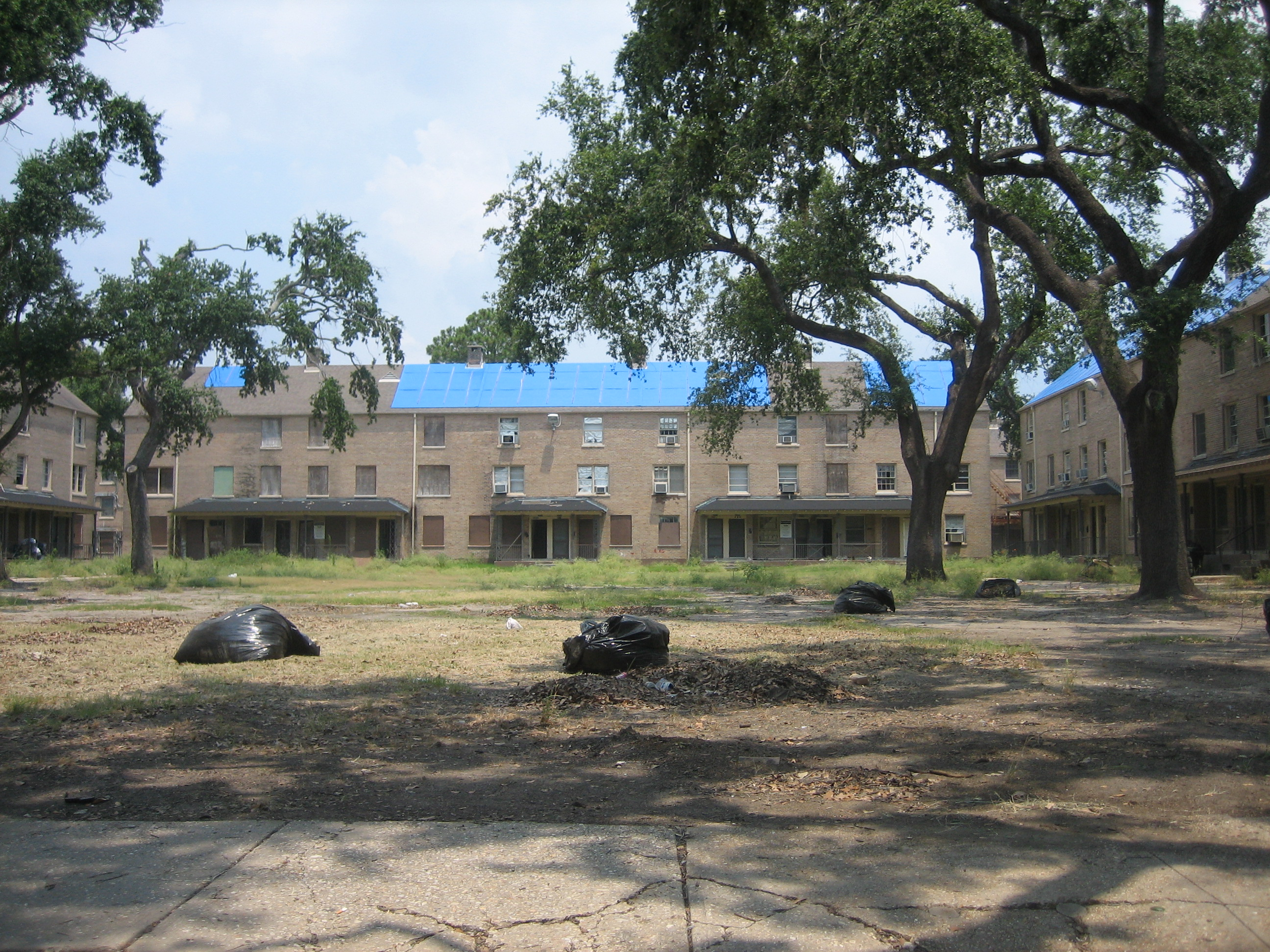
- Damaged Magnolia Projects after Hurricane Katrina 2006
- Interactive map of C. J. Peete Housing Development

General information
- Location: 3320 Clara Street, New Orleans, LA 70113; United States
- Status: Demolished

Construction
- Constructed: 1940–41

Listing
- Demolished: 2001-2008

Other information
- Governing body: Housing Authority of New Orleans
- Famous residents: Kelly Oubre Jr. Soulja Slim, Juvenile, Patrick Surtain, Turk, Jay Electronica Yahya Abdul-Mateen II

- Magnolia Street Housing Project
- U.S. National Register of Historic Places
- U.S. National Historic Landmark
- Location within Louisiana Location within the United States
- NRHP reference No.: 99001038
- Added to NRHP: 1999

The Magnolia Projects, later the C. J. Peete Public Housing Development, was one of the Housing Projects of New Orleans. The area has been more recently renamed Harmony Oaks as part of a complete HOPE VI redevelopment of the property. As a housing project, it was among the largest, housing approximately 2,100 people. It is also home to numerous hip-hop artists and is located in the part of uptown New Orleans known as Central City within the 11th Ward of New Orleans. It was bounded by Louisiana Avenue, South Claiborne Avenue, La Salle Street and Washington Avenue. The Magnolia Projects was made famous by rappers such as Juvenile, Soulja Slim, and Magnolia Shorty. At its height, the Magnolia projects had 1403 units.

== History ==
The first part of the project was constructed in 1941, bordered by Louisiana Avenue, Magnolia Street, Washington Avenue and LaSalle Street. In 1955, the complex was expanded north past Clara Street, incorporating about six additional city blocks. Toledano Street was re-aligned a few years after the 1955 expansion, resulting in the disappearance of a three-block-long residential street named Belmont Place. The only remnants of Belmont Place are three houses facing Toledano before it joins with Louisiana Avenue. During the Jim Crow laws era of racial segregation, the city's main medical care facility for African-Americans, Flint Goodridge Hospital, was on the southwest end of Freret Street on Louisiana Avenue. The first three African American mayors of New Orleans were born at Flint Goodridge. From 1952 through 1978, the manager was Cleveland Joseph Peete. In the 1980s and 1990s, conditions in the projects had been neglected and had declined severely during the crack cocaine epidemic. Crime and drug activity increased as well as police patrols. In 2001-02, demolition of portions of the projects began as part of a Housing Authority of New Orleans (HANO) revitalization plan. By 2005, only the 1955 expansion had been razed. The majority of the remaining buildings were vacant and fenced off, with only a portion still occupied, when the area flooded in the aftermath of Hurricane Katrina (see: Effects of Hurricane Katrina in New Orleans). Redevelopment work was delayed in the aftermath of the disastrous flood, which devastated the majority of the city. As of late 2008, the Magnolia Projects had been vacated and the majority of buildings razed. On January 7, 2009, local, state, federal and HUD officials met to break ground on a new $183 million C.J. Peete community meant to replace the Magnolia Projects. The plans include 460 units, a Recovery School District school and YMCA in the first phase. 2/3 of the community will be mixed-use and mixed-income, with the rest being market value apartments and town homes.

In 2011, the rebranded Harmony Oaks community, developed by McCormack Baron Salazar, opened as a mixed-use community of 460 apartments and homes, including public housing, low income and market-rate dwellings. The new Harmony Oaks, redeveloped on the old Magnolia Projects site, is located on some 41 acres southeast of the intersection of Claiborne and Louisiana Aves. The site is bounded by Washington Ave. to the east, LaSalle St. and Freret St. to the south, Louisiana and Toledano Aves. to the west, and S. Claiborne Ave. to the north. The redeveloped projects are a continuation of New Orleans' move towards new urbanism, favoring urban neighborhood development over suburban sprawl.

== Cultural contributions ==
Although the project is within the 11th and 12th Wards, natives label it as the 3rd Ward; however, the 3rd Ward of New Orleans is located in the Central Business District. The various New Orleans housing projects are most notable for being the launching ground for bounce and New Orleans rap. The most well-known artists to come out of the Magnolia Projects are Juvenile and Turk, members of the Hot Boys, a rap group who started their careers on Cash Money Records, a record label started by Magnolia residents Birdman and Slim tha Don. The label shot to fame in the late 1990s and is still popular today. Other popular artists from the area include Soulja Slim, Mr. Marcelo, Magnolia Shorty, and Jay Electronica. The district is often referred to as Magnolia or Nolia. The Magnolia has been the scene of Juvenile's hit song "Nolia Clap", a dance inspired by the Magnolia Projects. The Magnolia Projects has also been home to sculptor Willie Birch. The park on La Salle in the Projects, A.L. Davis Park (named after Abraham Lincoln Davis, the first African-American to serve on the New Orleans City Council), has long been a frequent site of brass band parades, and an important gathering site for Mardi Gras Indians tribes. Under the old name of "Shakespere Park" (originally commemorating New Orleans mayor Joseph A. Shakspeare), it is mentioned in the lyrics of Professor Longhair and Papa Celestin. The housing project was also mentioned in Playboi Carti's song, "Magnolia", released on his self-titled debut mixtape in 2017. It was also mentioned in Future's song, "2Pac", released on his 2014 mixtape Monster.
