= 14th Ward of New Orleans =

Coordinates: 29.937°N 90.119°W

Map of ward boundary

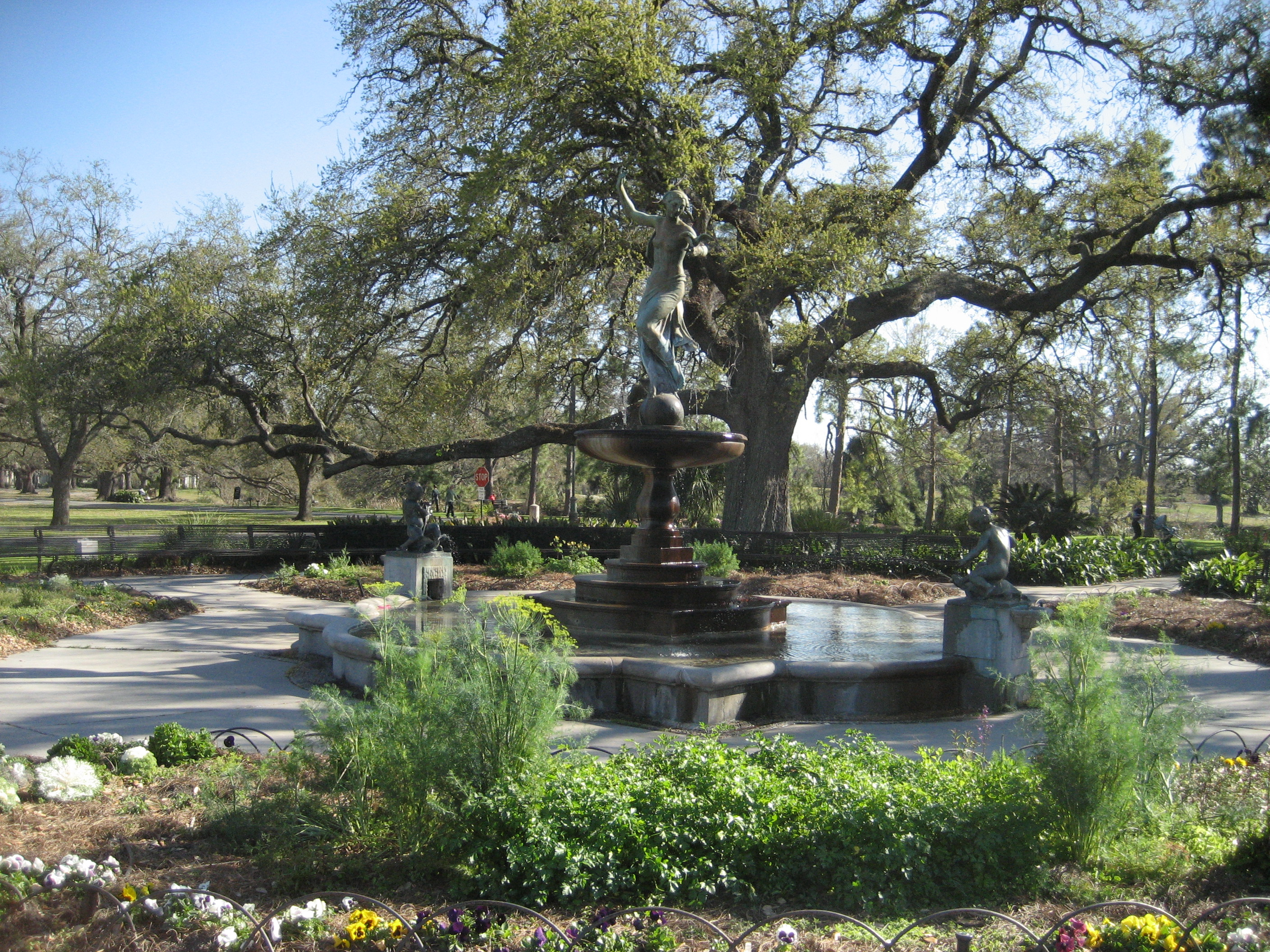
Audubon Park

The 14th Ward or Fourteenth Ward is a section of the city of New Orleans, Louisiana, one of the 17 Wards of New Orleans. The Ward was formed in 1870 from part of Jefferson City and the town of Greenville, which were annexed by New Orleans.

== Boundaries ==
The ward is roughly shaped like a wide "L" stretching back from the Mississippi River. The lower boundary is Jefferson Avenue and then South Broad, across which is the 13th Ward. The upper boundary is Lowerline Street (formerly the lower boundary of the city of Carrollton with Greenville), across which is the 16th Ward. The back boundary is Washington Avenue, across which is a portion of the 2nd Ward.

== Cityscape and landmarks ==
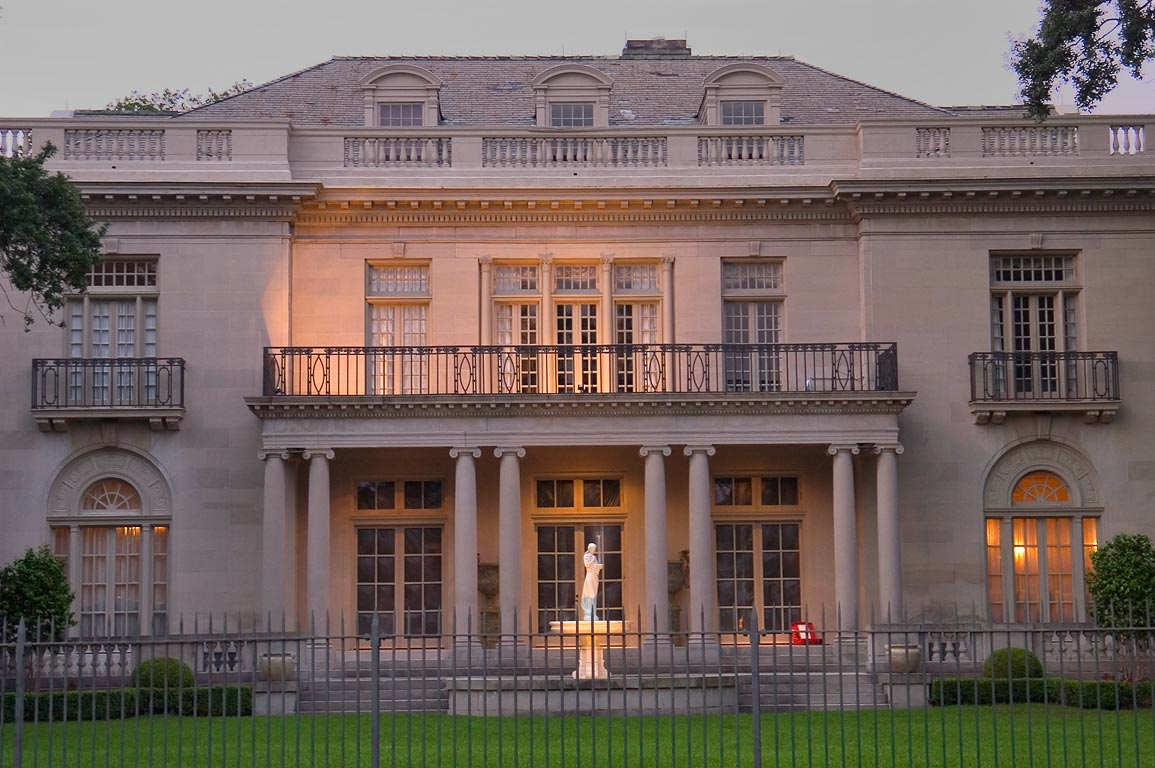
The Historic Benjamin House on St. Charles Avenue

The ward includes some of the most famous landmarks of Uptown New Orleans. The site of the World Cotton Centennial 1884 World's Fair is now Audubon Zoo and Audubon Park. The area around the Park contains a number of architecturally-significant mansions. Across Saint Charles Avenue, route of the famous St. Charles Streetcar Line, are Tulane University and Loyola University New Orleans.

The former site of Dominican College, just up from Broadway Street, is also in the Ward; it is now a satellite campus of Loyola. The "Fraternity Row" is along Broadway Street, and around Broadway Street and Freret Street is a cluster of businesses catering to the university communities. Notable commercial areas include the upriver portion of Magazine Street, Uptown Square shopping center on Broadway, and the Calhoun Street area, back from Claiborne Avenue. Farther back from Claiborne Avenue, the Ward includes part of the Fontainebleau and Broadmoor neighborhoods.

== See also ==
- Audubon Park
- Uptown New Orleans
