= Success Preparatory Academy =

Charter school in Louisiana, United States

Coordinates: 29°58′44.5″N 90°6′21.5″W

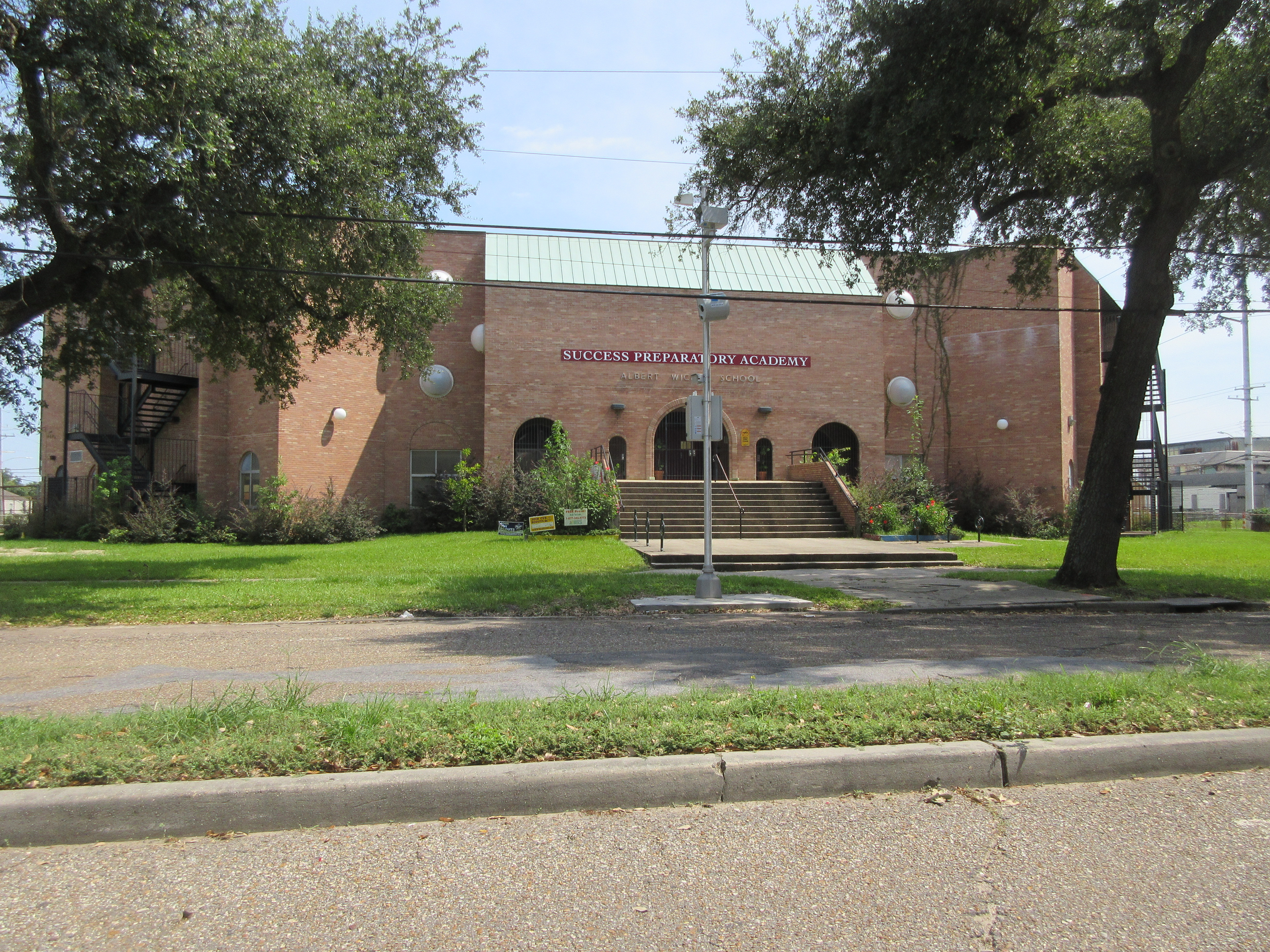
- Success Preparatory Academy in 2017 when it was housed in the former Albert Wicker School building

Location
- New Orleans, Louisiana, United States; United States

Information
- Type: Charter school
- Established: 2009
- Founder: St. Claire Adriaan and Niloy Gangopadhyay
- Grades: Kindergarten - 8th grade
- Website: Success Preparatory Academy website

Success Preparatory Academy is a charter school in New Orleans, Louisiana. It serves students from Kindergarten through the 8th grade.

Success Prep was founded in 2009. It was co-founded by St. Claire Adriaan and Niloy Gangopadhyay. Adriaan left to join IDEA Public Schools in Texas in 2013.

Success Preparatory Academy previous home had building issues and the school used partitions to divide classrooms. As of 2018, the school has moved into a new home at the Thurgood Marshall building, approximately two miles from the previous site.

It has been rated a C school for 2017–2018.
