= 3rd Ward of New Orleans =

Coordinates: 29.962°N 90.091°W

Map of ward boundary

The 3rd Ward or Third Ward is one of the 17 wards of New Orleans, a division of the city of New Orleans, Louisiana.

== Boundaries ==
The ward touches the Mississippi River as its front. The down-river boundary is Canal Street, below which is the city's 4th Ward. The upper boundary is Julia Street, originally the New Basin Canal. The former canal route in this area is now I-10. For most of this route from the river back is the 2nd Ward. From Carrollton Avenue up it borders the 17th Ward. The back boundary is City Park Avenue (formerly known as Bayou Metairie Road), across which is another portion of the 4th Ward.

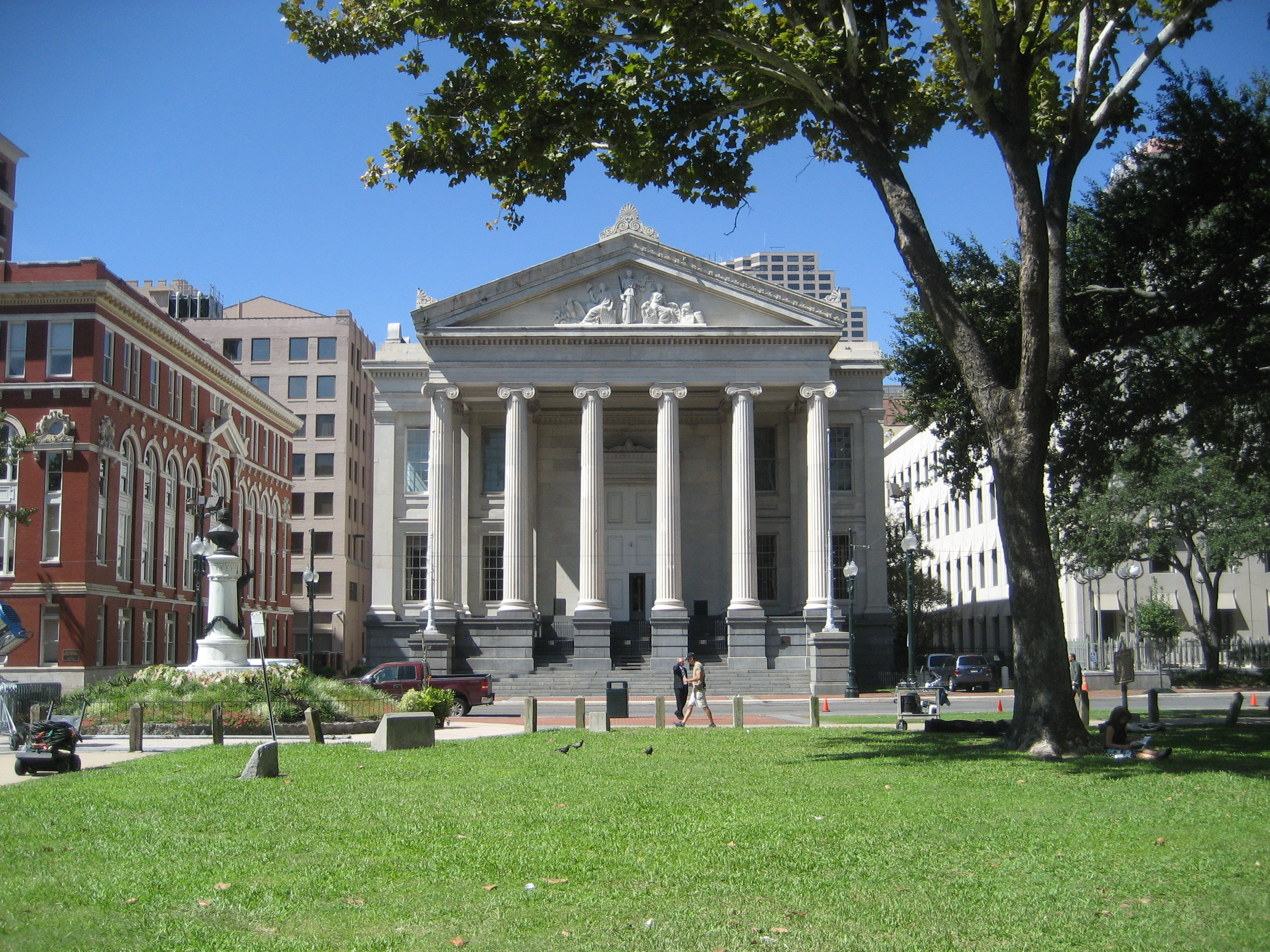
Gallier Hall on Lafayette Square

== Features and landmarks ==
The 3rd Ward encompasses the majority of the Central Business District near the River. The Ward includes the city's seat of government, both the old 19th century City Hall on Lafayette Square and the new City Hall Complex on Loyola Avenue. Farther back from the Central Business District is the Tulane/Gravier neighborhood. At Tulane and Broad are the Courthouse and Orleans Parish Prison. Continuing back, the Ward includes a large section of the Mid City neighborhood. Due to the devastation of Hurricane Katrina in 2005, much of the 3rd ward area was damaged.

== Notable people ==
Notable people of the 3rd Ward include Louis Armstrong, Birdman, C-Murder, Big Freedia, Jay Electronica, Dr. John, Juvenile, Mac, Mr. Marcelo, Master P, Silkk The Shocker, Soulja Slim, Turk, Ronnie Virgets and Morris Mayfield III.
