= 11th Ward of New Orleans =

Coordinates: 29.911718°N 90.057891°W

Map of ward boundary

The 11th Ward or Eleventh Ward is a division of the city of New Orleans, Louisiana. The 11th Ward is one of the 17 Wards of New Orleans.

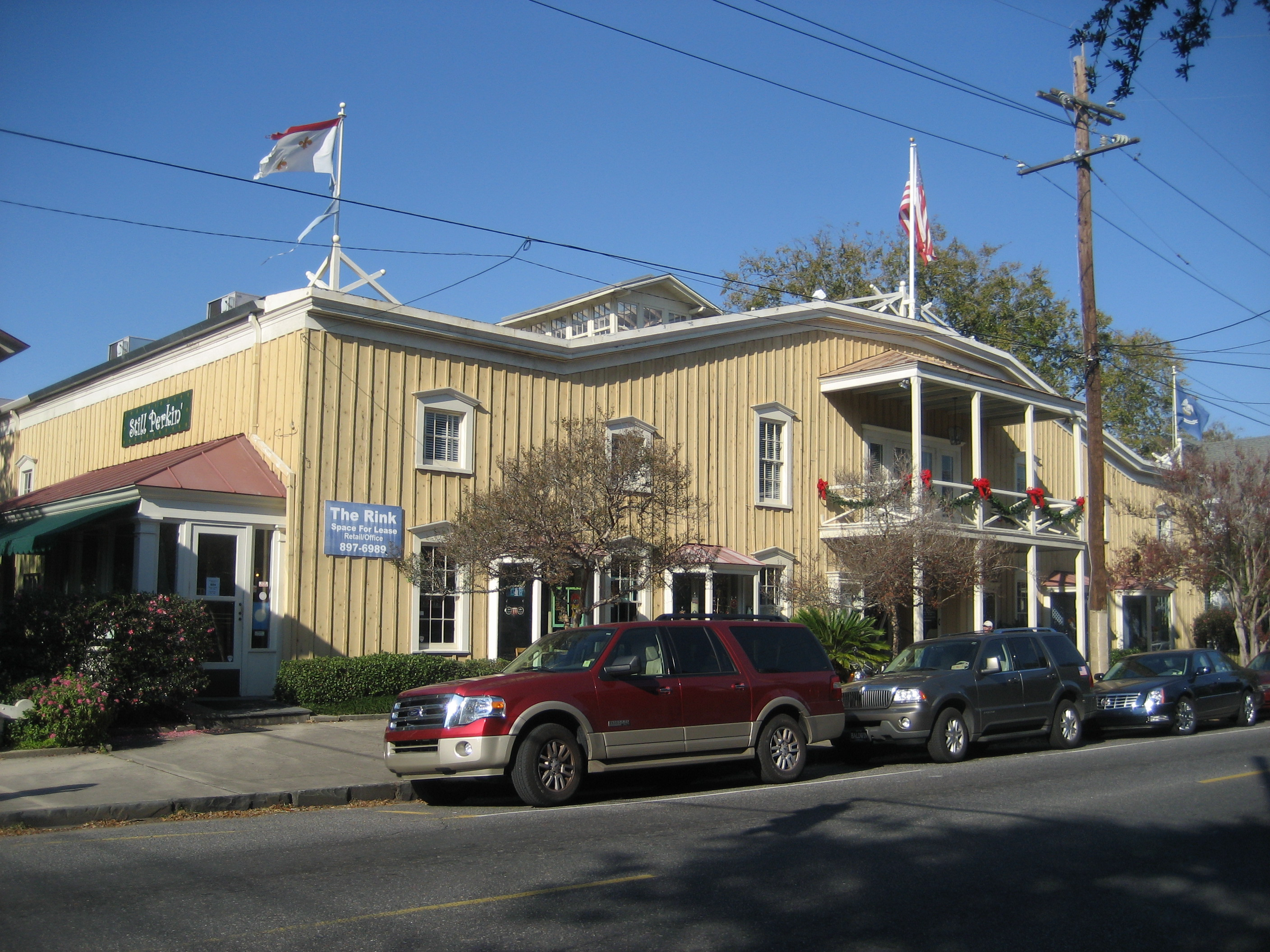
19th century skating rink on Prytania Street now houses shops

The ward was formerly part of the old Lafayette Faubourg annexed by New Orleans in the 1850s. It is part of Uptown New Orleans.

== Boundaries ==
The roughly wedge-shaped Ward stretches back from the Mississippi River. The lower boundary is First Street, across which is the 10th Ward, then Martin Luther King Jr. Boulevard (formerly Melpomene Avenue), across which is the 2nd Ward. The upper boundary is Toledano Street, across which is the 12th Ward.

== Cityscape and landmarks ==
The ward includes portions of the Irish Channel, Garden District, most of Faubourg Delassize, and a number of housing projects. Landmarks include Lafayette Cemetery, Commander's Palace, and Thomy Lafon School. The majority of the Magnolia Projects are in the 11th Ward.
