= Central City, New Orleans =

Central City
- Neighborhood
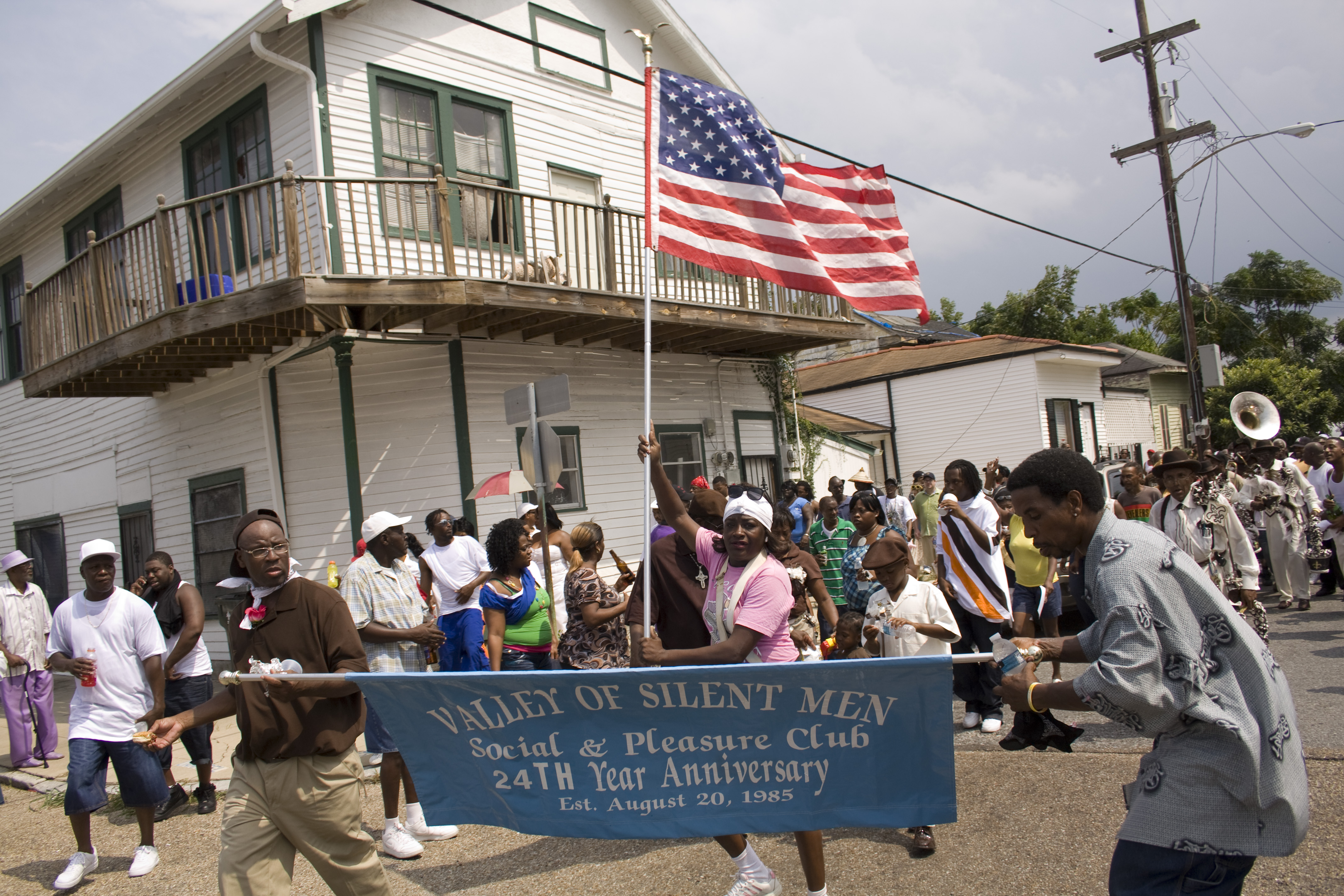
- Second line parade in Central City, 2009
- Nickname: Josephine
- Interactive map of Central City
- Coordinates: 29°56′29″N 90°05′13″W
- Country: United States
- State: Louisiana
- City: New Orleans
- Planning District: District 6, Central City

Area
  - Total: 1.41 sq mi (3.7 km^{2})
  - Land: 1.41 sq mi (3.7 km^{2})
  - Water: 0.00 sq mi (0 km^{2})
- Elevation: 0 ft (0 m)

Population (2010)
  - Total: 6,417
  - Density: 4,550/sq mi (1,760/km^{2})
- Time zone: UTC-6 (CST)
  - Summer (DST): UTC-5 (CDT)
- Area code: 504

Central City is a neighborhood of the city of New Orleans. It is located in the 11th Ward of New Orleans in Uptown, just above the Garden District, on the "lakeside" of St. Charles Avenue. A subdistrict of the Central City/Garden District Area, its boundaries as defined by the City Planning Commission are: MLK Boulevard, South Claiborne Avenue and the Pontchartrain Expressway to the north, Magazine, Thalia, Prytania and Felicity Streets and St. Charles Avenue to the south and Toledano Street, Louisiana Avenue and Washington Avenue to the west. This old predominantly African-American neighborhood has been important in the city's brass band and Mardi Gras Indian traditions.

== History ==
The area closest to Saint Charles Avenue developed first, in the first half of the 19th century, booming with the opening of the New Orleans & Carrollton Railway, which became the St. Charles Streetcar Line. The opening of the New Basin Canal at the neighborhood's lower end contributed to the area's development as a center of commerce and a working class residential area, attracting many Irish, Italian, and German immigrants. After the American Civil War many African Americans from rural areas settled in this part of the city. By the 1870s, the urbanized area extended back to Claiborne Avenue. Dryades Street in this area was a neighborhood commercial district by the 1830s.

In 1849 the public Dryades Market was built, and served as an anchor for almost 100 years. The commercial district thrived in the first half of the 20th century, becoming the city's largest commercial district patronized by African Americans during the Jim Crow law era and a major hub for the Uptown African American community, overtaking the older South Rampart Street area in importance. At its height in the years after World War II, the Dryades Street district boasted over 200 businesses, with businesses owned primarily by Jews and some African Americans.

The commercial portion of Dryades Street began a decline in the late 1960s, which became a steep nose-dive by the 1980s. At the low point somewhere around 1990, blighted and vacant buildings predominated. The blighted area got city attention, and the old commercial section of Dryades Street was renamed after local civil rights activist Oretha Castle Haley, who was one of the young college students who boycotted Dryades Street in 1960 (although black shoppers were welcomed, the businesses did not hire black cashiers or clerks) and participated in lunch counter desegregation demonstrations on Canal St. Projects to improve the neighborhood gradually saw fruit by the start of the 2000s.

A large part of Central City was above the flooding which devastated the majority of New Orleans in the aftermath of Hurricane Katrina in 2005 (see: Effect of Hurricane Katrina on New Orleans). As there were many vacant buildings and vacant lots in this rare piece of high dry ground, greater attention has been drawn to Central City in post-Katrina redevelopment of the city, including the redevelopment and updating of old public housing apartments built in the 1940s during segregation.

The Melph, Magnolia Projects, and Calliope Projects were located in Central City. Magnolia has been redeveloped and is now the mixed-income Harmony Oaks. Calliope has been partially redeveloped into the mixed-income Marrero Commons. Melpomene (known as the Guste apartments) includes a multi-story building for senior citizens, as well as newer townhouses and additional new replacement units under construction in 2015. Central City has a significant Civil Rights History. In addition to the boycott on Dryades Street, the Southern Christian Leadership Conference was founded with Martin Luther King Jr. in Central City in 1957. The New Orleans chapter of the Congress of Racial Equality was founded and located in Central City as well.

== Geography ==
Central City is located at 29°56′29″N 90°05′13″W and has an elevation of 0 feet (0.0 m). According to the United States Census Bureau, the district has a total area of 1.41 square miles (3.7 km^{2}). 1.41 square miles (3.7 km^{2}) of which is land and 0.00 square miles (0.0 km^{2}) (0.0%) of which is water.

It is located between the Louisiana Superdome and the Garden District.

=== Adjacent neighborhoods ===
- Gert Town (north)
- Central Business District (north)
- Lower Garden District (south)
- Garden District (south)
- Milan (west)
- Broadmoor (west)

== Demographics ==
As of the census of 2000, there were 19,072 people, 8,147 households, and 4,016 families residing in the neighborhood. The population density was 13,526 /mi^{2} (5,155 /km^{2}).

As of the census of 2010, there were 11,257 people, 5,279 households, and 2,142 families residing in the neighborhood.

== Crime ==
Central City was home to the civil rights movement in New Orleans in the 1960s, but fell into poverty, blight and crime in the late 1970s and into the 1980s and '90s. It was also one of the main areas affected by the crack epidemic in the mid 1980s The overall crime rate in Central City is 93% higher than the national average. For every 100,000 people, there are 15.16 daily crimes that occur in Central City. It is safer than 44% of the cities in Louisiana. There is a 1 in 19 chance of becoming a victim of any crime. However, the number of total year-over-year crimes in New Orleans has decreased by 7%. In 2014, Central City was ranked 2nd most dangerous neighborhood with 122 violent crimes in a three-month period. Several gangs have been known to operate out of Central City.

=== Boundaries ===
The New Orleans City Planning Commission defines the boundaries of Central City as these streets: MLK Boulevard, South Claiborne Avenue, Pontchartrain Expressway, Magazine Street, Thalia Street, Prytania Street, Felicity Street, St. Charles Avenue, Toledano Street, Louisiana Avenue and Washington Avenue.

== Landmarks ==
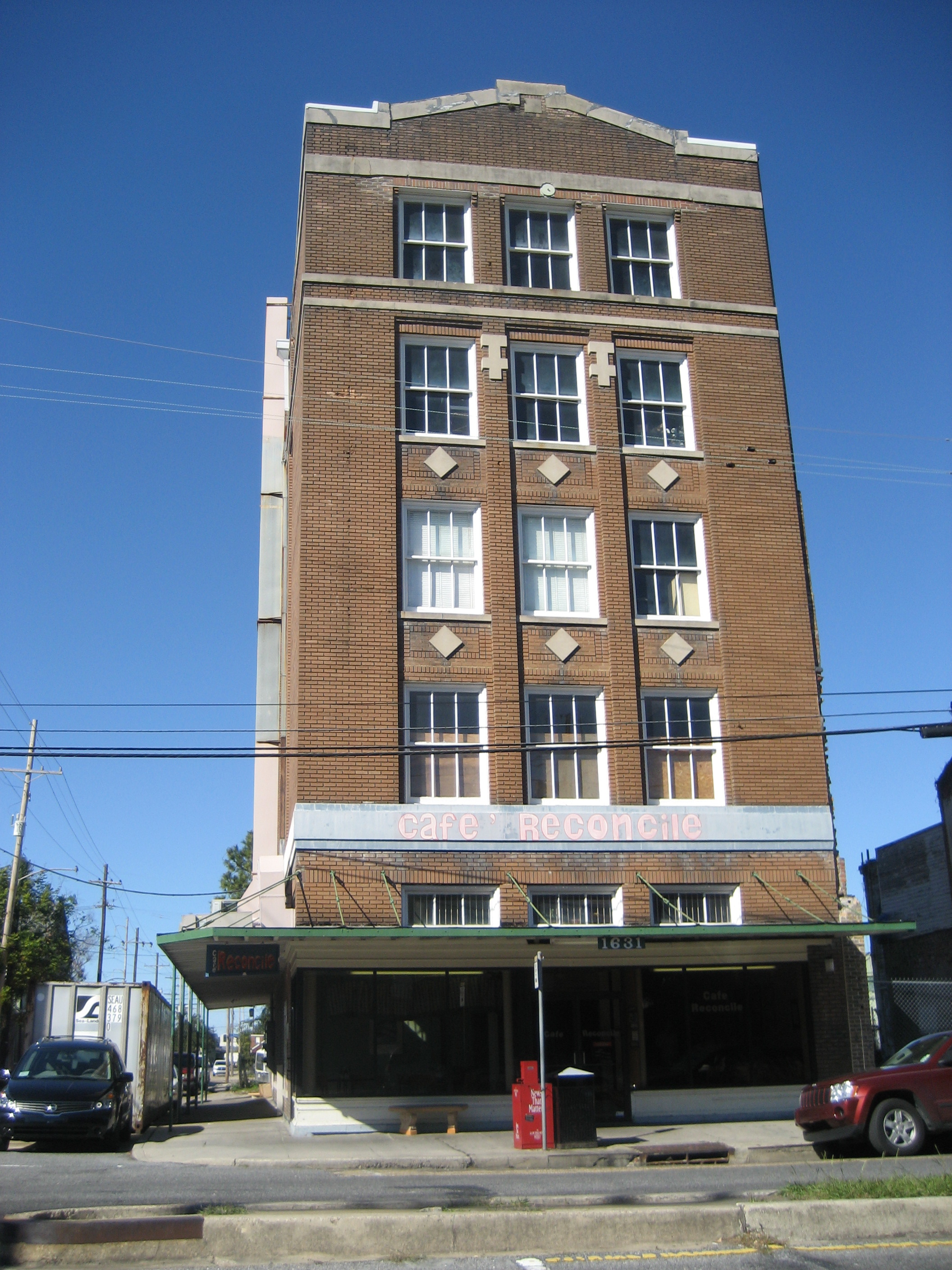
Café Reconcile on Oretha Castle Haley Boulevard.

Major streets include Baronne, Oretha Castle Haley Blvd., Martin Luther King Jr. Boulevard, and Simon Bolivar. Martin Luther King Jr. Boulevard is near a Martin Luther King statue and memorial on Claiborne Avenue, and the boulevard is part of the route of New Orleans's annual Martin Luther King Day parade. A memorial to Martin Luther King Jr. is on boulevard at the intersection of Oretha Castle Haley Boulevard. It is a bronze sculpture by the late Frank Hayden, and was commissioned by the city and unveiled in 1976.

Neighborhood businesses include Brown's Dairy and Leidenheimer Bakery, which have furnished the city with milk, ice cream and Louisiana French bread for po'boy sandwiches respectively for generations. The "Main Street" of Central City is Oretha Castle Haley Boulevard, formerly known as the Dryades Street commercial district for over 100 years. It is a nationally accredited Main Street, as well as a member of the Louisiana Main Streets Network, as well as a Louisiana Cultural District. Long-time anchors include the Ashe Cultural Arts Center and Cafe Reconcile. Other commercial borders and streets include St. Charles Ave., S. Claiborne Ave., and LaSalle/Simon Bolivar.

Central City is a designated National Register Historic District, and contains several individually landmarked buildings as well.

== Education ==
Orleans Parish School Board and the Recovery School District manage public schools, which are all charters.

The KIPP Central City Academy is located in the Carter G. Woodson Middle School building; the new Woodson building was dedicated in 2012. KIPP Central City Primary is also in Central City at the former Guste Elementary.

New Orleans College Prep was established in 2006. The original New Orleans College Prep school building is in Central City.

Central City also is home to the NET Charter High School, James Singleton Charter School and Edgar Harney Charter School.

The New Orleans Public Library operates the Central City Branch in the Mahalia Jackson Center.

== Notable residents ==
- Buddy Bolden, jazz pioneer
- Kid Ory, jazz pioneer
- Professor Longhair, songwriter, pianist
- Birdman, rapper
- Turk, rapper
- Juvenile, rapper
- Soulja Slim, rapper
- Master P, rapper
- Silkk The Shocker, rapper
- C-Murder, rapper

== See also ==
- New Orleans neighborhoods
