= Irish Channel, New Orleans =

Irish Channel Manche irlandaise Cuisle na hÉireann
- New Orleans neighborhood
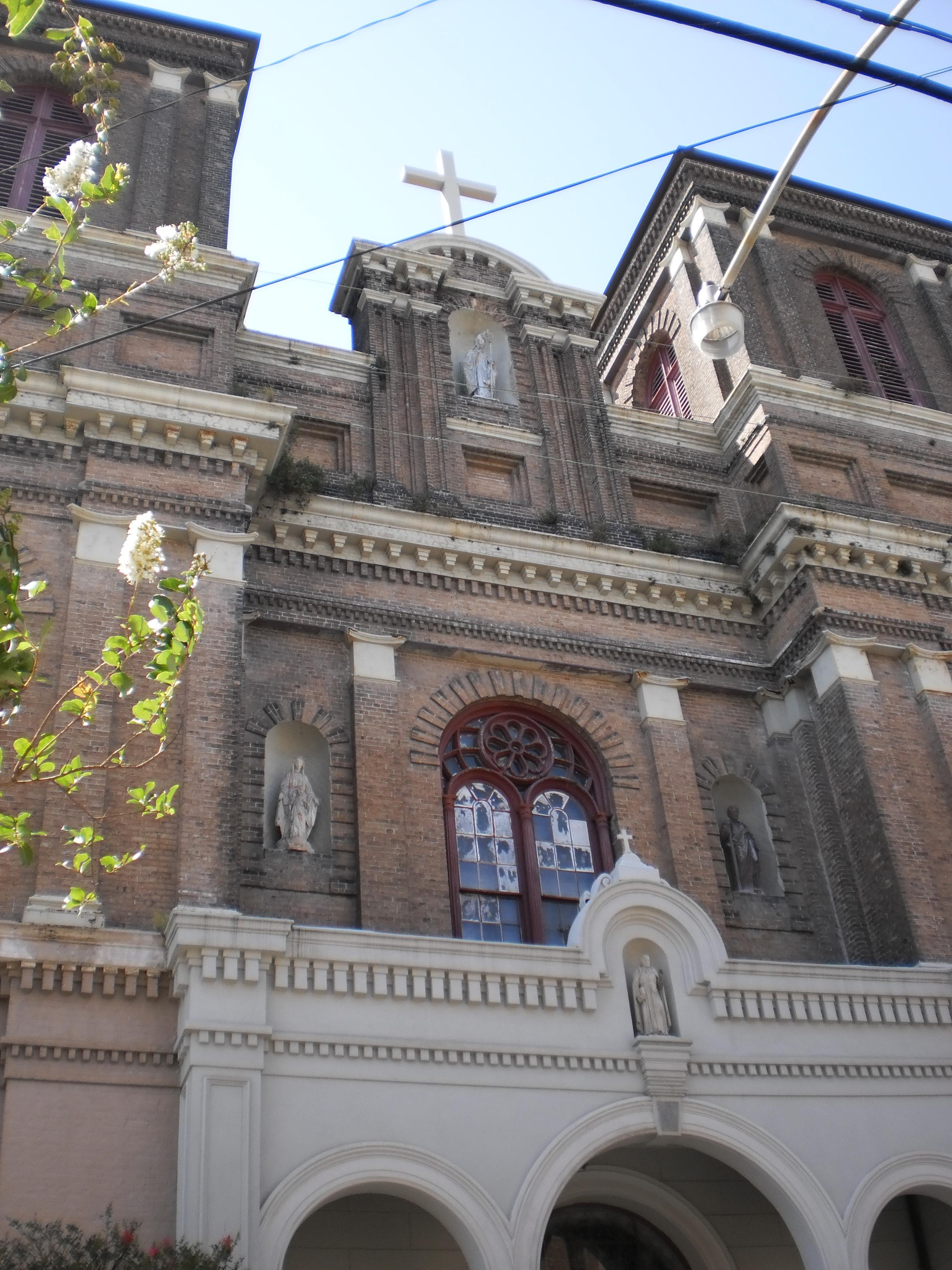
- St. Alphonsus Church on Constance Street in the original Irish Channel
- Interactive map of Irish Channel
- Coordinates: 29°55′23″N 90°04′55″W
- Country: United States
- State: Louisiana
- City: New Orleans
- Planning District: District 2, Central City/Garden District

Area
  - Total: 0.83 sq mi (2.1 km^{2})
  - Land: 0.50 sq mi (1.3 km^{2})
  - Water: 0.33 sq mi (0.85 km^{2})
- Elevation: 7 ft (2.1 m)

Population (2010)
  - Total: 1,907
  - Density: 3,800/sq mi (1,500/km^{2})
- Time zone: UTC-6 (CST)
  - Summer (DST): UTC-5 (CDT)
- Area code: 504

Irish Channel is a neighborhood of the city of New Orleans. It abuts the Garden District Area on the north side. Although the original site was located predominantly on the east side of Jackson Avenue, its boundaries as defined by the Historic District Landmarks Commission are: Magazine Street to the north, Jackson Avenue to the east, the Mississippi River to the south and Louisiana Avenue to the west.

== Geography ==
Irish Channel is located at 29°55′23″N 90°04′55″W and has an elevation of 7 feet (2.1 m). According to the United States Census Bureau, the district has a total area of 0.83 square miles (2.1 km^{2}). 0.50 square miles (1.3 km^{2}) of which is land and 0.33 square miles (0.9 km^{2}) (39.76%) of which is water.

=== Adjacent neighborhoods ===
- East Riverside (west)
- Garden District (north)
- Lower Garden District (east)
- Mississippi River (south)
- West Riverside (west)

=== Boundaries ===
The boundaries of the Irish Channel, originally part of the now incorporated Faubourg Lafayette were Tchoupitoulas Street and Magazine Street between Felicity Street and Phillip Street. The east boundary was later moved to Jackson street in the 1930s for the St. Thomas Development which was demolished in the late 1990’s. Most of the original location of the Irish Channel is now considered part of the Lower Garden District and the location of historic Irish Channel landmarks such as Adele Street, St. Andrews Street, St. Mary’s Cathedral, St. Alphonsus Church, along with a police station, Walmart, Boettner Park, and the River Garden development. In 2002, prior to Hurricane Katrina, the New Orleans City Planning Commission defined the boundaries of the Irish Channel as Tchoupitoulas Street, Toledano Street, Magazine Street, and First Street.

== History ==
The mostly working-class neighborhood was, as the name implies, originally settled largely by immigrants from Ireland in the early 19th century. However early on the area also had people of other ethnicities, including German, Italian, and African American, living nearby each other. The origin of the name is obscure. However, one school of thought says that the Irish "channeled" into the area, while another says that rain would settle into the streets of this predominately Irish neighborhood at the time.

Significant emigration from Ireland to the United States occurred during the period 1810 - 1850, with a particularly large wave to New Orleans during the decade of the 1830s. The point of debarkation was Adele Street, where many immigrants, penniless, took up residence in simple cottages (shotgun houses). These Irish immigrants arrived primarily to dig the New Basin Canal, and were generally regarded as expendable labor. Many of these immigrants were misled by shipping companies who led prospective immigrants to believe that New Orleans was close to other Irish enclaves in the United States such as New York City, Philadelphia, and Boston. These Irish immigrants were predominantly Roman Catholic, in contrast to the Protestant Scots-Irish that were more common as immigrants to most of the rest of the Southeastern United States. In addition to the Irish Channel, many Irish immigrants also settled at Irish Bayou, in present-day Eastern New Orleans. Irish immigrants found New Orleans a better cultural match than most Southeastern areas of the United States due to the large predominant Roman Catholic European population already there.

At the time of early immigration to the Irish Channel, this area was outside of the incorporated city of New Orleans, and the area was known as Lafayette, being formally annexed into New Orleans in 1852 as the 10th Ward. Irish ethnicity dominated despite the multi-ethnicity of the area. Adele Street was the center of activity in the early days of the Irish Channel. St. Alphonsus Church, constructed in 1855 by the Redemptorist Fathers, served the religious and cultural needs of this Irish immigrant population for many years. In 1874, a painting of Our Lady of Perpetual Help was brought to St. Alphonsus and a National Shrine established. For generations Irish school children as well as parishioners and visitors would participate in novenas to Our Lady at St. Alphonsus church. These services were so well attended that the city placed additional street cars in service to carry the large number of attendees. In these early years, churches were built to serve various other ethnic groups. St. Mary's Assumption Church served the German immigrant population of the Irish Channel, while Notre Dame de Bon Secours Church served the French immigrants.

The Irish Channel developed a reputation for ruffians early in its history, a reputation that slowly eroded. Much of this centered on conflicts between ethnic groups, eventually congealing as gangs, such as the St. Mary's Market Gang, the Shot Tower Gang, the Pine Knot Gang, the Ripsaw Gang, and the Crowbar Gang. The river front area was home to petty thieves and prostitutes, although much of the gang activity of the time centered on the corner of St. Mary Street and Religious Street.

Through the early 20th century much of the population worked in the port of New Orleans before modern shipping innovations greatly reduced the need for stevedores and similar jobs. There were also local breweries in the area. This had significant economic consequences, with the resulting poverty persisting today.

Since about the 1960s, the neighborhood has been majority African American, with substantial minorities of the descendants of the 19th century immigrants and more recent Latino immigrants. Parades and parties are held on and around St. Patrick's Day which are enjoyed by many locals whether they are of Irish ancestry or not. Examples of organizations that parade on St. Patrick's Day and promote other civic activities are the Irish Channel St. Patrick's Day Club and the Irish Channel Corner Club. The local chapter of the Ancient Order of Hibernians also promotes Irish Channel heritage. Parasol's Bar and Tracey's Bar, a block apart on Third Street, are a focal point for St. Patrick's Day parades in the Irish Channel.

The area is known for much surviving working class and middle class 19th century residential architecture, including many shotgun houses. The neighborhood included the former St. Thomas Development, now part of the River Garden community.

Built on the city's old high ground, the neighborhood escaped the catastrophic flooding of most of the city in the aftermath of Hurricane Katrina in 2005 (see: Effect of Hurricane Katrina on New Orleans).

== Demographics ==
As of the census of 2000, there were 4,270 people, 1,750 households, and 904 families residing in the neighborhood. The population density was 8,540 /mi² (3,285 /km^{2}).

As of the census of 2010, there were 3,373 people, 1,665 households, and 649 families residing in the neighborhood.

== Landmarks ==
A historically working-class neighborhood of New Orleans, the Irish Channel is home to a number of notable landmarks, including:

- 2219 Rousseau St., the former home of the short-lived city of Lafayette's jail and courthouse. Built in 1834 in the Egyptian Revival architectural style.

== Education ==
=== Public schools ===
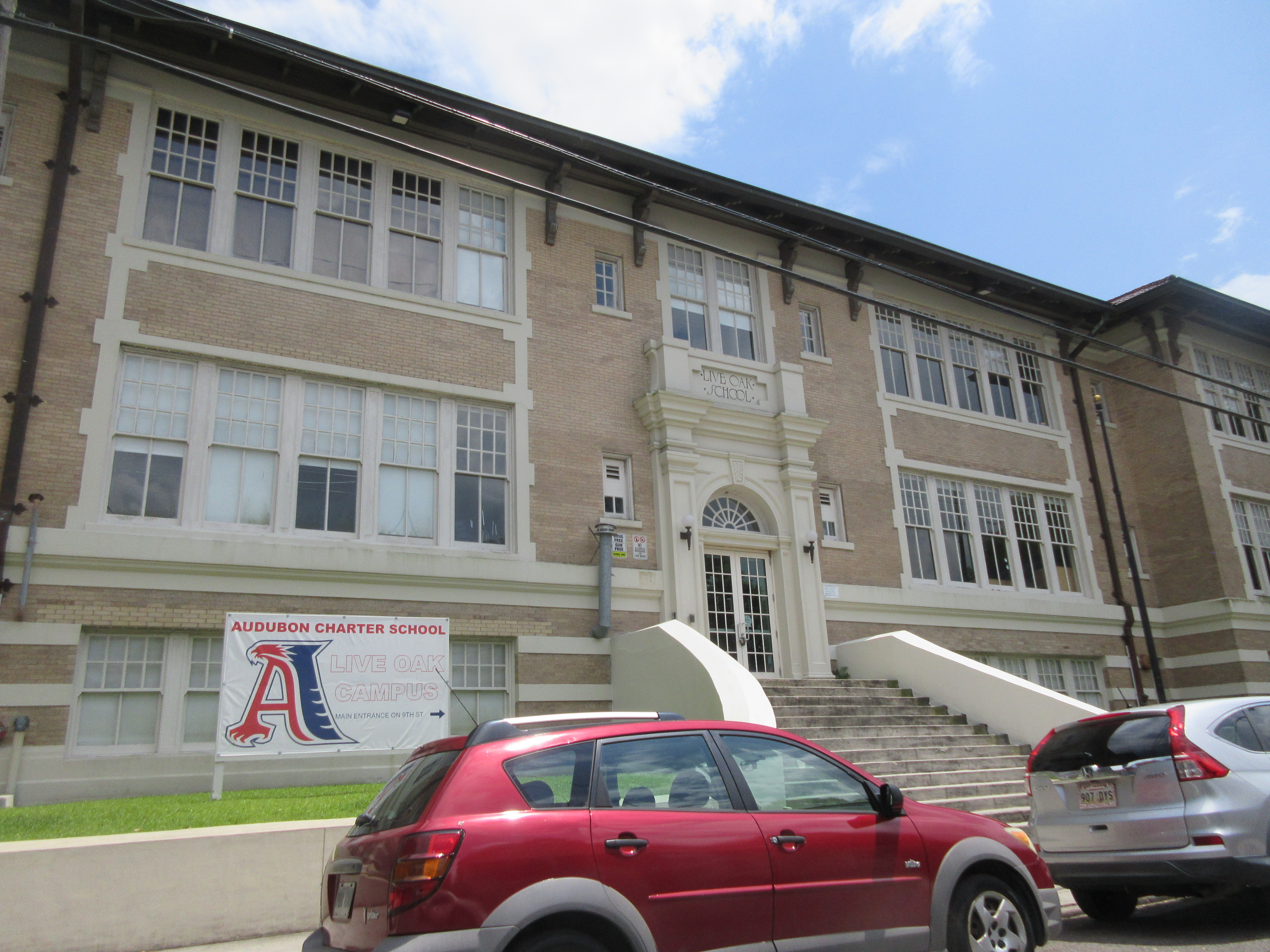
Live Oak School

The Irish Channel is zoned to schools in the New Orleans Public Schools (NOPS) and the Recovery School District (RSD).

The Batiste Cultural Arts Academy is a K-8 charter school operated by the charter management organization ReNEW Schools that is located in the former Live Oak Elementary School Building in the Irish Channel. As of 2012 it has over 600 students. In 2012 the President's Committee on the Arts and the Humanities stated that the school was one of eight that would participate in the Turnaround Arts program.

After Hurricane Katrina, Live Oak was a school directly operated by the RSD. In 2009 about 75% of the fourth graders at the Live Oak Elementary School failed the LEAP test. In 2010 the school had a performance score of "40" which was below the "65" that was the level considered "academically unacceptable." Cindy Chang of The Times-Picayune said former Live Oak Elementary School was performing so poorly that Paul Vallas, the superintendent of the RSD, gave the school to the ReNEW charter management school group, which specialized in taking control of poor performing schools. ReNEW repurposed the school into Batiste Academy. Gary Robichaux, the executive director of ReNEW, had full control over the school's hiring and firing, and he kept 15% of the previous teaching staff and brought younger teachers to replace them.

=== Schools ===
The Audubon Charter School Upper Campus is located in the Irish Channel.

=== Miscellaneous education ===
The Japanese Weekend School of New Orleans (ニューオリンズ日本語補習校 Nyū Orinzu Nihongo Hoshūkō), a Weekend Japanese school program, holds its classes at the Waldorf School.

== Notable people ==
Many early jazz musicians including Tom Brown, the Brunies brothers, Nick LaRocca, and Tony Sbarbaro lived in the Irish Channel. Prizefighter John L. Sullivan trained in the Irish Channel, since much prizefighting centered in New Orleans in the late 19th century.

"Anti" O'Rourke was a show man who earned his living as a diver, often diving from steamboats on the Mississippi River. He originated the jack-knife dive, which he termed the "Anti Dive".

Francis Xavier Seelos was a Bavaria-born Redemptorist priest who served those stricken by yellow fever in the Irish Channel in 1866/67 and died of the disease. He was declared "blessed" by Pope John Paul II and his feast day is celebrated on October 5.

Eleanor McMain was a social activist in the Irish Channel in the early part of the twentieth century, leading Kingsley House to become a center for progressive movements.

Paul Sanchez, singer-songwriter and founding member of Cowboy Mouth, grew up in the Irish Channel.

Anne Rice, author of "Interview with a Vampire", grew up in the Irish Channel.

== See also ==
- Neighborhoods in New Orleans
