= San Bartolome Church =

San Bartolome Church may refer to:

- San Bartolome Church (Magalang), Philippines
- San Bartolome Church (Malabon), Philippines
