= Irish Channel =

Irish Channel can refer to:

- Irish Channel, New Orleans, a neighborhood of New Orleans, Louisiana, United States
- A channel north of Deer Island, New Brunswick
- A former name for the North Channel (Great Britain and Ireland), an entrance to the Irish Sea between Northern Ireland and Scotland
