= ReNEW Schools =

Charter school management in Louisiana

ReNEW Schools is a charter school management organization in New Orleans, United States. Its headquarters are in the Batiste Cultural Arts Academy school facility, in the former Live Oak Elementary School in the Irish Channel neighborhood. ReNEW is a charter management organization that specializes in acquiring low performing schools.

Around 2009 Live Oak Elementary School was performing so poorly that Paul Vallas, the head of the Recovery School District (RSD), gave the school to the ReNEW.

In 2019, the ReNEW staff announced to their staff via e-mail that they would be closing both McDonough City Park Academy and ReNEW Cultural Arts Academy. It is anticipated that Firstline Schools, a competing charter group, will be granted a charter for a school at the Cultural Arts Academy location.

== Schools ==
- ReNEW SciTech Academy (former Laurel Elementary School) - Lower Garden District
- Schaumburg Elementary School (beginning in the 2013–2014 school year) - East New Orleans
- Dolores T. Aaron Academy (formerly Reed/Little Woods Elementary)- East New Orleans

Closed

- ReNEW Cultural Arts Academy (former Live Oak Elementary School) - Irish Channel (Closed in 2018)
- ReNEW Accelerated High School (former Agnes Baudit Elementary School) (Closed in 2019)
- McDonogh City Park Academy - Mid-City (Closed in 2018)
- ReNEW Early Childhood Center at McNair Formerly KiPP Believe! (Closed in 2019)
