= New Canal Light =

Lighthouse in Louisiana, US

New Canal Lighthouse
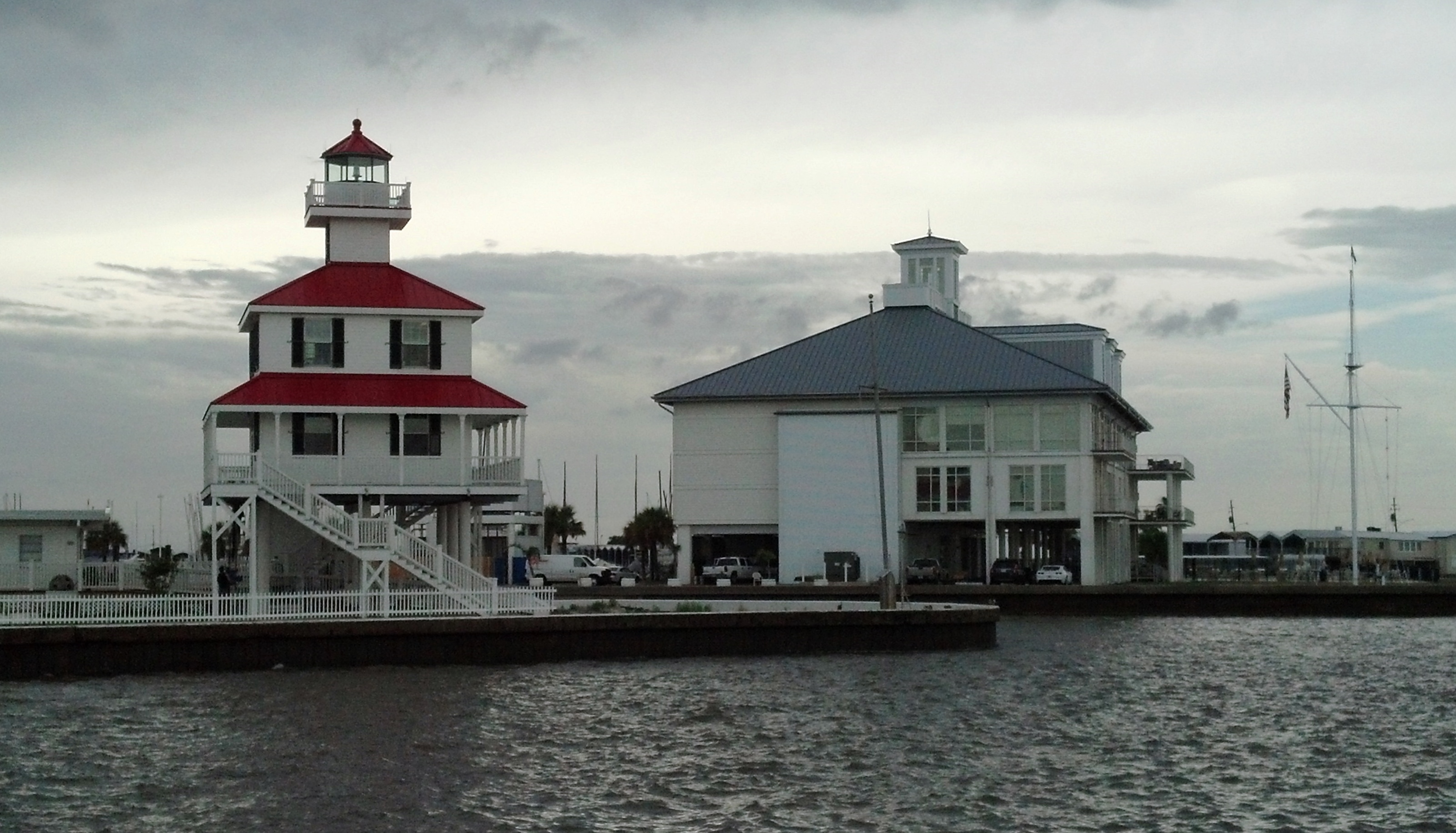
- New Basin Canal entrance at Lake Pontchartrain
- Location: West End Blvd. and Lakeshore Dr., New Orleans, Louisiana
- Coordinates: 30°1′37.6″N 90°6′47.55″W

Tower
- Constructed: 1838
- Foundation: Pile with platform
- Construction: Wood
- Automated: Yes
- Height: 10 m (33 ft)
- Shape: Square tower on top of house
- Markings: White with red roof
- Heritage: National Register of Historic Places listed place
- Fog signal: Previous: Bell, every ten seconds

Light
- First lit: 1890 (last lighthouse)
- Focal height: Lighthouse: 49 feet (15 m); Current pole light: 15 feet (4.6 m)
- Lens: 5th order Fresnel lens
- Characteristic: Lighthouse: Occulting White 5s Current pole light: Fl 2 White 5s
- New Canal Lighthouse
- Formerly listed on the U.S. National Register of Historic Places
- Built: 1890
- Architect: New Orleans Canal and Banking Co.
- NRHP reference No.: 85003186

Significant dates
- Added to NRHP: December 30, 1985
- Removed from NRHP: July 13, 2011

The New Canal Light or (more commonly New Canal Lighthouse or New Basin Canal Lighthouse) was first established in 1838 at the north end of the New Basin Canal which ran from Lake Pontchartrain to the Uptown or "American" section of the city which today is known as the New Orleans Central Business District. The canal was filled in about 1950, but the lighthouse remained on a jetty extending into the lake on a half mile long stretch of the canal that was left and is still used as a small boat and yachting harbor.

== History ==
The original lighthouse was built in 1838 on a foundation of sheet piling filled in with shells. The tower was octagonal, built of cypress, about 28 feet (8.5 m) high. The tower deteriorated badly and was replaced in 1855 with a square wood dwelling on screw piles with an iron lantern and a 5th order Fresnel lens. In 1890 the structure was again replaced, with the light being raised to 49 feet (15 m). The 1890 structure was substantially rebuilt in 1901. It was damaged by hurricanes in 1903, 1915, 1926, and 1927. It was moved to its current location in 1910. After the 1927 damage it was raised on new concrete piers and in 1936, the breakwater surrounding it was filled in, putting land under the structure for the first time. From the 1960s through 2001 there was a USCG station at the site.

The lighthouse was heavily damaged during the 2005 hurricane season by Hurricanes Katrina and Rita. The first floor had collapsed and its cupola had fallen off. In 2006, the Lake Pontchartrain Basin Foundation signed a lease with the United States Coast Guard to repair the damaged lighthouse. It was disassembled and the building was put into storage. Reconstruction of the lighthouse began in February 2012 and was completed in 2013 by Certified Construction Professional of New Orleans, LA..

The lighthouse was added to the National Register of Historic Places in 1985 as the New Canal Lighthouse.

It is now operated as the New Canal Lighthouse Museum and Education Center by the Pontchartrain Conservancy (formerly the Lake Pontchartrain Basin Foundation). The museum's exhibits include the history of the lighthouse, the environment and ecology of the Pontchartrain Basin, a Fresnel lens that was believed to have been in the lighthouse in the early 1900s, the work of the Conservancy, and area history and recreation.

== Gallery ==
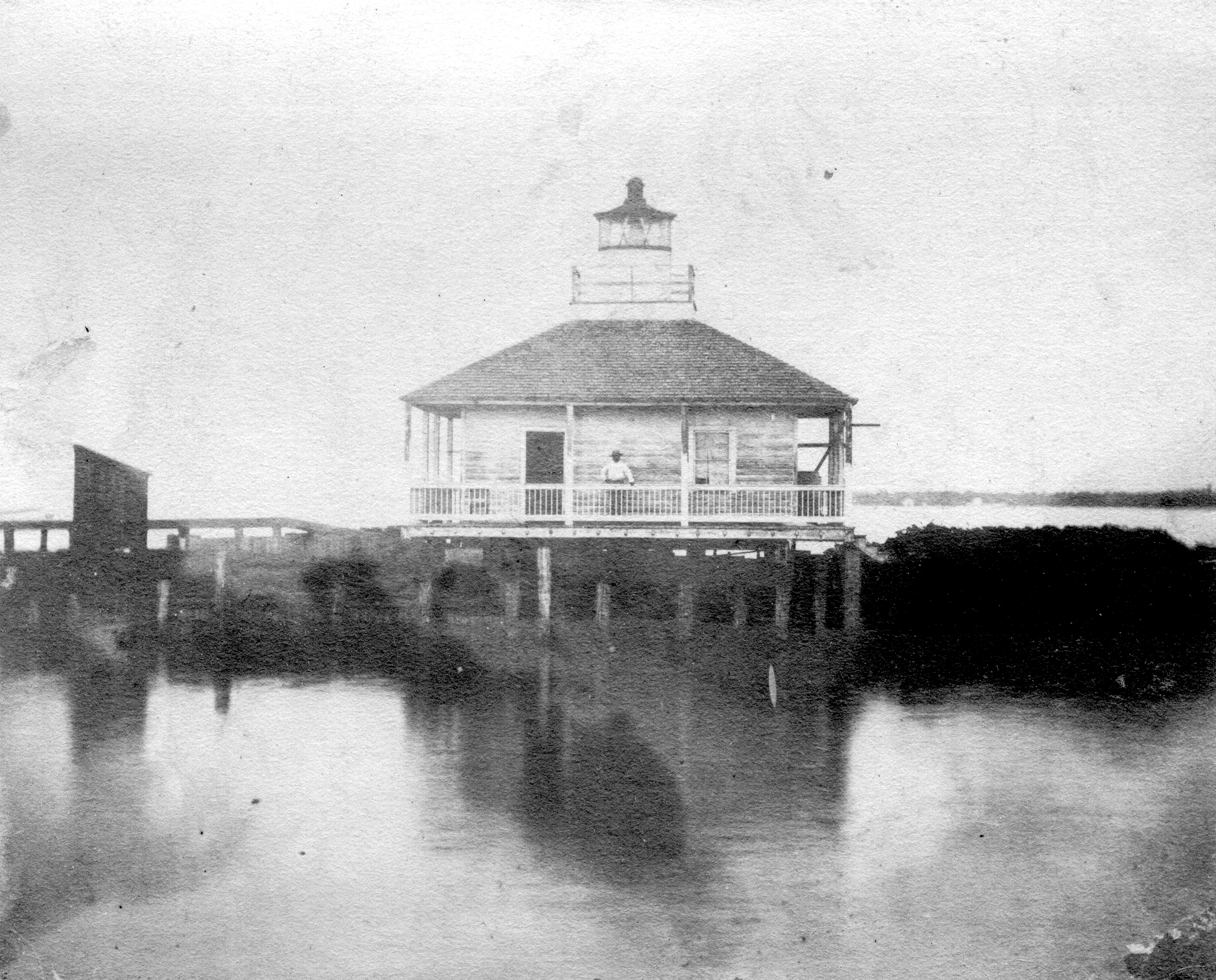
The 1855 Lighthouse

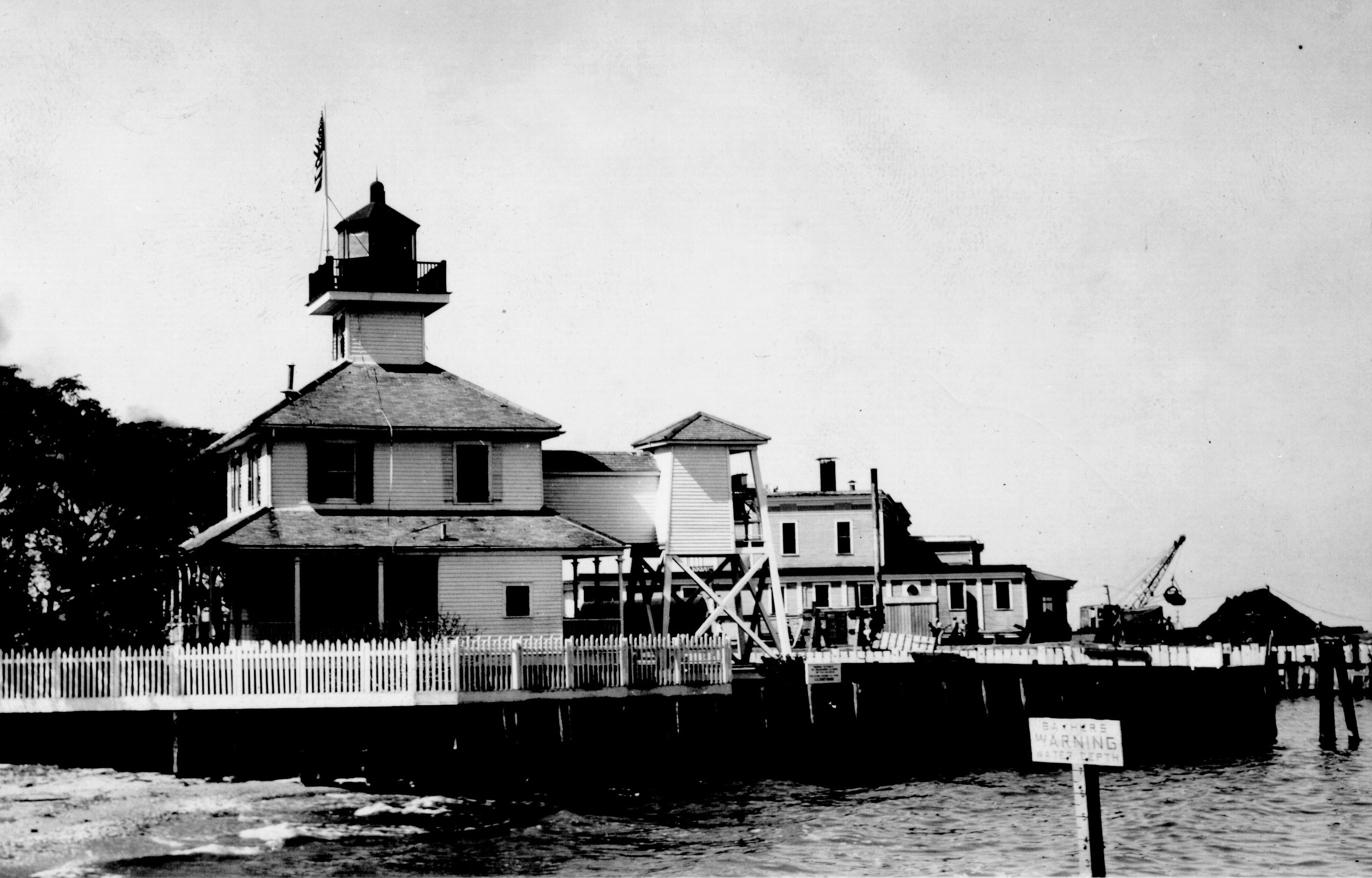
The 1890/1901 Lighthouse

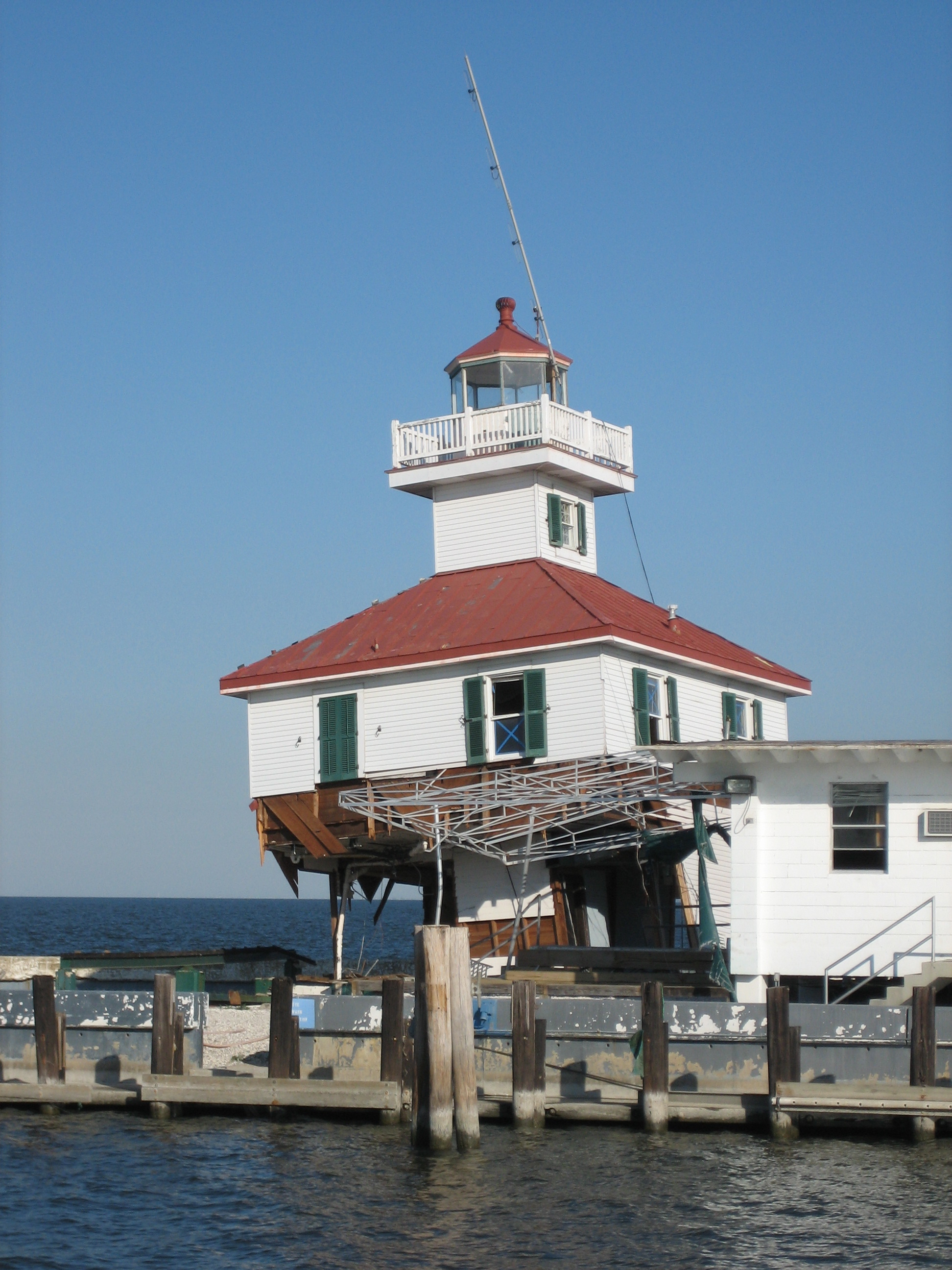
Damage after Hurricanes Katrina and Rita - 2005

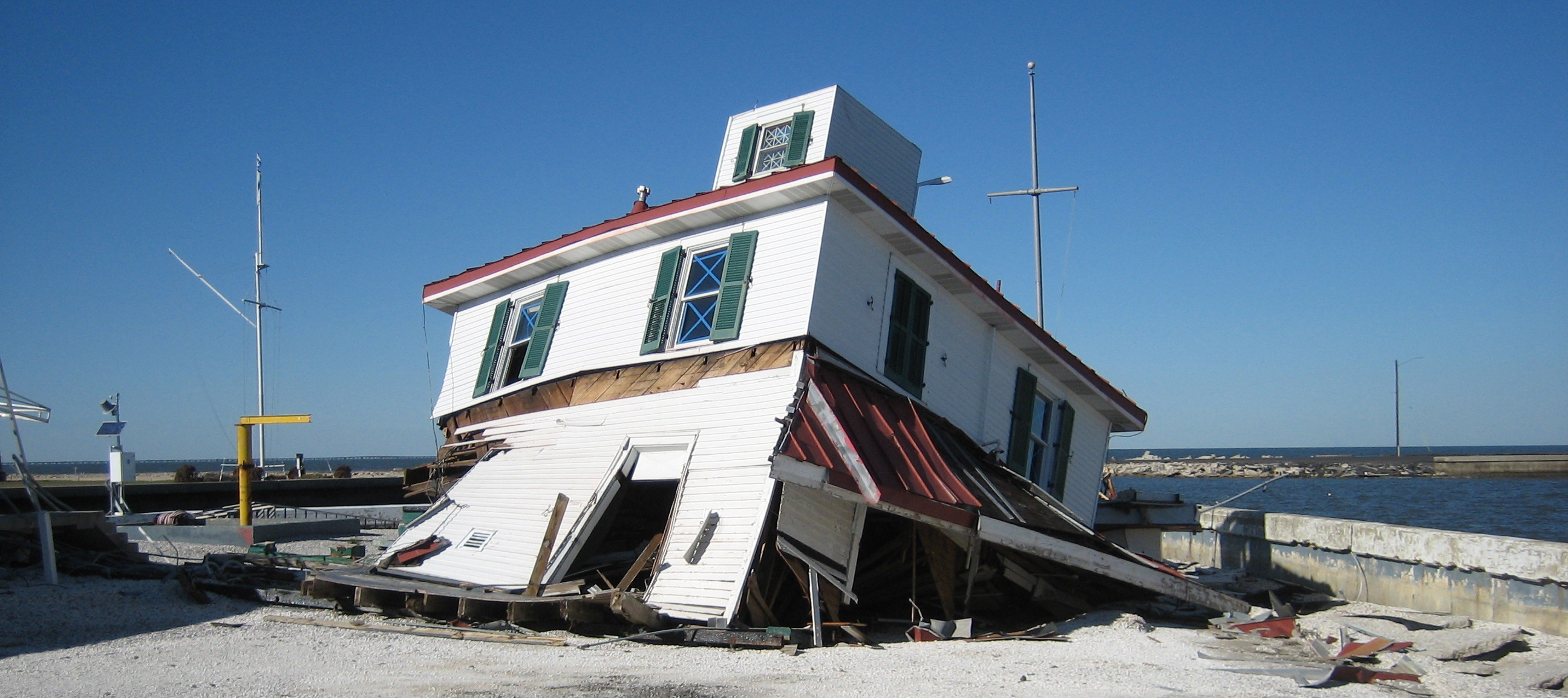
Collapse after Hurricanes Katrina and Rita - 2005

== See also ==
- List of lighthouses in the United States
- New Basin Canal
- West End, New Orleans
