= Lower Garden District, New Orleans =

Lower Garden District
- New Orleans neighborhood
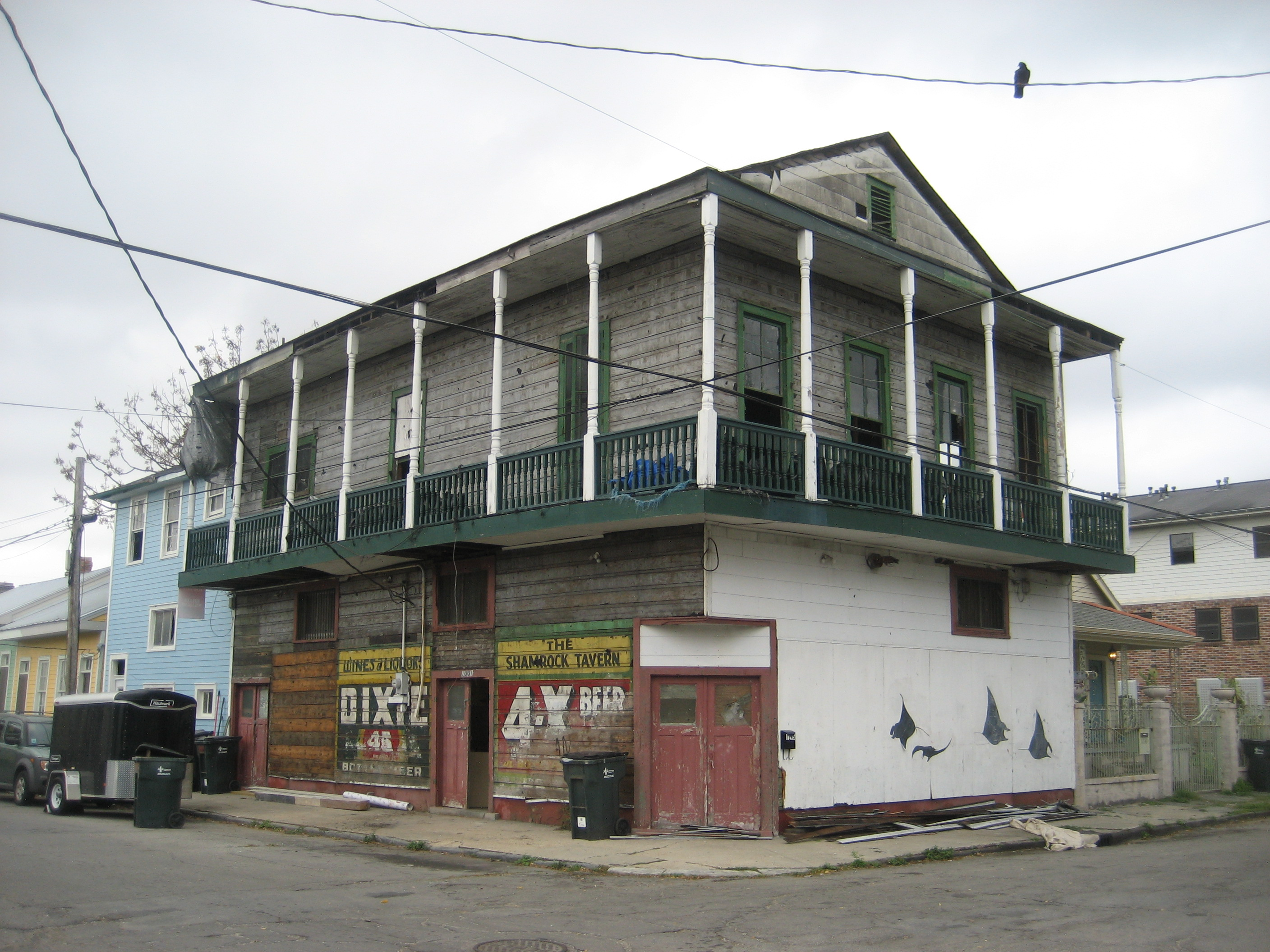
- Building formerly housing a neighborhood bar, Lower Garden District
- Interactive map of Lower Garden District
- Coordinates: 29°56′02″N 90°04′12″W
- Country: United States
- State: Louisiana
- City: New Orleans
- Planning District: District 2, Central City/Garden District

Area
  - Total: 1.16 sq mi (3.0 km^{2})
  - Land: 0.95 sq mi (2.5 km^{2})
  - Water: 0.21 sq mi (0.54 km^{2})
- Elevation: 6 ft (1.8 m)

Population (2010)
  - Total: 4,542
  - Density: 4,800/sq mi (1,800/km^{2})
- Time zone: UTC-6 (CST)
  - Summer (DST): UTC-5 (CDT)
- Area code: 504

Lower Garden District is a neighborhood of the city of New Orleans. A subdistrict of the Central City/Garden District Area, its boundaries as defined by the New Orleans City Planning Commission are: St. Charles Avenue, Felicity, Prytania, Thalia, Magazine, and Julia Streets to the north; the New Orleans Morial Convention Center, Crescent City Connection, and Mississippi River to the east; Felicity Street, Magazine Street, Constance Street, Jackson Avenue, Chippewa Street, Soraparu Street, and St. Thomas Street to the south; and 1st Street to the west.

== Geography ==
Lower Garden District is located at 29°56′02″N 90°04′12″W and has an elevation of 6 feet (1.8 m). According to the United States Census Bureau, the district has a total area of 1.16 square miles (3.0 km^{2}), 0.95 square miles (2.5 km^{2}) of which is land and 0.21 square miles (0.5 km^{2}) (18.1%) of which is water.

It includes the Papillon Apartments, an apartment complex operated by Tulane University for graduate students and their families.

=== Adjacent neighborhoods ===
- Central Business District (north)
- Mississippi River (east)
- St. Thomas Development (south)
- Irish Channel (west)
- Garden District (west)
- Central City (west)

=== Boundaries ===
The New Orleans City Planning Commission defines the various boundaries of the Lower Garden District with these streets: St. Charles Avenue, Prytania Street, Felicity Street, Thalia Street, Magazine Street, Julia Street, the New Orleans Morial Convention Center, Crescent City Connection, Mississippi River, Constance Street, Jackson Avenue, Chippewa Street, Soraparu Street, St. Thomas Street, and First Street.

== Landmarks ==
The Lower Garden District is home to a number of historical landmarks, including St. Alphonsus Church.

The Pikachu sculpture

In 2016, the Pikachu, also known as the Pokemonument, a fiberglass sculpture depicting the Pokémon species of the same name by 2 local artists whose identity was not revealed until years later, was installed in Lower Garden District.

The 5-foot (1.5 m) statue of the Japanese icon was erected as an apparent tribute to Pokémon Go on July 31, 2016, in a decommissioned fountain along Terpsichore Street, near Coliseum Square in New Orleans' Lower Garden District. The fiberglass sculpture was coated to look like bronze. The artist wrote '#pokemonument' in concrete near the work's base.

Within a few days, the sculpture was vandalized by someone with a baseball bat. It was repaired. Some two weeks after its placement, the "Pokemonument" was removed, and an online statement from the artist said that the artwork would be auctioned to benefit restoration of the park's fountains. The work sold for $2,000.

== Demographics ==
As of the census of 2000, there were 6,116 people, 3,332 households, and 998 families residing in the neighborhood. The population density was 6,438 /mi^{2} (2,446 /km^{2}).

As of the census of 2010, there were 6,363 people, 3,843 households, and 994 families residing in the neighborhood.

== Education ==
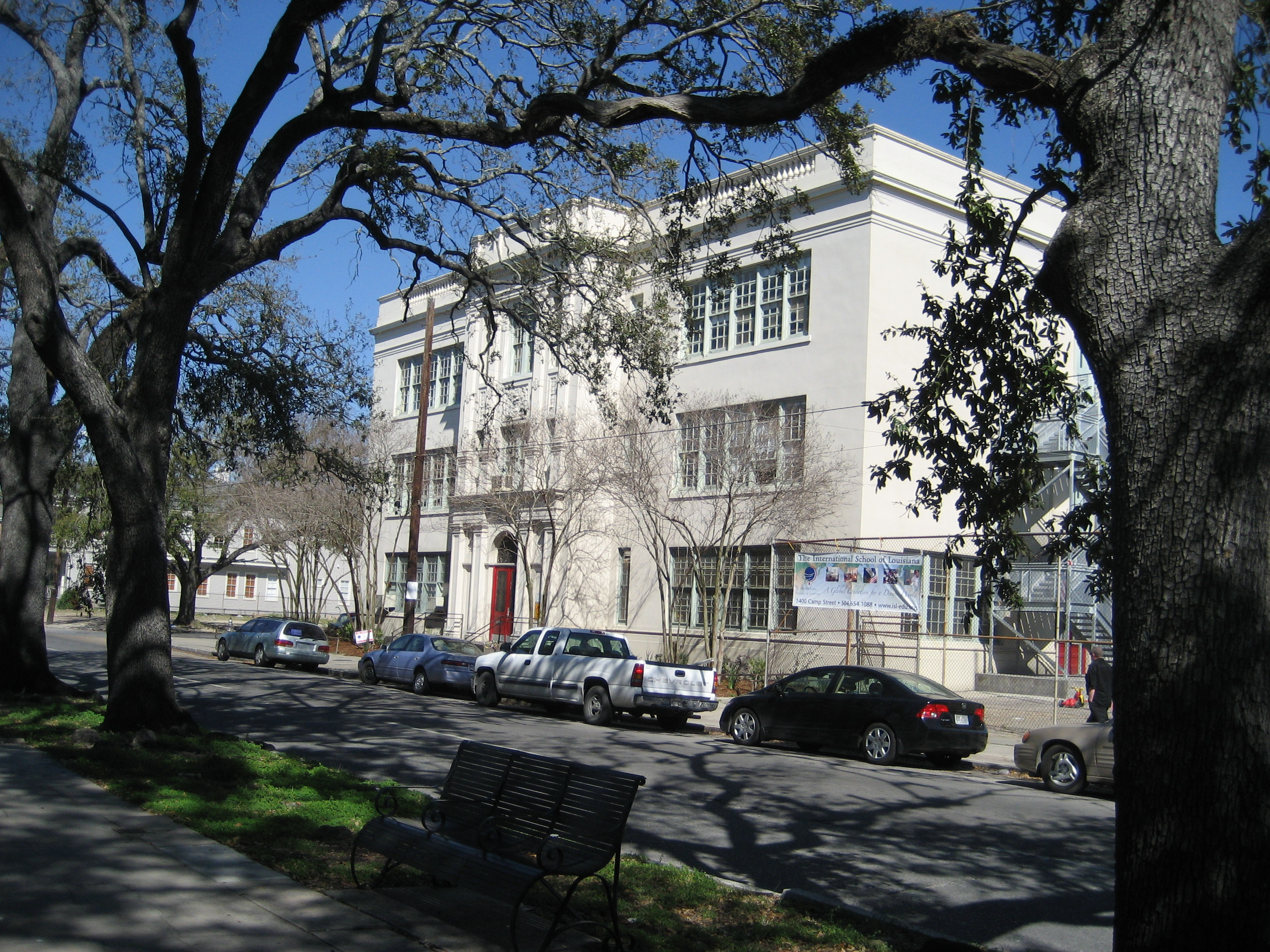
Andrew Jackson School in 2007

The Garden District is zoned to schools in the New Orleans Public Schools and the Recovery School District.

ReNEW SciTech Academy, operated by ReNEW Schools, is within the former Laurel Elementary School within the Lower Garden District. After Hurricane Katrina, Laurel was a school directly operated by the RSD. In 2010 Laurel had a performance score of 45, below the "65" score that was considered "academically unacceptable."

The International School of Louisiana (New Orleans International School), one of the two schools in New Orleans that is chartered by the State of Louisiana but is not a part of the RSD, operates the Camp Street Campus, located in the former Andrew Jackson Elementary School in the lower Garden District. This campus opened in 2000. The Center for Education Reform in 2007 ranked the International School as one of the best charters in the United States.

== Notable residents ==
- Mike Williams, singer for Eyehategod, used to live in the Lower Garden District until his house was burned down.
- Jennifer Coolidge, actress who appeared in the American Pie film series and Legally Blonde.

== See also ==
- Neighborhoods in New Orleans
