= Irish Channel Corner Club =

New Orleans Mardi Gras krewe

The 'Irish Channel Corner Club is the second oldest marching club in New Orleans, La. organized in 1918. It is an all-male carnival organization that marches in parades during Mardi Gras, in which they don colorful custom carnival costumes and specifically design Corner Club beads, and St. Patrick's Day, in which they wear their traditional green vests. Their members walk with canes that have colorful flowers that are given away for kisses while they dance and drink in the streets.

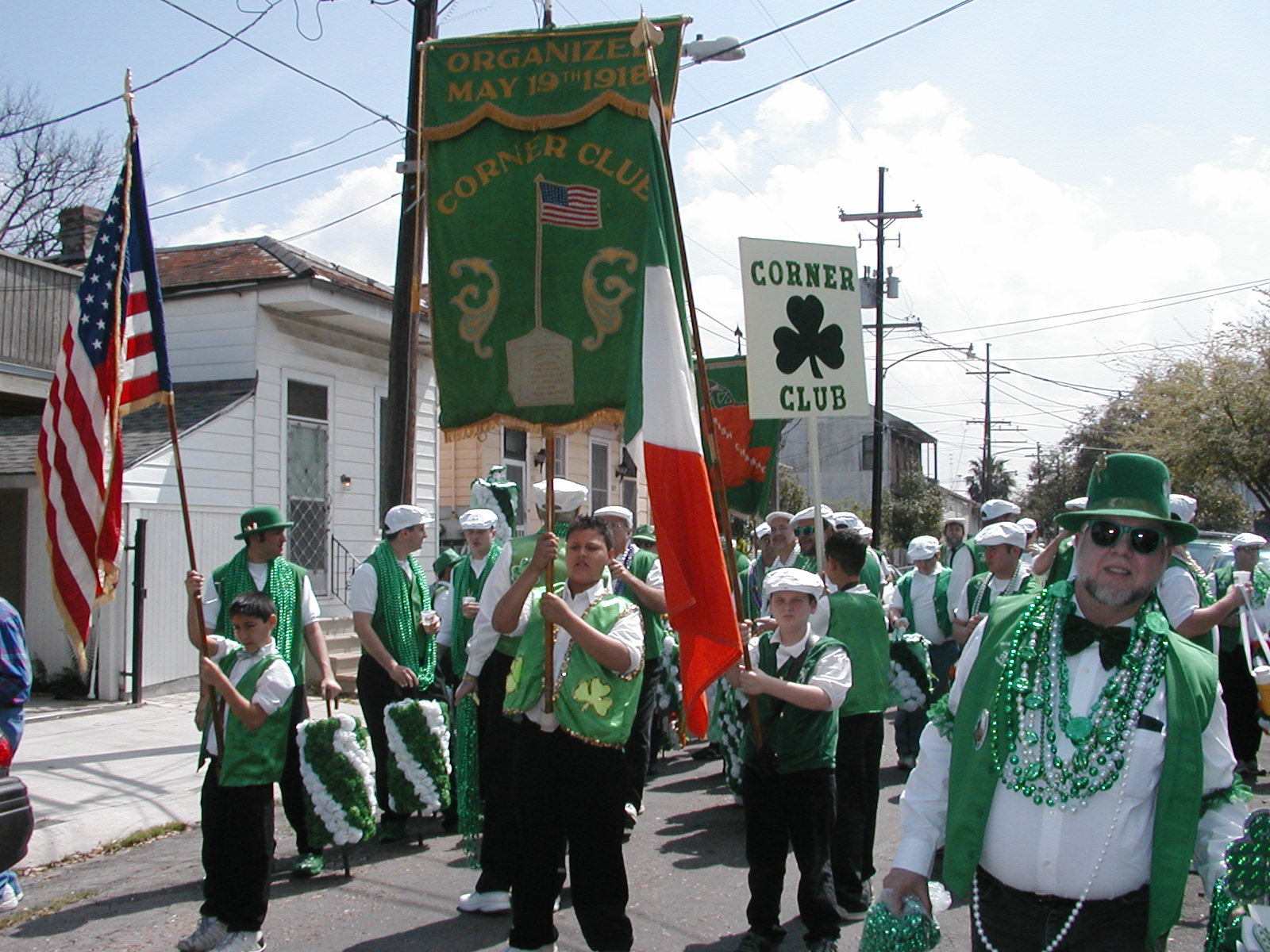
Parading in 2003

The Irish Channel Corner Club was organized May 1918 by a group of seven men on the corner of Third and Rousseau Streets, named after the historic Irish Channel neighborhood of the city. With the help of the neighborhood the club became one of the finest in the city until the year of 1932 when the club disbanded because of the Great Depression. After World War II, On April 6, 1947, five men decided to reorganize the club, and again with the help of the neighborhood, the club was returned to an active status and marches every Carnival Day.

The club currently parades on Mardi Gras Day through the Irish Channel, Uptown, and down St. Charles Avenue with The Pauline Bros. Brass band, who has been walking with the club since 1949. They also parade in the Thoth Parade the Sunday before Mardi Gras Day.

In honor of St. Patrick's Day the club parades in the Irish Channel St.Patrick's Day Parade. In recent years the club has been joined by the FDNY Emerald Society Pipes and Drums, and local parading jazz bands including the Pocket Aces and the Big Fun Brass Band.
