= Irish Channel St. Patrick's Day Club =

The Irish Channel St. Patrick's Day Club was formed in 1947 in the Irish Channel (New Orleans, Louisiana). The current president is Richard (Dick) Burke, Jr.

== Fundraisers ==
The Irish Channel St. Patrick's Club has done activities, such as block parties, to help fundraise for different charities such as the Special Olympics; the Chrones Benefit Golf Tournament for Chrones Research; The Chefs' Charity of St. Michael's Special School; distribution of Thanksgiving food baskets and active support of The Friends of St. Alphonsus.

== The Practice March ==
Every year, the club has a "Practice March" a few days before their parade. They usually walk from location to location (usually bars). Only members may participate in The Practice March.

== Parade ==
The Irish Channel St. Patrick's Day Parade is held the Saturday before St. Patrick's Day. There is a pre-parade mass at a Catholic church; for the past few years the mass has been at St. Mary's Catholic Church. To march in the Irish Channel St. Patrick's Day Club parade, membership is required. Suitable regalia includes the commemorative medallion and a tuxedo. The members are known to give out flowers from their flower cane and they also give out beads, especially pearl beads.

The Irish Channel St. Patrick's Day Parade starts at Magazine Street and Felicity Street, than goes down Jackson Ave., than goes down St. Charles Ave. and turns onto Louisiana Ave., then goes onto Magazine St. This route centers on the Irish Channel district of New Orleans.

== Block Party ==
The Block Party is held at Annunciation Square Playground, usually on St. Patrick's Day (March 17). The Block Party benefits St. Michael's Special School.

== Resources ==
- March Celebrations
- Irish, Italians, Indians roll this weekend
- St. Patrick's Day and St. Joseph's Day "Kissing Canes"
- Terrytown man chosen Irish club's grand marshal
