= Francis Xavier Seelos =

German-American Catholic priest and missionary

Blessed Francis Xavier Seelos C.Ss.R.
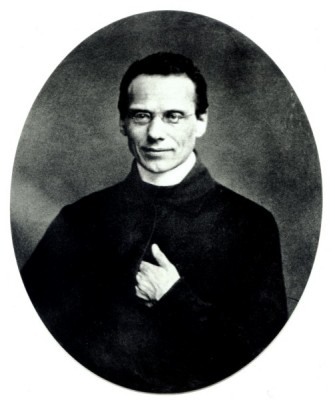

Religious, priest and missionary
- Born: January 11, 1819; Füssen, Kingdom of Bavaria, German Confederation
- Died: October 4, 1867 (aged 48); New Orleans, Louisiana, United States
- Venerated in: Catholic Church (United States & Redemptorists)
- Beatified: April 9, 2000, Vatican City, by Pope John Paul II
- Major shrine: National Shrine of Blessed Francis Xavier Seelos, St. Mary's Assumption Church, New Orleans, Louisiana, United States
- Feast: October 5

Francis Xavier Seelos, C.Ss.R. (January 11, 1819 – October 4, 1867) was a German Redemptorist missionary who worked in the United States, particularly in parishes serving immigrant communities on the American frontier. Near the end of his life, he travelled to New Orleans to minister to people affected by a yellow fever outbreak. He later contracted the disease and died from its complications.

== Early life ==
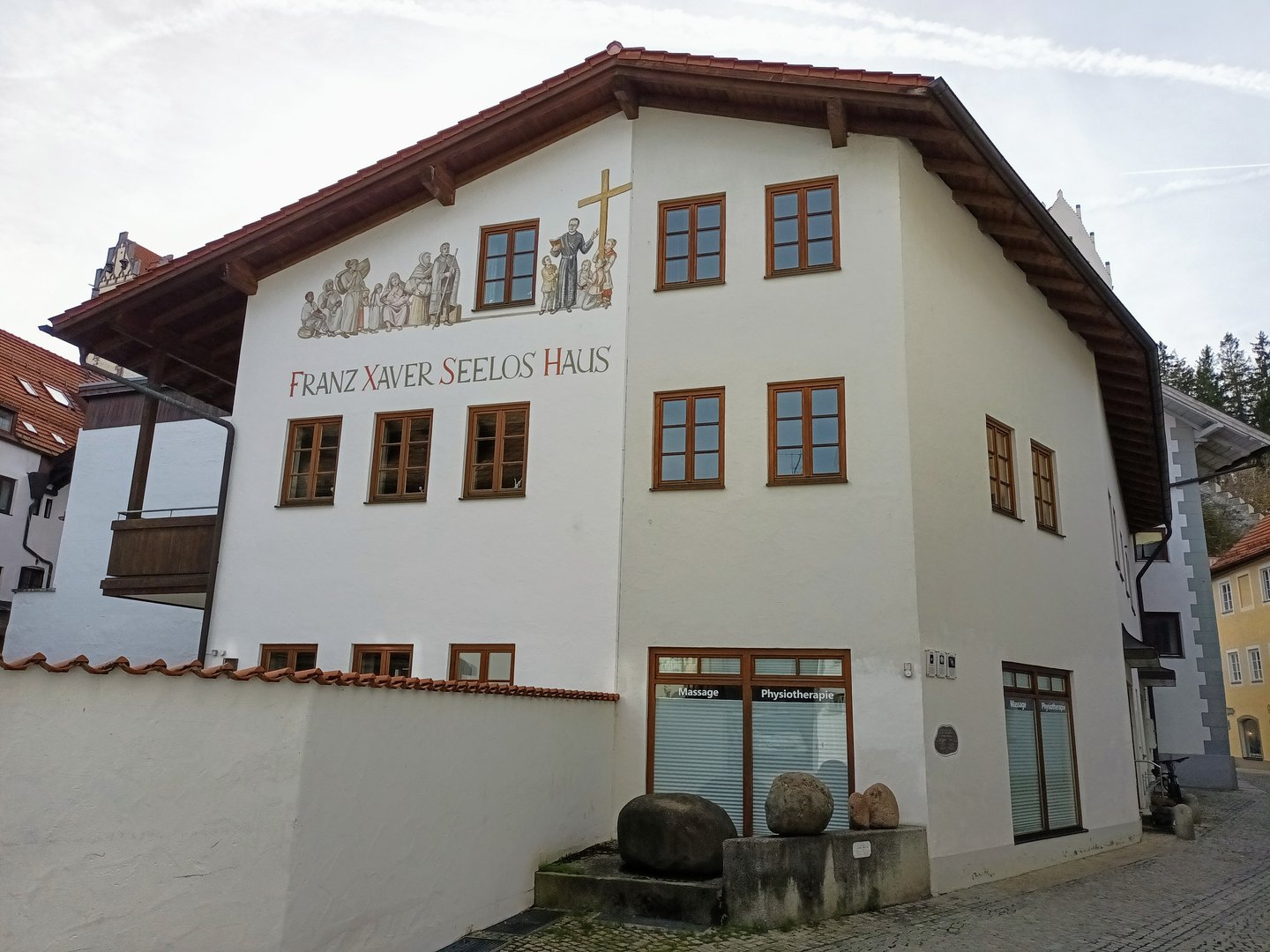
Seelos home, Füssen, Germany

Francis Seelos was born in Füssen in the Kingdom of Bavaria (present-day Germany) on January 11, 1819. He was one of 12 children born to Mang Seelos and Franziska Schwarzenbach. Francis was baptized that same day at St. Mang Church in Fussen.He battled sickness throughout his childhood. However, Seelos in 1825 was still able to enter primary school at age five in Füssen.He received his confirmation in 1828. He enjoyed playing priest with his friends and later became an altar server at the parish church.

In 1832, Seelos entered middle school at the Institute of Saint Stephen in Augsburg in Bavaria. He joined the Greater Latin Marian Confraternity in 1837, a group dedicated to the Virgin Mary. Receiving his diploma in 1839, he went on to the Ludwig-Maximilians-Universität München in Munich, Bavaria, where he completed his philosophy studies. Having expressed a desire for the priesthood since childhood, he entered the school of theology at the university In September 1842, with the goal of entering the priesthood.

While in seminary, Seelos was inspired by the letters published in the Catholic newspaper Sion, from the Redemptorist missionaries in the United States. They described the need for German-speaking priests to minister to the thousands of Catholic Germans who had immigrated to that country. He then visited the Redemptorist education institution in the village of Altötting in Bavaria to talk about missionary work.

== Joining the Redemptorists ==
After speaking with the Redemptorists, Seelos applied to join the order. He was accepted in November 1842 and assigned to complete his studies for the priesthood in the United States. Leaving the diocesan seminary, Seelos traveled to the port of Le Havre, France. His ship sailed from France on March 17, 1843, arriving in New York City on April 20th. Seelos then traveled to the Redemptorist center in Baltimore, Maryland.

On December 22, 1844, after having completed his novitiate and theological studies, Seelos took his vows as a Redemptorist. During the ceremony, he made this pledge to the Virgin Mary

“I promise not only to love, to serve, and to venerate you myself, but to do all in my power to cause others to love and venerate you.”

Seelos was ordained a priest on December 22, 1844, in St. James Church in Baltimore, Maryland.

== American missions ==
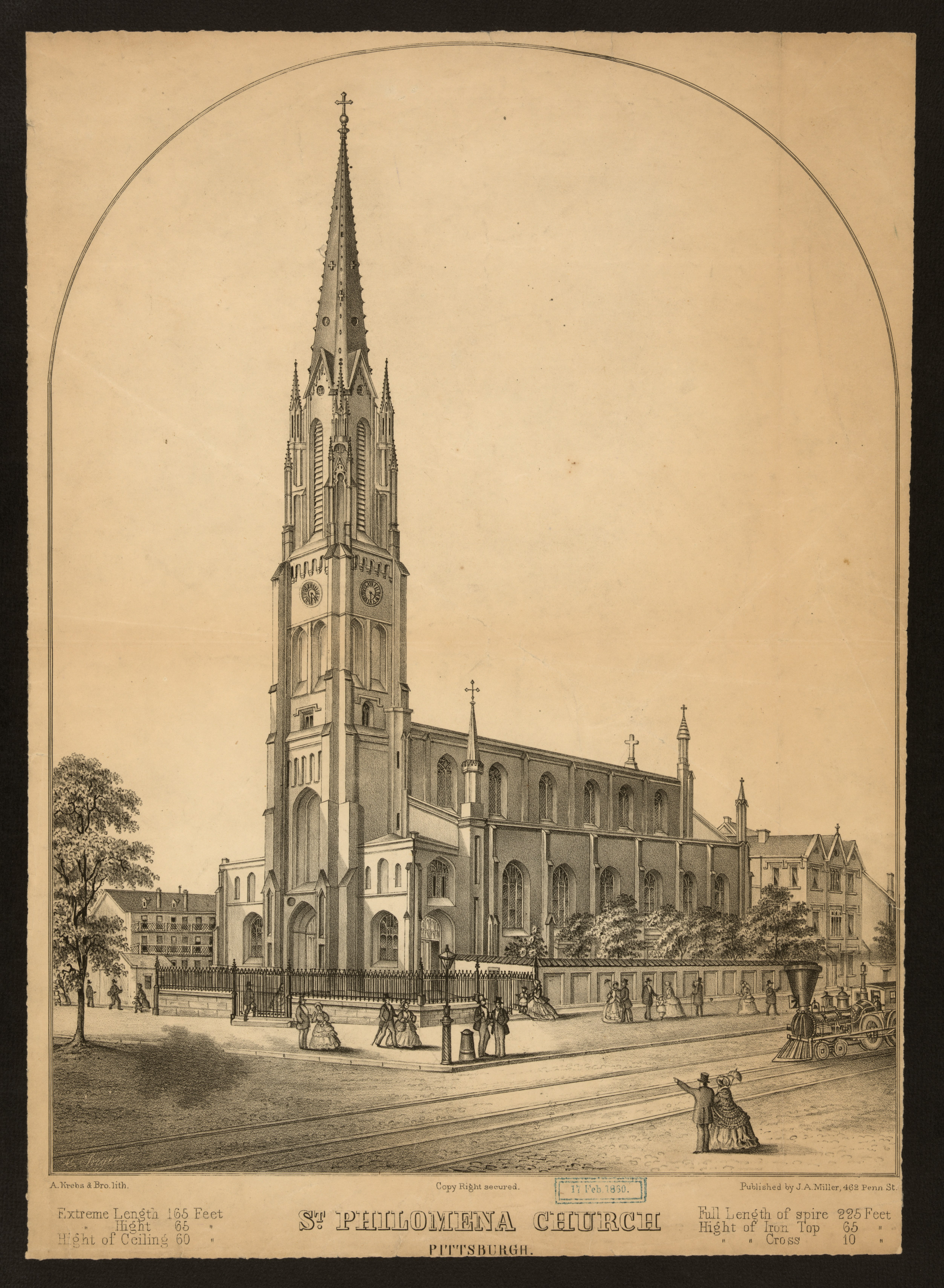
St. Philomena Church, Pittsburgh, Pennsylvania (1859)

=== 1845 to 1850 ===
In 1846, Neumann sent Seelos to serve at St. Vincent's Parish in Youngstown, Ohio. The next year, the Redemptorists assigned him as novice master at St. Philomena Parish in Pittsburgh, Pennsylvania. He served under the pastor John Neumann, who was also the superior of the Redemptorist community in Pittsburgh.

Seelos was later named superior, novice master for the Redemptorists and pastor of St. Philomena. He also dedicated himself to preaching missions. Regarding his relationship with Neumann, Seelos said: "He has introduced me to the active life" and "he has guided me as a spiritual director and confessor."A significant part of Seelos pastoral work at St. Philomena involved religious instruction to children. He regarded that as important to parish life and the development of Christian community.

Seelos was described as, "...a tall, slender, dignified man, with a kind, open, innocent face." Although born in Bavaria, he spoke English elegantly and fluently.He soon gained a reputation for kindness and understanding. His qualities as a confessor and spiritual direction drew in many Catholics from outside the parish. Seelos remarked at one point, "I hear confessions in German, English, French, of Whites, and of Blacks."

Seelos practiced a simple lifestyle and had a simple manner of expressing himself. His preaching themes, rich in Biblical content, were understandable to people of all educational levels. Seelos was described as a man with a constant smile and a generous heart, especially towards the needy and the marginalized.

=== 1850 to 1860 ===
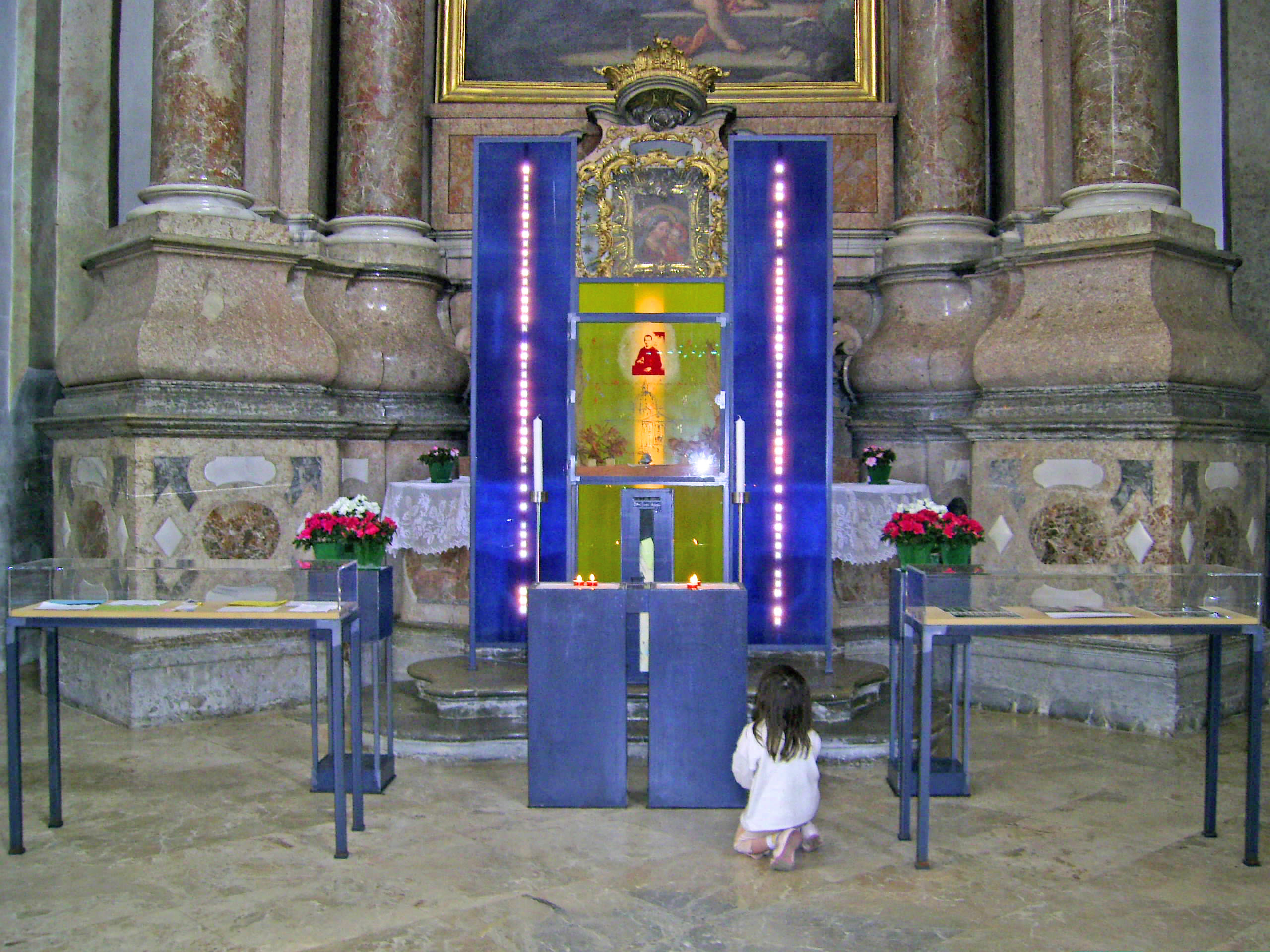
Shrine of Blessed Francis Xavier Seelos, St Magnus Basilica, Füssen

Seelos became an American citizen in 1852.In 1854, the Redemptorists assigned Seelos to serve as pastor of St. Alphonsus Parish in Baltimore. He was responsible for running a system of parish schools with 1,300 students. One day in early 1857, as he was exiting a confessional, he started spitting up large quantities of blood. Diagnosed with a hemorrhage, Seelos spent for weeks in the hospital. In a letter to his sister in Bavaria, he stated,

You can see from this how fortunate I feel in this sickness, and how I truly consider it as one of the greatest gifts of grace from the Lord.”

After Seelos recovered from his hemorrhage, the Redemptorists in April 1857 transferred him to serve as pastor and prefect of students at Sts. Peter and Paul Church in Cumberland, Maryland. He was grateful for the move as Sts. Peter and Paul was a less stressful environment.

=== 1860 to 1867 ===
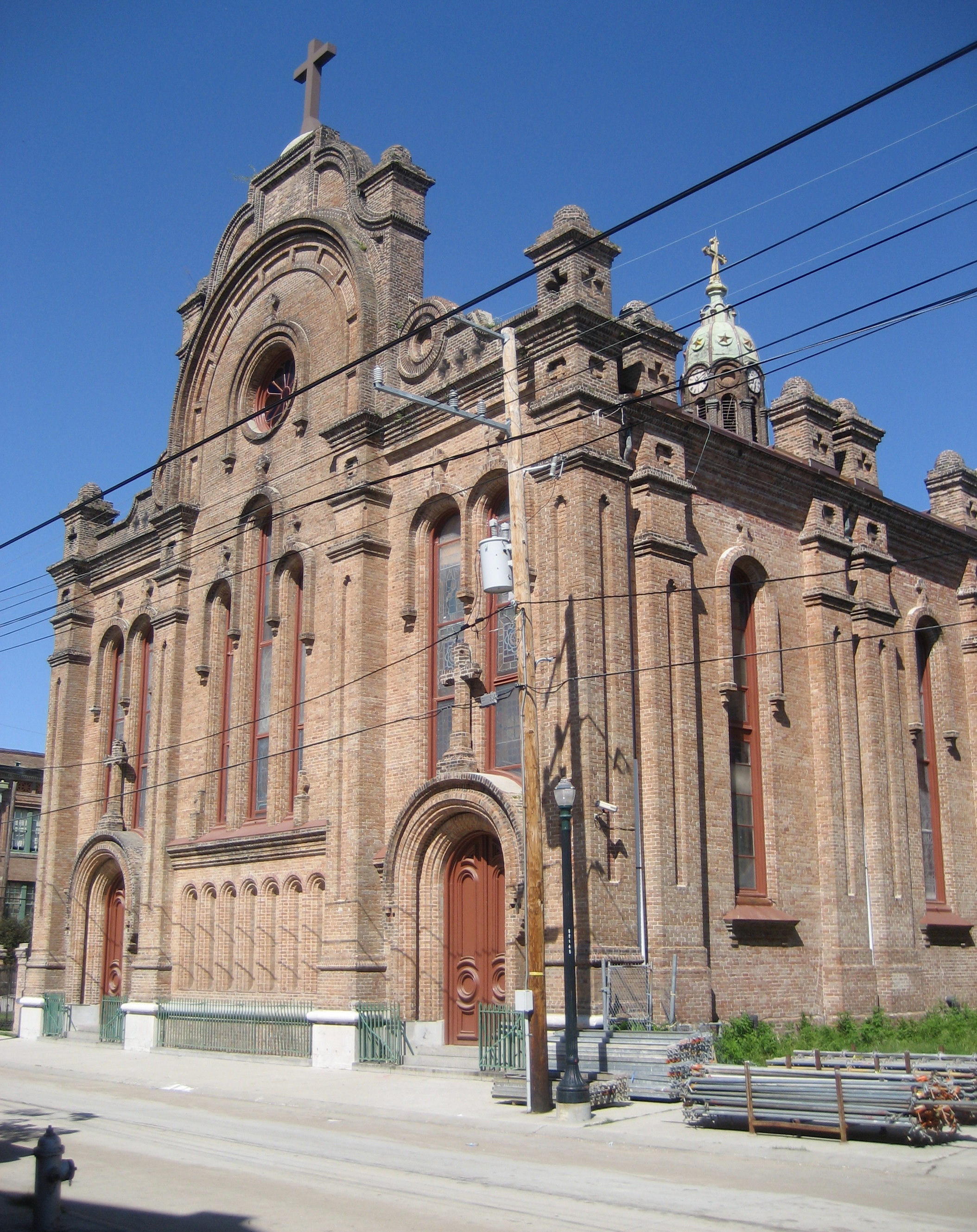
St. Mary of the Assumption Church, New Orleans

In 1860 Michael O'Connor, the outgoing bishop of Philadelphia, recommended to Pope Pius IX that he name Seelos as his replacement. Seelos quickly wrote to the pope, stating that he was totally unqualified for the position

The Redemptorists in 1862 moved Seelos to St. Mary's Parish in Annapolis, Maryland, to serve as superior, pastor and novice master. . As prefect, he was responsible for the supervision and formation of seminarians preparing for missionary work, with an emphasis on doctrinal instruction and pastoral service.At this time, the American Civil War was in progress. Seelos met on one occasion with US President Abraham Lincoln to exempt seminary students from military conscription. An official exemption was never created, but the US Army avoided drafting the seminarians.

In 1863, the Redemptorists allowed Seelos to become an itinerant preachers. During the next two years, he preached at numerous Catholic churches in the Northeastern United States and the American Midwest. In 1865, he preached for two weeks at St. Mary of Victories Church in St. Louis, Missouri. The church has a small shrine to his honor, a first-class relic, and one of the five known death masks of Seelos.

Later in 1865, the Redemptorists assigned him for a year at Mary's Parish in Detroit, Michigan. The Redemptorists in 1866 assigned him as pastor of St. Mary of the Assumption Parish in New Orleans, Louisiana. Due to the climate and the diseases in the area, Louisiana was considered a dangerous assignment in the order. While traveling by train to New Orleans, he began conversing with a sister of Notre Dame. She asked about his plans in the city; Seelos replied that he would contract yellow fever and die after a year there.

=== Death ===
Exhausted from caring for yellow fever victims in New Orleans, Seelos contracted the disease in September 1867. Francis Seelos died on October 4, 1867, in New Orleans at age 48.

== Veneration ==
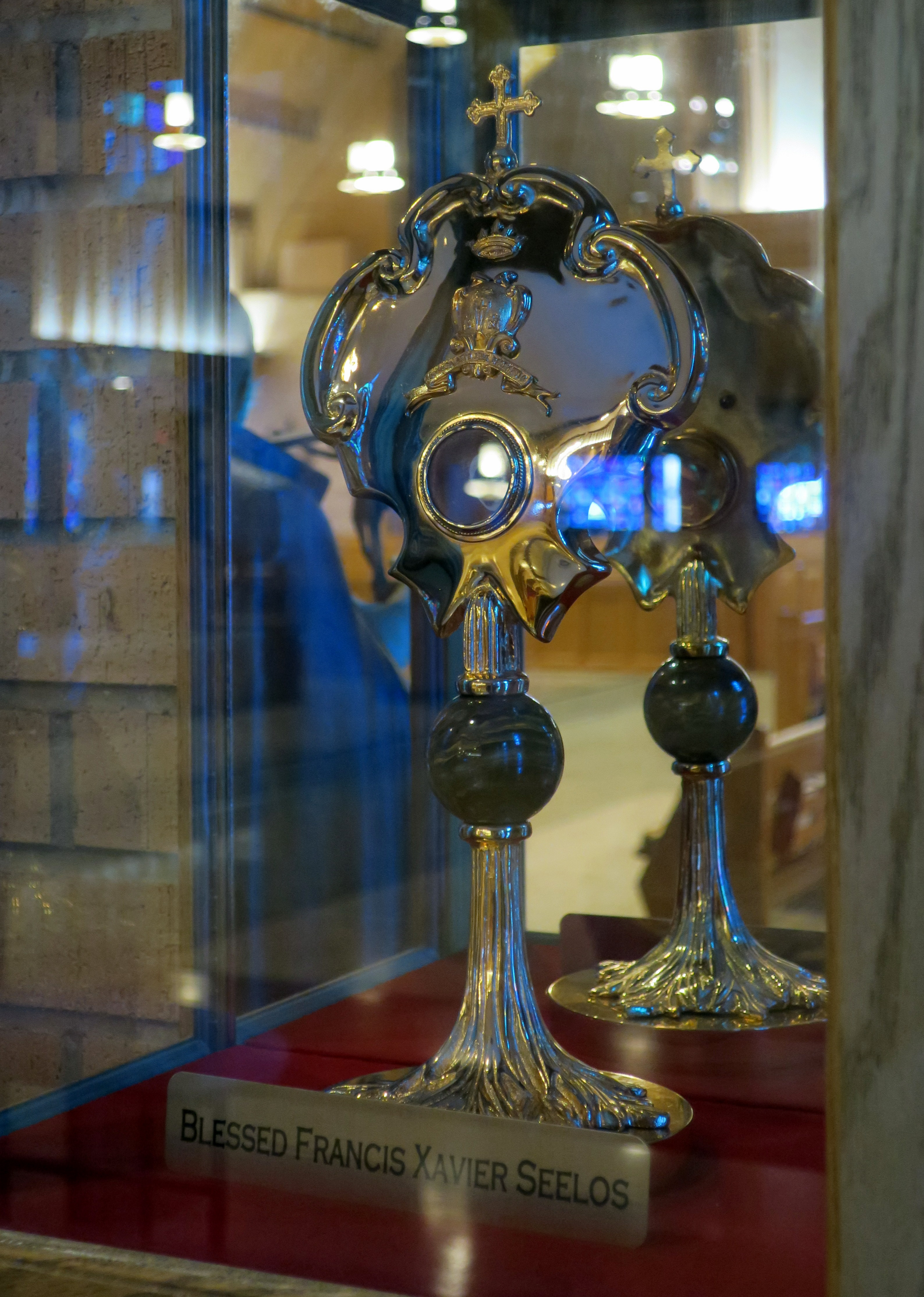
A Seelos relic, St. Gerard Church, Lima, Ohio.

Theologians approved Seelos's spiritual writings on May 8, 1912. His cause for canonization was formally opened, and he was granted the title Servant of God.Pope John Paul II beatified Seelos in St. Peter's Square in Vatican City on April 9, 2000. In the beatification homily, the pope stated:

"Today, Bl. Francis Xavier Seelos invites the members of the Church to deepen their union with Christ in the sacraments of Penance and the Eucharist. Through his intercession, may all who work in the vineyard for the salvation of God's people be encouraged and strengthened in their task."

Seelos is commemorated in the Martyrology on October 4th.

== Legacy ==
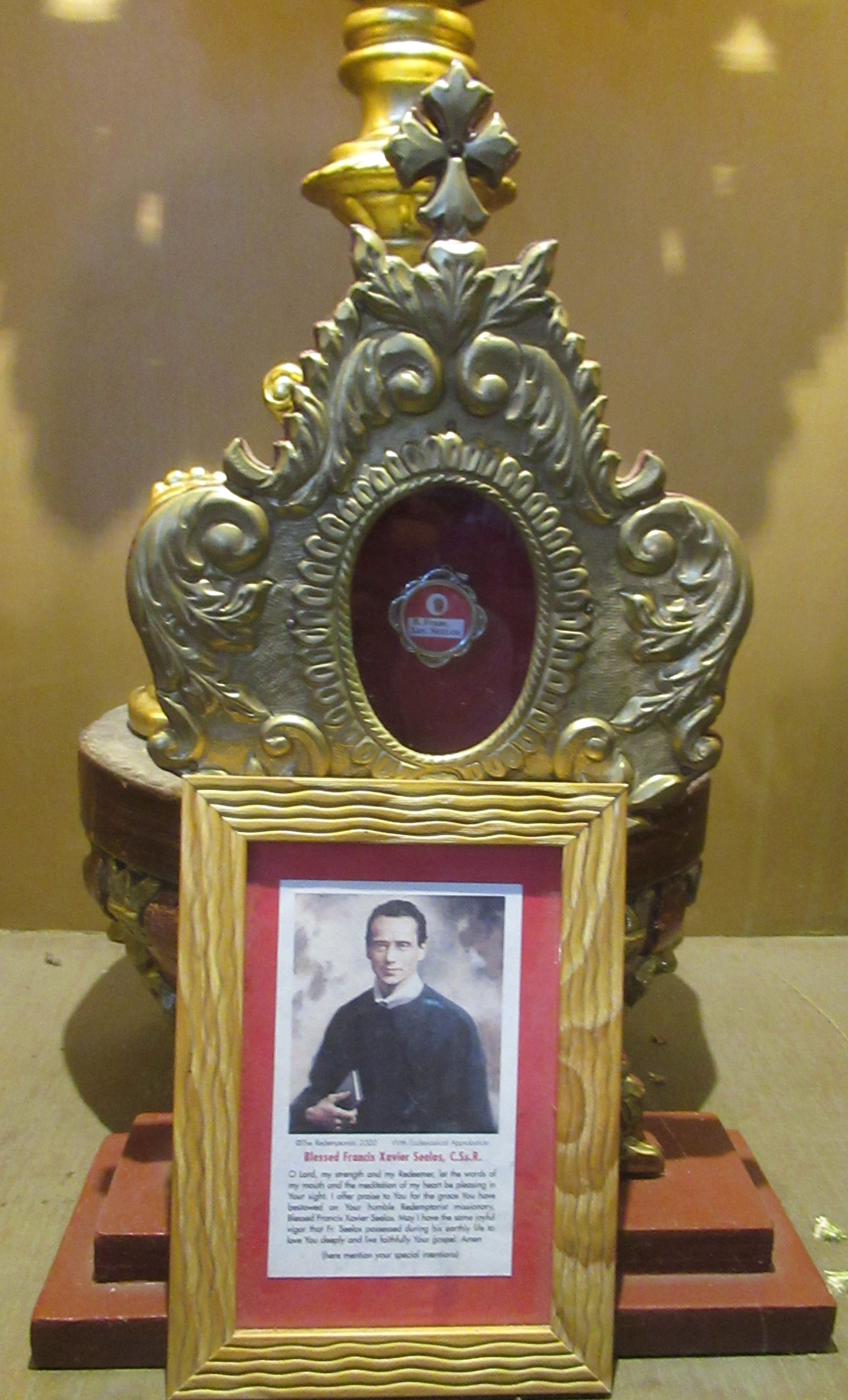
A Seelos reliquary, San Bartolome Church, Pampanga, Philippines

=== National Shrine ===
The National Shrine of Blessed Francis Xavier Seelos is located in St. Mary's Assumption Church in New Orleans. The shrine contains the official portrait of Seelos, used for his beatification, and photographs of him. It also has a reliquary that houses Seelos' remains.

=== Other institutions ===
The following institutions were named after Seelos:

- Blessed Francis Seelos Academy, Wexford, Pennsylvania
- Blessed Francis Xavier Seelos Church, Biloxi, Mississippi
- Blessed Francis Xavier Seelos Church, New Orleans
- Blessed Francis Xavier Seelos Church, Spanish Fort, Alabama
