= New Basin Canal =

Canal in Louisiana, United States

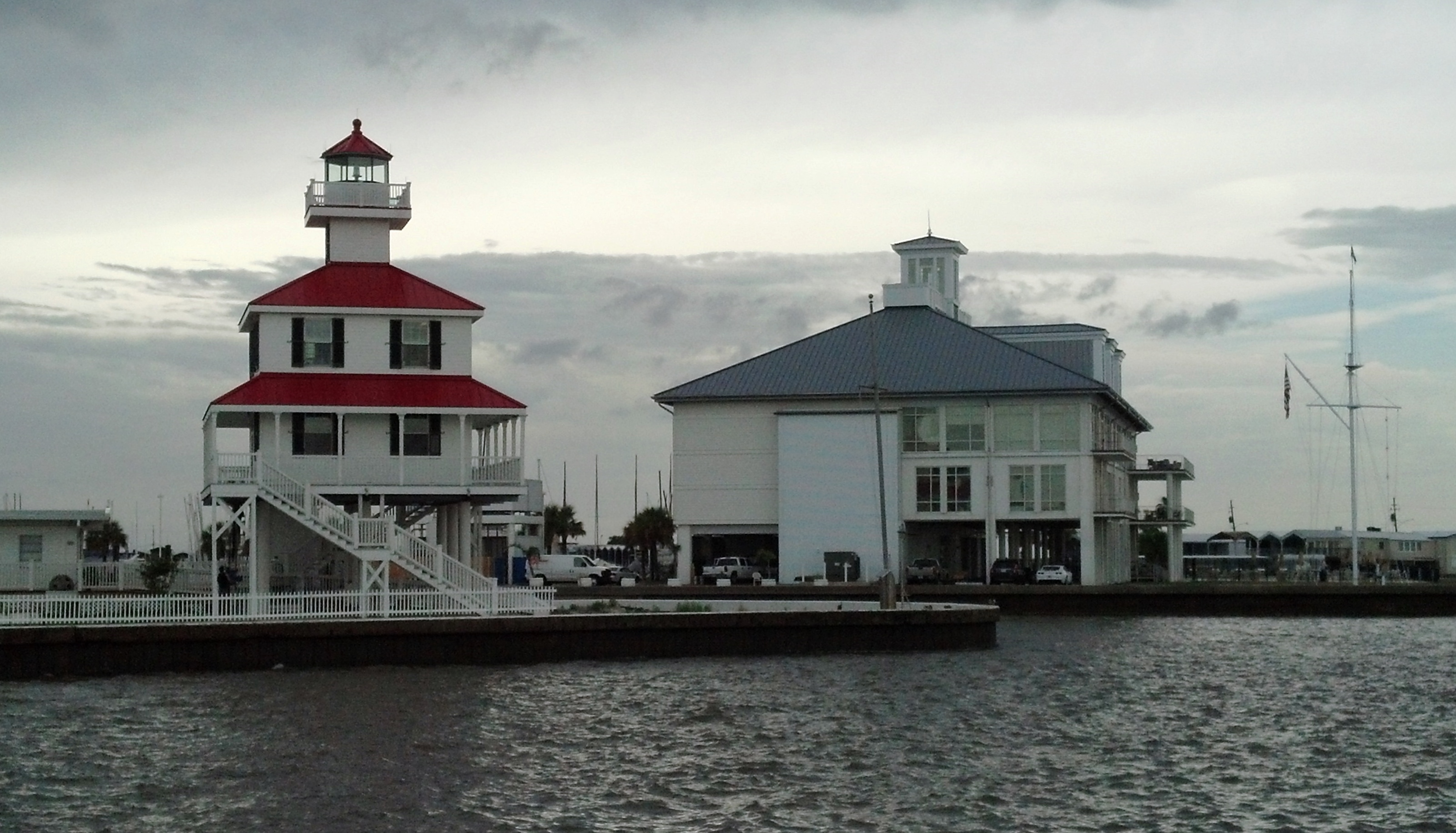
New Canal Lighthouse

The New Basin Canal, also known as the New Canal and the New Orleans Canal, was a shipping canal in New Orleans, Louisiana, that operated from the 1830s into the 1940s.

== History ==
The New Basin Canal was constructed by the New Orleans Canal and Banking Company, incorporated in 1831 with capital of 4 million US dollars. The intent was to build a shipping canal from Lake Pontchartrain through the swamp land to the booming uptown or "American" section of the city, to compete with the existing Carondelet Canal in the downtown Creole part of the city.

Work commenced the following year. Yellow fever ravaged workers in the swamp in back of town, and the loss of slaves was judged too expensive; so most of the work was done by Irish immigrant laborers. The Irish workers died in great numbers, but the Company had no trouble finding more men to take their place, as shiploads of poor Irishmen arrived in New Orleans. Many were willing to risk their lives in hazardous, back-breaking work for a chance to earn $1 a day. By 1838, after an expense of $1 million, the 60-foot (18 m) wide 3.17-mile (5.10 km) long canal was complete enough to be opened to small vessels drawing 6 feet (1.8 m), with $0.375 per ton charged for passage. Over the next decade the canal was enlarged to 12 feet (3.7 m) deep, 100 feet (30 m) wide, and with shell roads alongside.

No official count was kept of the deaths of the immigrant workers; estimates ranging from 500 to 20,000 and more have been published, with 8,000 being a commonly cited total. Many were buried without a grave marker in the levee and roadway-fill beside the canal. Contemporary immigration records and other primary documents do not support a level of Irish population in the city sufficient to support the upper-end of the estimated deaths, and historian Laura D. Kelley, in her 2014 book The Irish in New Orleans, urged a downward revision of the number of estimated deaths due to the lack of evidence to support the claims and the labor needs of other contemporary canal projects. She also noted that deaths from cholera epidemics in the early 1830s were later remembered as being suffered during the canal's construction. While it is certain workers died constructing the canal, the first claim of 10,000 deaths did not come until 1937 in a Times-Picayune article by Meigs O. Frost. The article included lyrics from a popular song that mentioned 10,000 Irish laborers dying from cholera during the canal's construction. Over the years, press reports rose to as high as 20,000 before dropping to the commonly heard 8,000 deaths. Contemporary press reports focused more on labor unrest when Irish workers recruited from Philadelphia went on strike to protest the canal's owner's failure to pay them according to the contracts, not worker deaths.

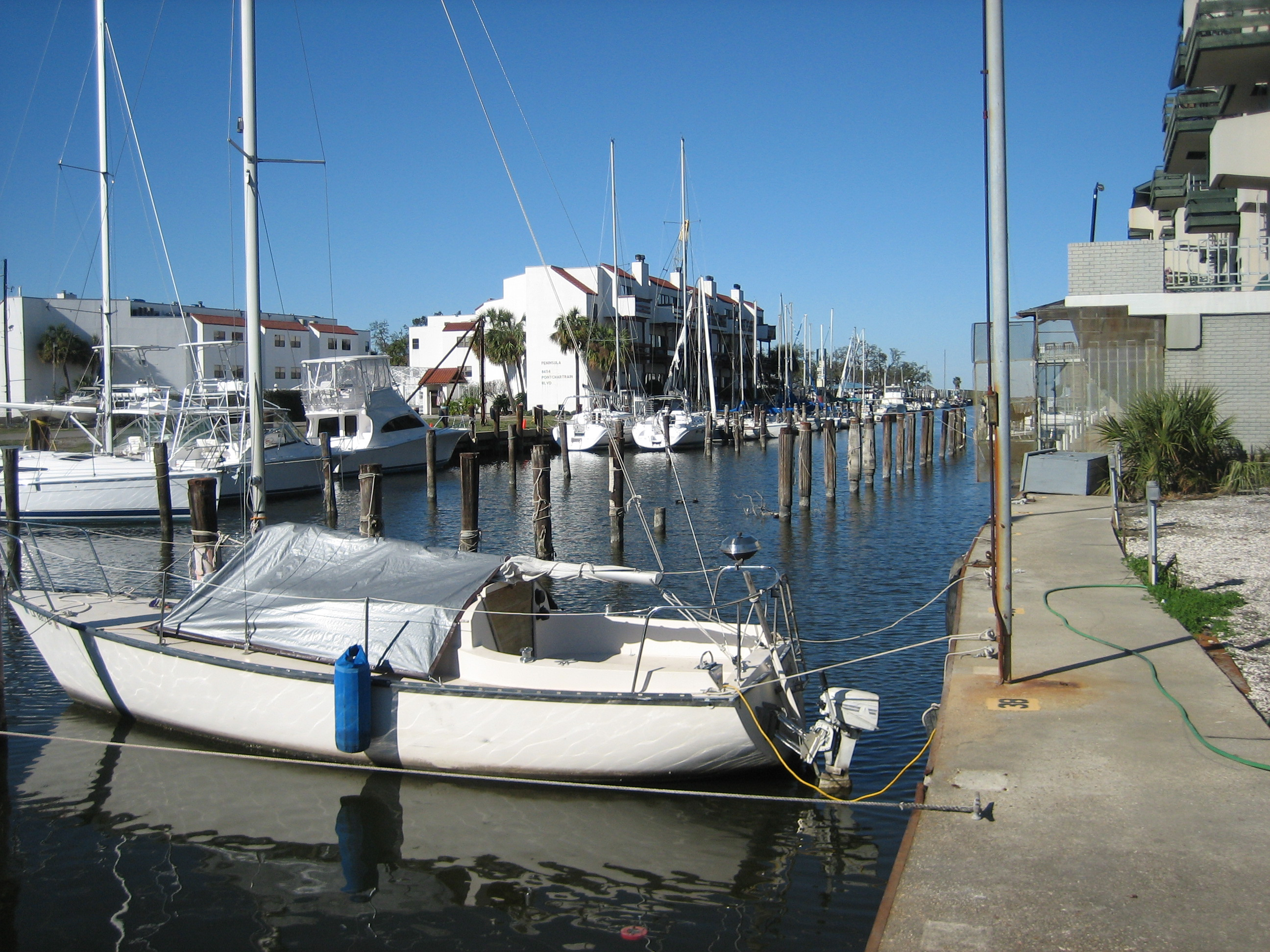
Small pleasure boats now moor on the only remaining portion of the canal that was important to regional commerce in the 19th century

The canal originally joined with Lake Pontchartrain around the present day intersection of Robert E. Lee and West End Boulevards, but jetties were added on both sides extending it farther into the lake. The New Canal Lighthouse or more commonly New Basin Canal Lighthouse was built on the far end of one of the jetties at the entrance to the canal. Starting from the entrance of the canal, it headed south through the swamp, cut through the high ground of Metairie Ridge, through the mid-city lowlands, into the city, ended in a turning basin at Rampart Street and Howard Avenue in what is now the New Orleans Central Business District.

The canal was commercially important through the 19th century, and served additional uses such as improving drainage in nearby areas and being used to harvest the bald cypress trees in what is now the Lakeview neighborhood. They were brought into the city near the River, via the canal, and used to build many uptown houses.

The importance of the canal declined after World War I, especially with the opening of the Industrial Canal in 1923. In 1936 the Louisiana State Legislature passed a state constitutional amendment to close the canal. In 1937–38 the area back to Claiborne Avenue was filled in, but the rest of the length continued functioning on a more limited scale until after World War II. It was filled in by about 1950, except for a half-mile-long stretch at the lakefront by the lighthouse, which has been used as a harbor for small boats and yachts and continues to exist.

Much of the route became the Pontchartrain Expressway in the 1950s, which was incorporated into I-10 the following decade. The stretch from the Interstate to just shy of Robert E. Lee Blvd was developed into the present-day New Basin Canal Park, a linear green space paralleling West End Boulevard. On November 4, 1990, the Irish Cultural Society of New Orleans dedicated a large Kilkenny marble Celtic cross in New Basin Canal Park to commemorate all of the Irish workers who perished constructing the canal.

The lighthouse which stands at the entrance to the canal, was added to the National Register of Historic Places in 1985 as the New Canal Lighthouse. It was heavily damaged during the 2005 hurricane season by Hurricanes Katrina and Rita. The first floor had collapsed and its cupola had fallen off. In 2006, the Lake Pontchartrain Basin Foundation signed a lease with the United States Coast Guard to repair the damaged lighthouse. It was disassembled and the building was put into storage. Reconstruction of the lighthouse began in February 2012 and was completed in 2013.

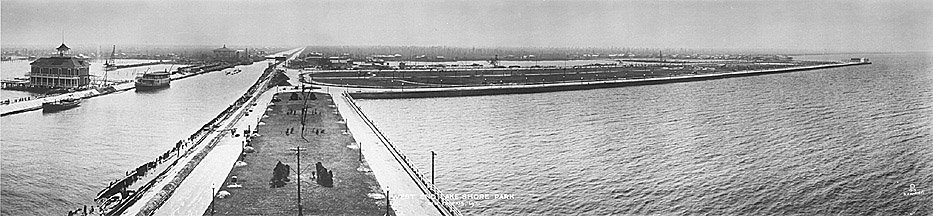
The New Basin Canal and adjacent West End Park in 1915, viewed from Lake Pontchartrain towards the City of New Orleans, three miles to the south.

== Geography ==
The New Canal Lighthouse is located on 30°1′37″N 90°6′47″W (30.026944, -90.113056).

== Gallery ==
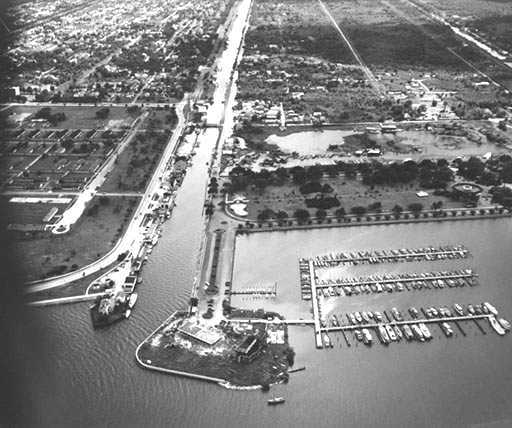
New Basin Canal Aerial View - 1948

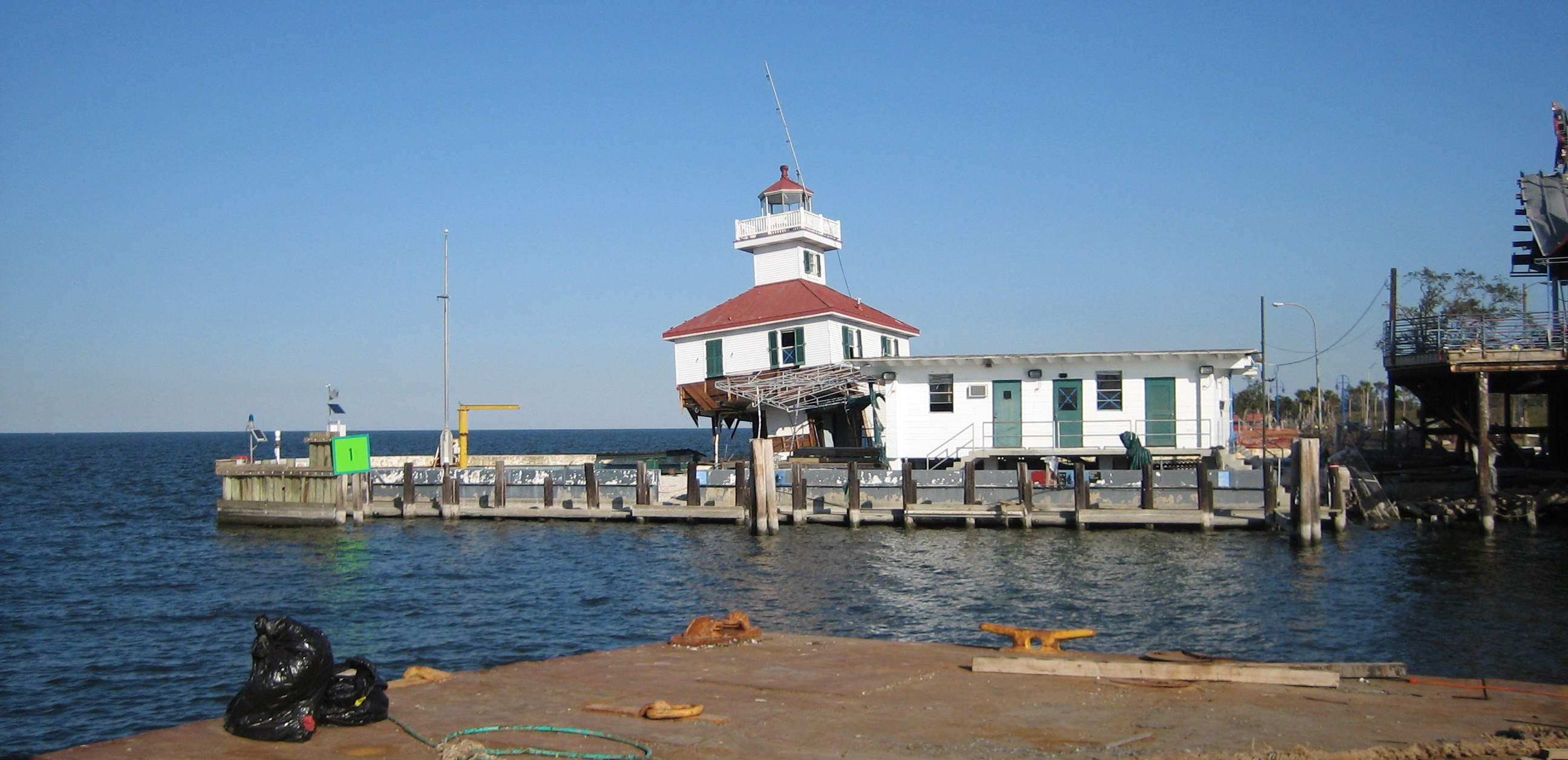
New Canal Lighthouse - Damage after Hurricanes Katrina and Rita - 2005

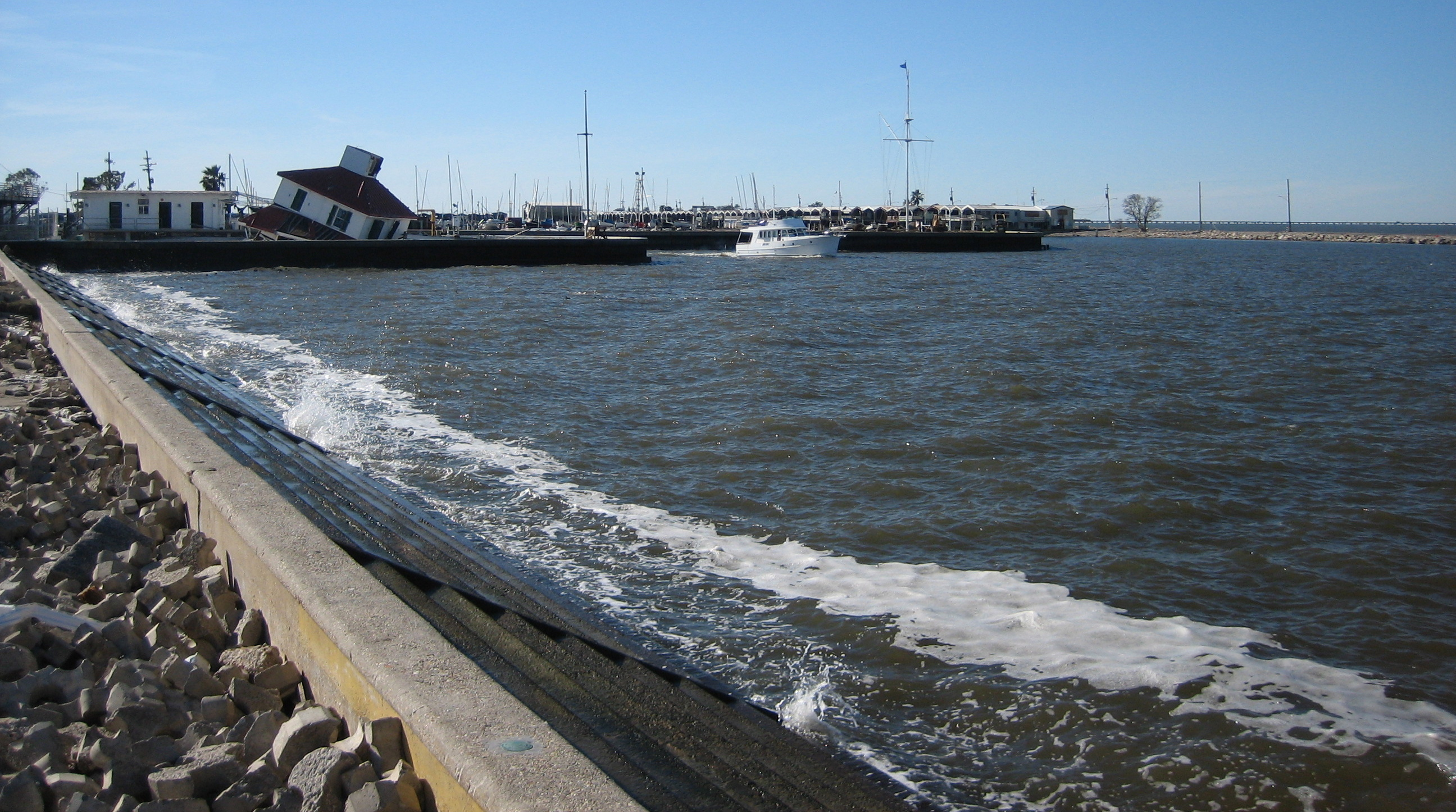
New Canal Lighthouse - Collapse after Hurricanes Katrina and Rita - 2005

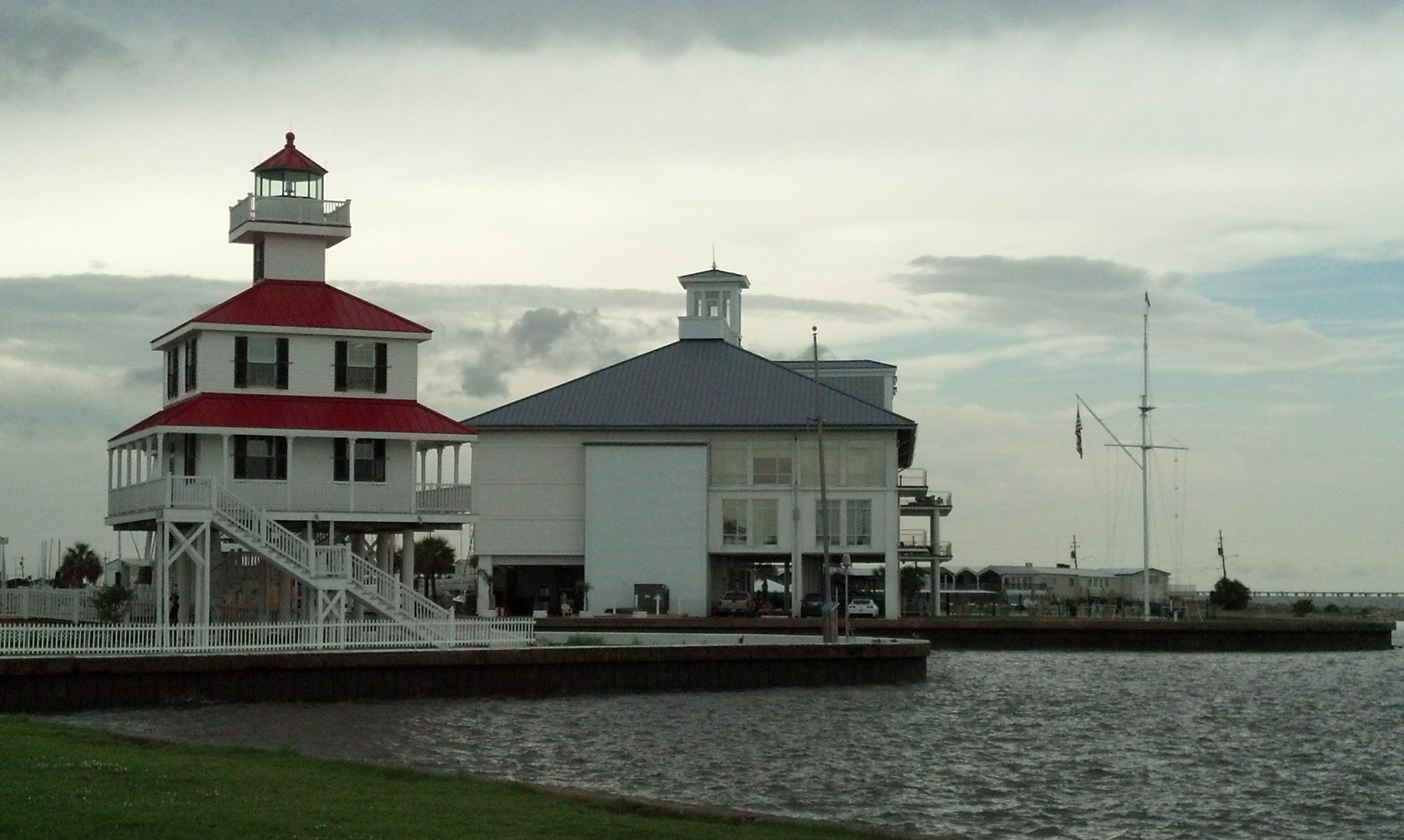
New Canal Lighthouse - 2013

== See also ==
- Drainage in New Orleans
- Lakeview, New Orleans
- New Canal Lighthouse
- West End, New Orleans
