= St. Mary's Assumption Church (New Orleans, Louisiana) =

Historic church in Louisiana, United States

- U.S. National Register of Historic Places
- U.S. National Historic Landmark
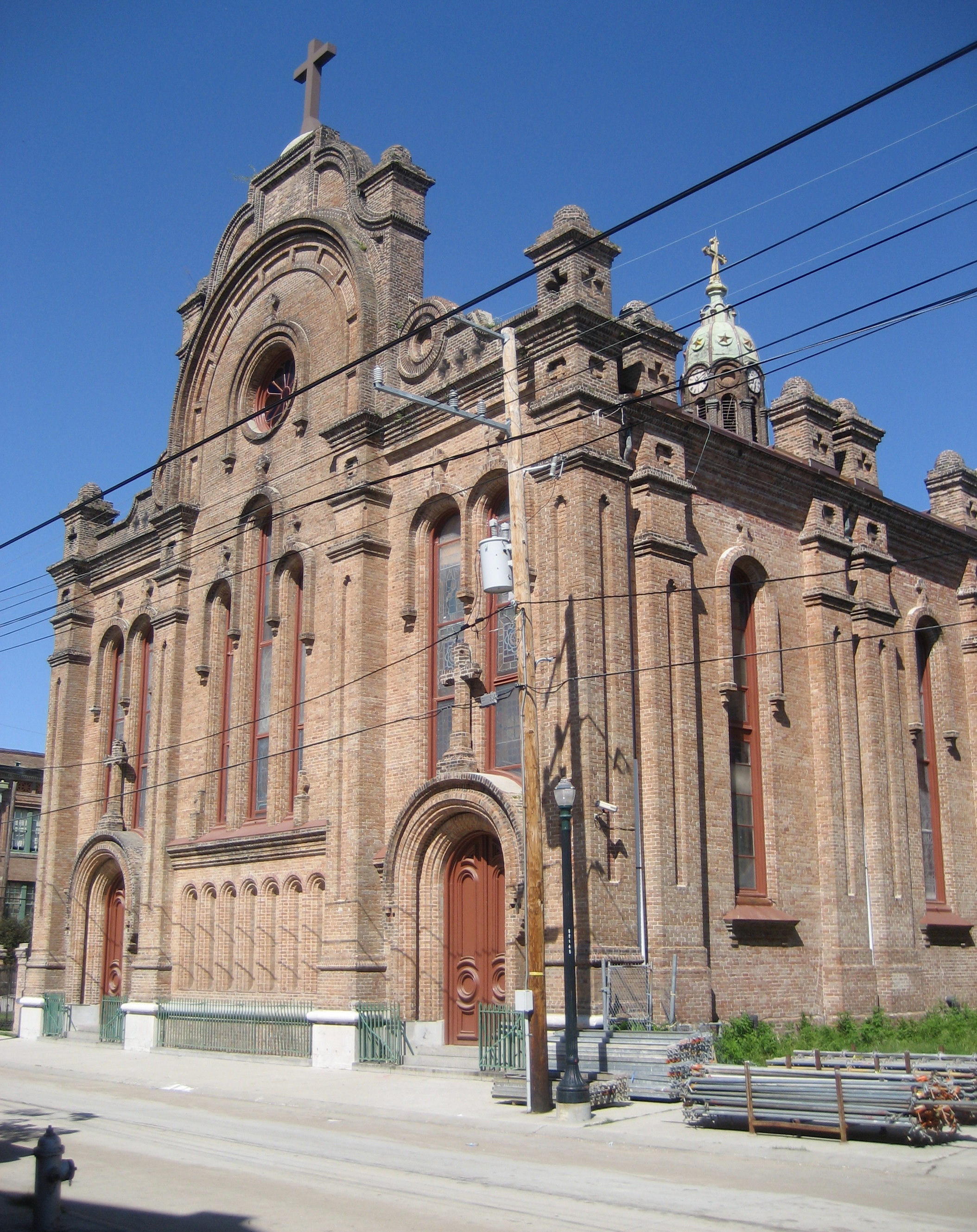

- Location within East New Orleans Location within Louisiana Location within the United States
- Location: Corner of Constance and Josephine New Orleans, Louisiana 70130
- Coordinates: 29°55′44.75″N 90°4′29.01″W
- Built: 1860
- Architectural style: Baroque Revival, Late Victorian
- NRHP reference No.: 71000361

Significant dates
- Added to NRHP: August 12, 1971
- Designated NHL: May 30, 1974

St. Mary's Assumption Church is a National Historic Landmark church at Constance and Josephine Streets in New Orleans, Louisiana, U.S. The church was completed in 1860, built for the swelling German Catholic immigrant population in the Lower Garden District section of the city (the church across the street, Saint Alphonsus Church, was built at the same time for the swelling Irish Catholic immigrant population in the same area). Both churches are extremely beautiful and ornate.

In November 2025, the Archdiocese of New Orleans placed over 150 parishes and charities in Chapter 11 bankruptcy protection as part of a settlement plan to resolve hundreds of sex abuse lawsuits. This wave of bankruptcies included this church.

== Description ==
St. Mary's Assumption is home to a shrine and museum for Blessed Francis Xavier Seelos, a German priest who came to the United States to minister to German-speaking immigrants. Fr. Seelos died while serving as the pastor at St. Mary's Assumption: after visiting and caring for the victims of yellow fever, he succumbed to the disease himself in 1867. In recognition of his virtuous life, Fr. Seelos was beatified by the Roman Catholic Church in 2000.

It was declared a National Historic Landmark in 1974, significant as a rare and elaborate example German Baroque Revival architecture.

In 1965, the church was heavily damaged by Hurricane Betsy, which resulted in the church being temporarily closed, and almost resulted in the church being demolished. In 2005, Hurricane Katrina caused heavy rain and wind damage, and water infiltration damaged interior plaster and ceiling.

Best-selling novelist Anne Rice had her marriage convalidated at St. Mary's Assumption with her husband Stan. Rice included the church in her fictional work. In The Witching Hour, two of the main characters were married at St. Mary's Assumption. In Blackwood Farm, the church is the setting of a funeral. In 2005, Rice added text and pictures on her website that encouraged donations to St. Mary's Assumption to help repair the damage caused by Hurricane Katrina.

The church has two pipe organs. The grand organ in the second balcony was constructed in 1861 by the firm of Simmons & Willcox of Boston. It was rebuilt with new tubular pneumatic chests in 1900 by William Schuelke. It was partially electrified ca. 1920. The choir organ was constructed by Pels & VanLeeuwen of Alkmaar, The Netherlands, in 1971 for the chapel of First Presbyterian Church of Royal Oak, Michigan, as that firm's Op. 775. It was relocated to St. Mary's Assumption Church in 2015.

== See also ==
- List of National Historic Landmarks in Louisiana
- National Register of Historic Places listings in Orleans Parish, Louisiana
