= St. Alphonsus Church (New Orleans, Louisiana) =

Historic church in Louisiana, United States

- U.S. National Register of Historic Places
- U.S. National Historic Landmark
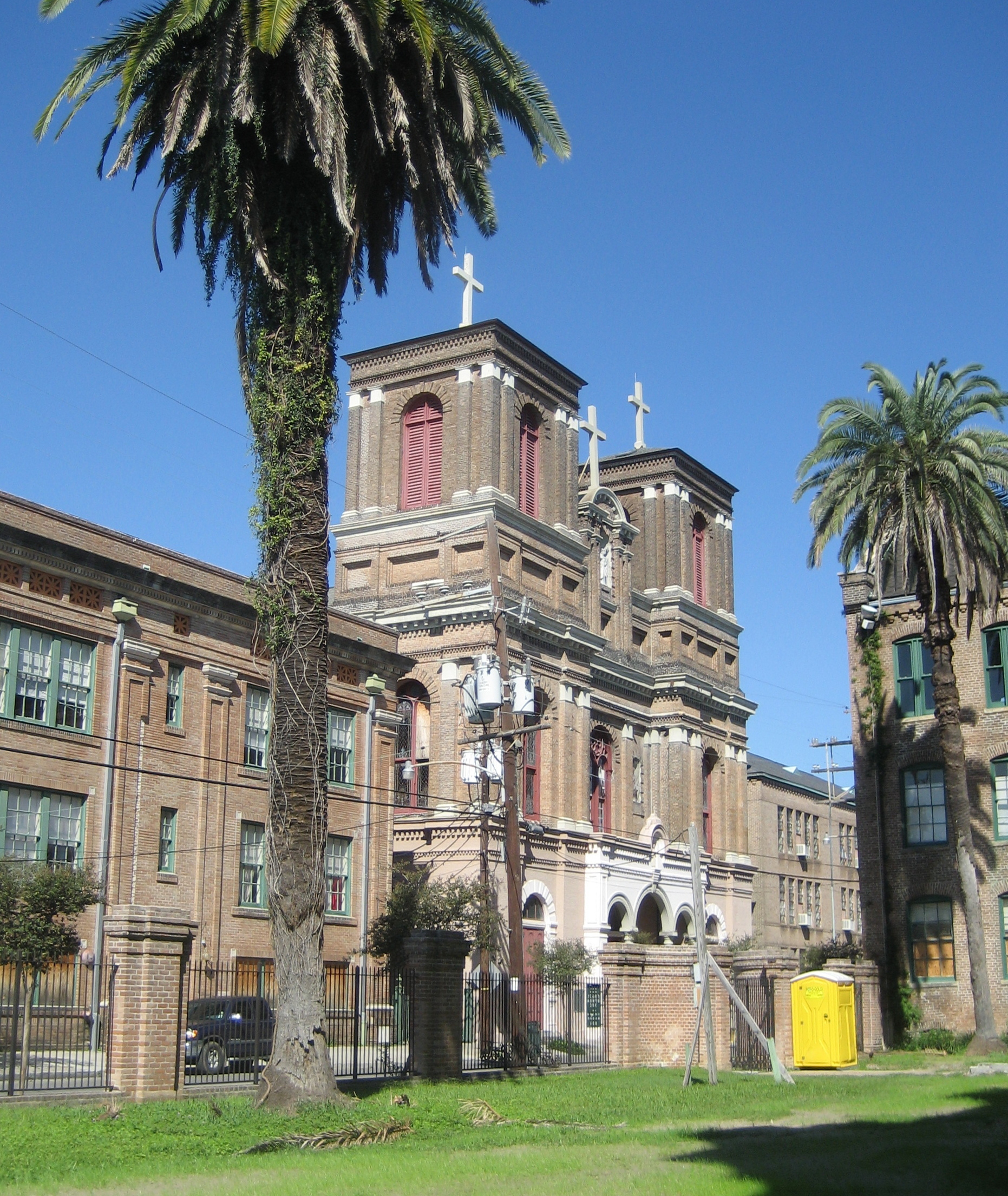

- Location within East New Orleans Location within Louisiana Location within the United States
- Location: 2029 Constance St., New Orleans, Louisiana
- Coordinates: 29°55′50″N 90°4′25″W
- Area: less than one acre
- Built: 1855
- Architect: Louis L. Long
- Architectural style: Italianate and Renaissance Revival, Late Victorian
- NRHP reference No.: 73000872

Significant dates
- Added to NRHP: May 22, 1973
- Designated NHL: June 19, 1996

St. Alphonsus Church (French: Église Saint-Alphonse) is a historic former church building at 2029 Constance Street in New Orleans, Louisiana. Completed in 1857, it is one of the few surviving national examples of a richly multi-colored church interior predating the 1870s, and a high quality example of ecclesiastical Italianate architecture. It was declared a National Historic Landmark in 1996 for its architectural significance. It is now home to the St. Alphonsus Art and Cultural Center.

== Building ==
The former St. Alphonsus Church is located in New Orleans' Lower Garden District neighborhood, on the north side of Constance Street, between St. Andrew and Josephine Streets. It has a complex and richly decorated symmetrical façade, with a central entrance area flanked by two square towers topped by crosses. The façade is ornamented with pilasters, corbelled brick panels, and niches in which statues are mounted. The interior is also richly ornamented and has a coved plaster ceiling which have been painted with artwork by Dominique Canova. Its stained glass windows are Bavarian in origin, coming from F. X. Zettler. The floors are covered in mosaic tile.

== History ==
Completed in 1857, St. Alphonsus served as a parish for the Irish Catholic community of the Lower Garden District section of the city. (Other churches nearby served the Francophone and Germanic Catholic communities, including St. Mary's Assumption Church, the church built across the street for the German Catholic community). As various parishes were merged later in history, St. Alphonsus was closed in 1979.

In the 1980s it was taken over by a local community group and now serves a community center.

== See also ==
- List of National Historic Landmarks in Louisiana
- National Register of Historic Places listings in Orleans Parish, Louisiana
