= San Bartolome Church (Magalang) =

Roman Catholic church in Pampanga, Philippines

Magalang Church
- San Bartolome Parish Church
- Pisamban Maragul ning Magalang (Kapampangan); Parokya ng San Bartolome (Filipino); Iglesia Parroquial de San Bartolome de Magalang (Spanish)
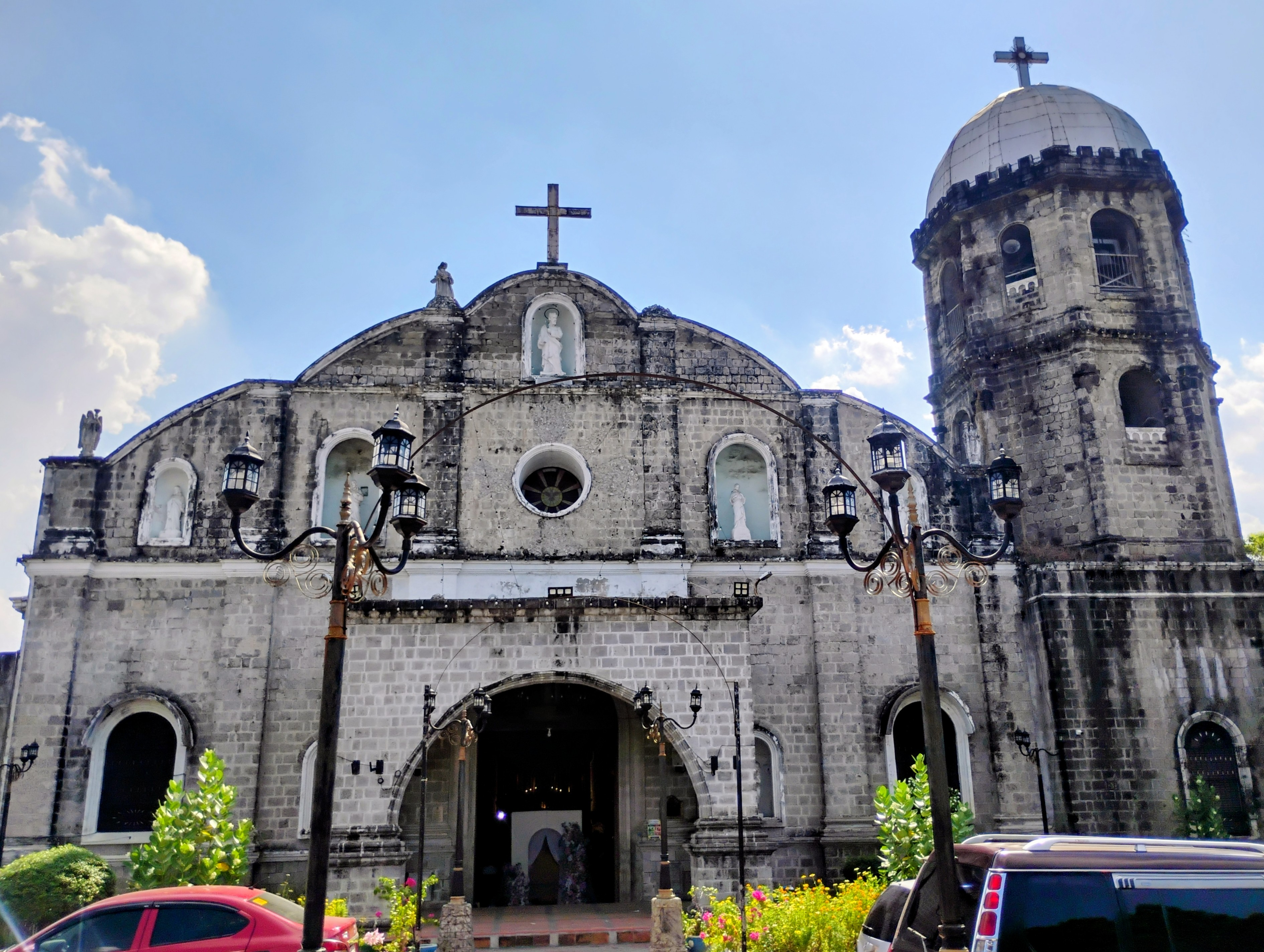
- Church façade in 2026

- Location in Luzon Location in the Philippines
- 15°12′52″N 120°39′36″E
- Location: Brgy. San Nicolas I, Magalang, Pampanga
- Country: Philippines
- Denomination: Roman Catholic

History
- Status: Parish church
- Founded: April 30, 1605
- Founder: Fr. Gonzalo de Salazar O.S.A.
- Dedication: Saint Bartholomew

Architecture
- Functional status: Active
- Architect(s): Fr. Ramon M. Sarrionandia, O.S.A.
- Architectural type: Church building
- Style: Baroque

Specifications
- Length: 55 metres (180 ft)
- Width: 24 metres (79 ft)
- Height: 7 metres (23 ft)
- Materials: Stone, mortar, sand, brick, wood

Administration
- Archdiocese: San Fernando

Clergy
- Archbishop: Most. Rev. Florentino G. Lavarias, D.D.
- Priest: Rev. Fr. Juan Danilo L. Dizon

San Bartolome Parish Church, commonly known as Magalang Church, is a 19th-century Baroque Roman Catholic church located at Barangay San Nicolas I, Magalang, Pampanga, Philippines. The parish church, dedicated to Saint Bartholomew the Apostle, is under the Archdiocese of San Fernando.

== History ==
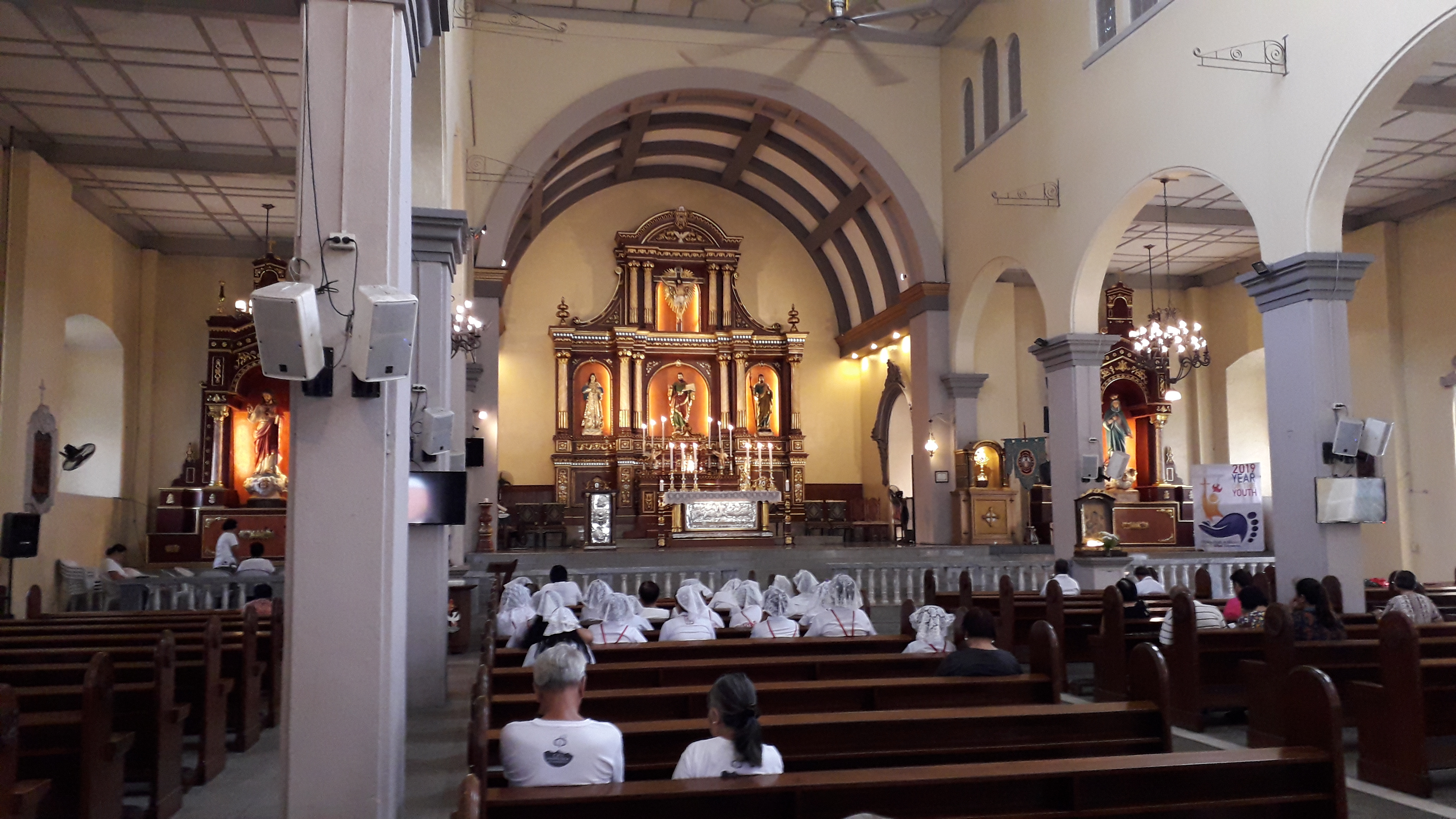
Church interior in 2019

The town of Magalang was started as a sub-parish (visita) of the neighboring town of Arayat on December 19, 1598, with Fr. Andres Hernandez as its vicar. On April 30, 1605, Magalang was officially separated from the mother town of Arayat, and Fr. Gonzalo de Salazar, OSA was appointed its first pastor. After Fr. Salazar's transfer, its parish was reverted to Arayat. In 1686, Augustinian documents mentioned that Magalang together with Tarlac, was under the pastorship of Fr. Pedro de Flores, OSA. The town was initially located in Macapsa; and may have been relocated a few more times due to frequent flooding of the Chico River and subsequent revolts. In 1734, it was transferred to San Bartolome.

In 1858, Magalang experienced devastating floods due to the overflowing Parua River. Two years later, a Royal Decree was issued, creating the new town of Concepcion, composed of barrios of Magalang located on the northern bank of the Parua. In 1863, the town was relocated to the present site. The northern part of Magalang was separated and formally created the town of Concepcion. However, the new town was still spiritually dependent on Magalang, until the Archdiocese of Manila issued a decree, establishing the latter's parish in 1866.

The exact date of the construction of the present church remains unclear although, it is suggested in the records that the construction of a structure may have started at around 1725, when the convent of Magalang was relieved from paying its dues to the Augustinian province. The current church, was built by Fr. Ramon Sarrionandia, OSA in 1866. In 1875, Fr. Baltasar Gamarra, OSA finished the facade and the two storey bell tower. In 1887, Fr. Fernando Vasquez, OSA continued the finishing touches and installed two large bells in 1889 and 1890 respectively; and its tones is regarded as one of the best in Pampanga. Fr. Toribio Fanjul, OSA renovated the church flooring and sacristy in 1891. During the Philippine Revolution, the church convent was occupied by the revolutionaries, and it was converted into a prison for Spanish captives. On November 5, 1899, the Americans captured the convent from the revolutionaries, and they reconstituted as their military headquarters in Magalang until 1901. During the Japanese occupation, Japanese soldiers used the belfry as an observatory post.

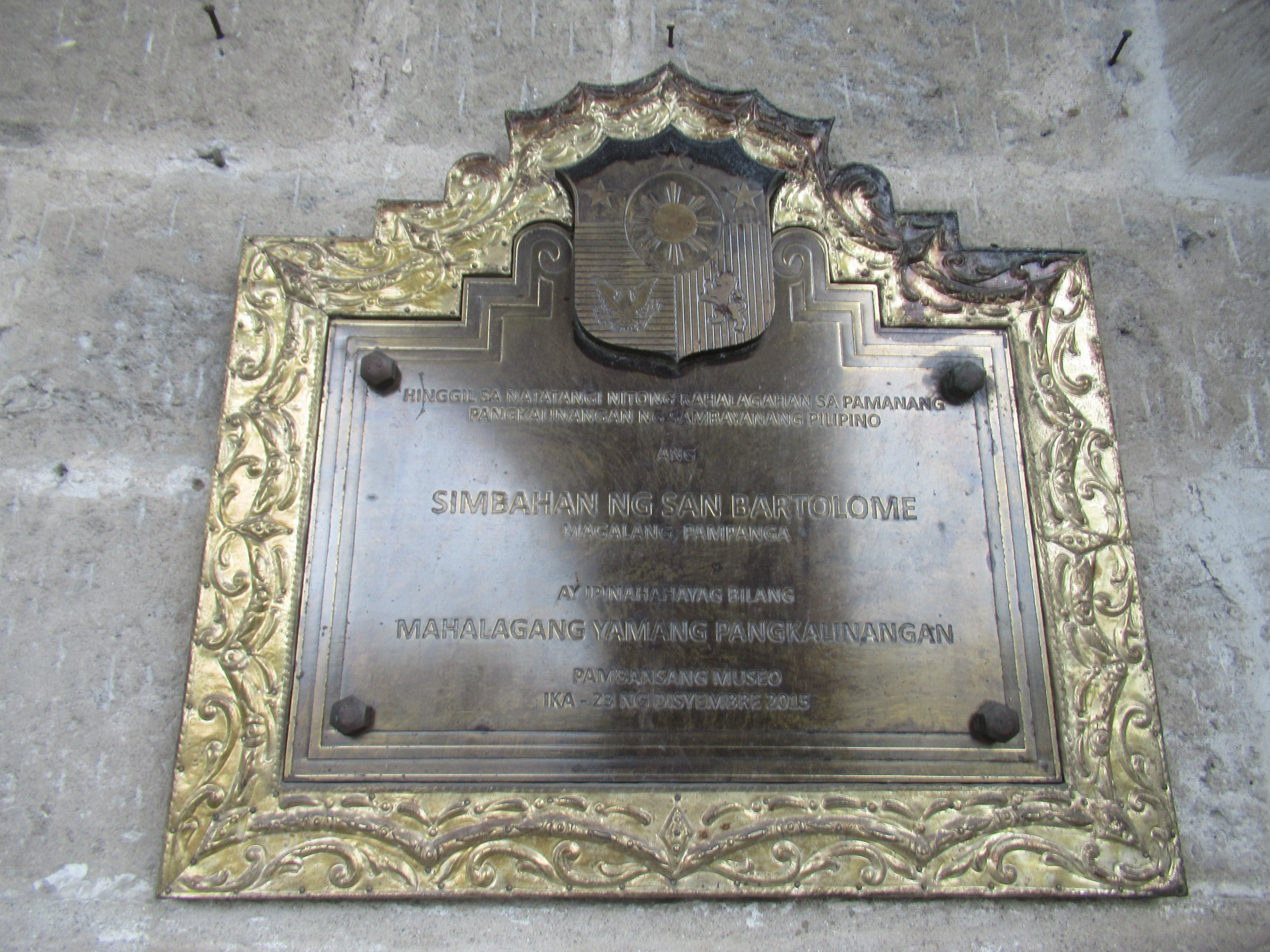
Important Cultural Property (Philippines) 2015 marker

In early 1950s, a major renovation of the church was done during the early administration of Rev. Fr. Pedro N. Magtoto. The old retablo was demolished, to give way the second altar, composed of large crucifix at the center of the altar. The wooden flooring are removed, and the choir loft was demolished. In 1978, the old convent was renovated and converted into parish hall during the administration of Rev. Fr. Odon T. Santos. During his administration also, the concrete Stations of the Cross were installed and the altar was further renovated. In 2002, Rev. Fr. Raul C. de los Santos renovated the altar and repaired the convent. In 2015, Rev. Fr. Mario Sol M. Gabriel initiated the revival of the original retablo. He also mechanized the existing old church bells, constructed the steel fence and installed a modern ventilation system inside the church.

In December 23, 2015, the National Museum of the Philippines recognized the church as one of the Important Cultural Properties of the Philippines.

== List of parish priests ==
- Rev. Fr. Juan Severino Mallari (1813-1825)
- Rev. Fr. Francisco Panlilio (1898–1904)
- Rev. Fr. Juan Almario (1904–1907)
- Rev. Fr. Felipe D. Romero (1907–1923)
- Rev. Fr. Sixto M. Manaloto (1923–1952)
- Rev. Fr. Esteban David (1952)
- Rev. Fr. Pedro N. Magtoto (1952–1974)
- Rev. Fr. Odon T. Santos (1974–1981)
- Rev. Fr. Ruben C. Lenon (1981–1985)
- Rev. Fr. Luis Lagman (1985–1988)
- Rev. Fr. Teodulfo Tantengco (1988–1994)
- Rev. Fr. Nolasco L. Fernandez (1994–2001)
- Rev. Fr. Raul C. de los Santos (2001–2007)
- Rev. Fr. Venancio D. Viray (2007–2012)
- Rev. Fr. Manuel C. Sta. Maria (parish administrator) (2012–2013)
- Rev. Fr. Mario Sol M. Gabriel (2013–2019)
- Rev. Fr. Dino Albert N. Pineda (2019–2025)
- Rev. Fr. Juan Danilo L. Dizon (2025- 2031)

One of the church's parish priests during the Spanish era was Juan Severino Mallari, who killed at least 57 of his parishioners during his tenure from 1813 to 1825 and as part of a perceived cure to his mother's hexing. He was subsequently discovered, imprisoned for 14 years and executed in 1840, for which he became known as the first Filipino serial killer.
