= Touro, New Orleans =

Touro
- New Orleans Neighborhood
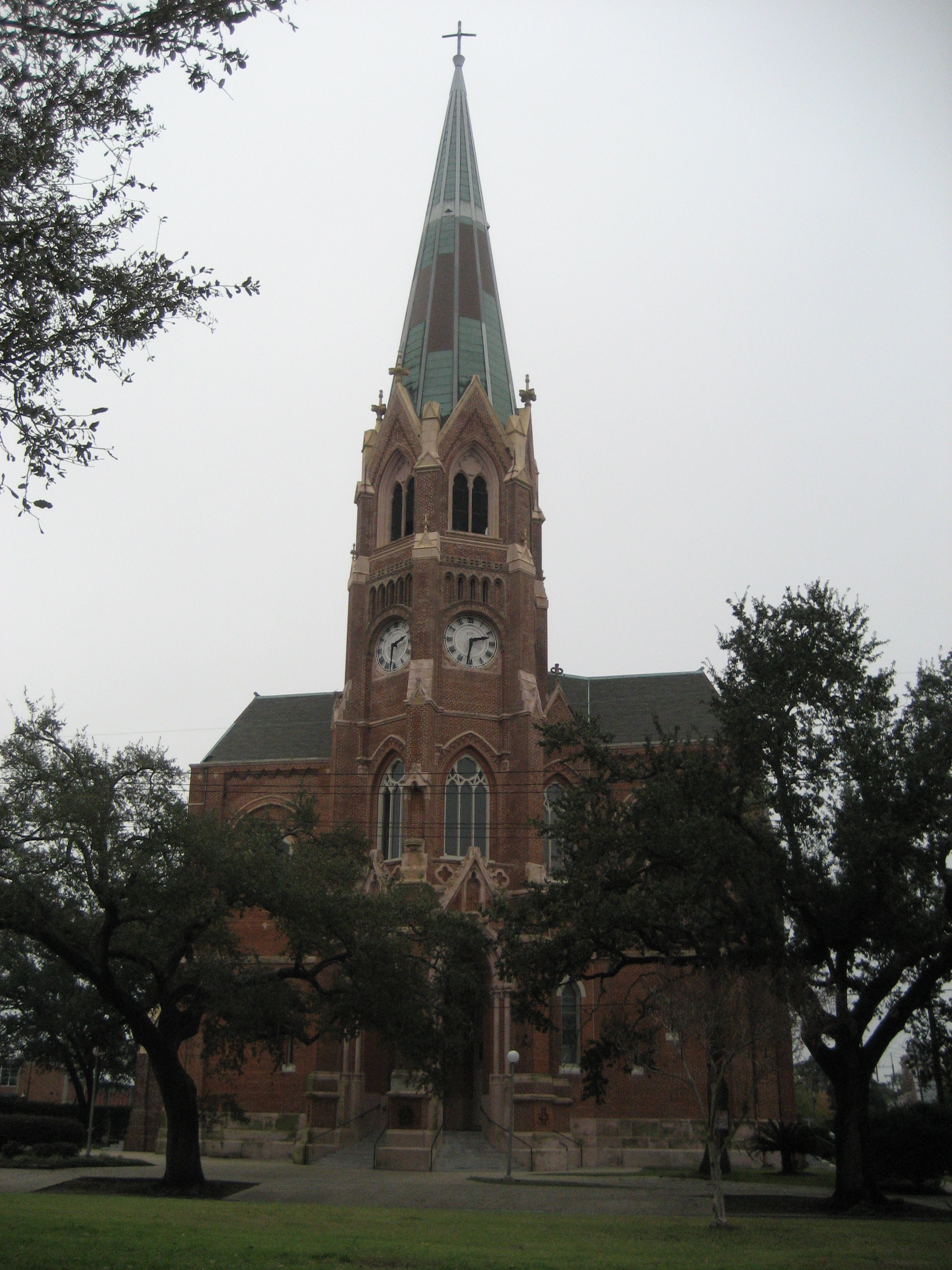
- St. Stephen's Church on Napoleon Avenue
- Interactive map of Touro
- Coordinates: 29°55′27″N 90°05′46″W
- Country: United States
- State: Louisiana
- City: New Orleans
- Planning District: District 2, Central City/Garden District

Area
  - Total: 0.30 sq mi (0.78 km^{2})
  - Land: 0.30 sq mi (0.78 km^{2})
  - Water: 0.00 sq mi (0 km^{2})
- Elevation: 3 ft (0.91 m)

Population (2010)
  - Total: 1,761
  - Density: 5,900/sq mi (2,300/km^{2})
- Time zone: UTC-6 (CST)
  - Summer (DST): UTC-5 (CDT)
- Area code: 504

Touro is a neighborhood of the city of New Orleans. A subdistrict of the Central City/Garden District Area, its boundaries as defined by the New Orleans City Planning Commission are: St. Charles Avenue to the north, Toledano Street to the east, Magazine Street to the south and Napoleon Avenue to the west.

== Geography ==
Touro is located at 29°55′27″N 90°05′46″W and has an elevation of 3 feet (0.9 m). According to the United States Census Bureau, the district has a total area of 0.30 square miles (0.8 km^{2}). 0.30 square miles (0.8 km^{2}) of which is land and 0.00 square miles (0.0 km^{2}) (0.0%) of which is water.

=== Adjacent Neighborhoods ===
- Milan (north)
- Garden District (east)
- East Riverside (south)
- Uptown (west)

=== Boundaries ===
The New Orleans City Planning Commission defines the boundaries of Touro as these streets: St. Charles Avenue, Toledano Street, Magazine Street and Napoleon Avenue.

== Demographics ==
As of the census of 2000, there were 3,242 people, 1,672 households, and 482 families living in the neighborhood. The population density was 10,807 /mi^{2} (4,053 /km^{2}).

As of the census of 2010, there were 2,998 people, 1,572 households, and 429 families living in the neighborhood.

== See also ==
- New Orleans neighborhoods
