= New Orleans Public Library =

Public library system in New Orleans, Louisiana

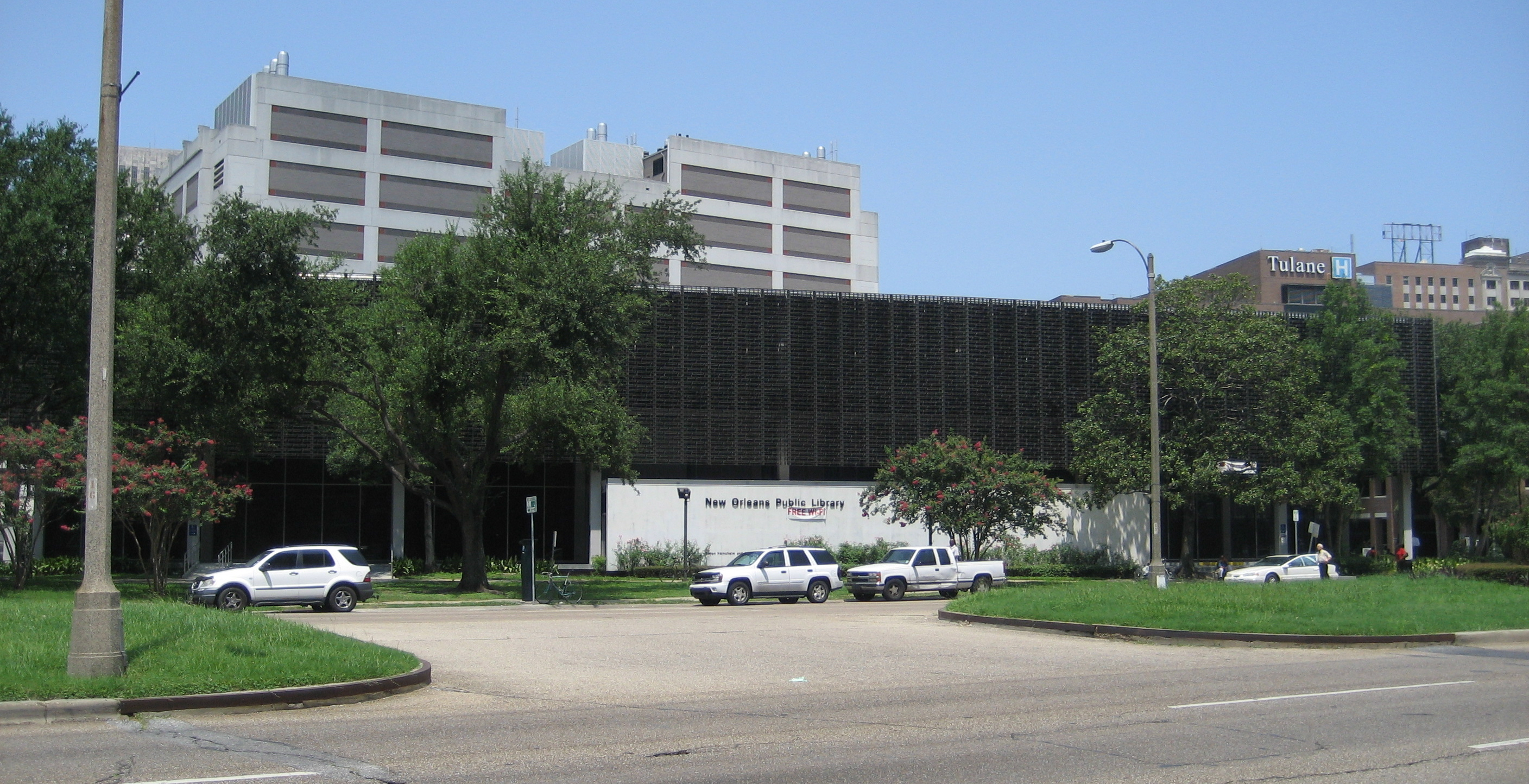
- Main Branch on Loyola Avenue
- 29.9544°N 90.0755°W
- Location: United States
- Established: 1897; 129 years ago
- Branches: 15

Collection
- Size: 466 thousand

Other information
- Website: nolalibrary.org

The New Orleans Public Library (NOPL) is the public library of the city of New Orleans, Louisiana, United States. Succeeding earlier libraries in the city, it opened in 1897. Three branches were added by 1908. Carnegie library branches were added in 1911 and 1915. By 2005 a dozen branches were open. The main library is listed on the National Register of Historic Places.

== History ==
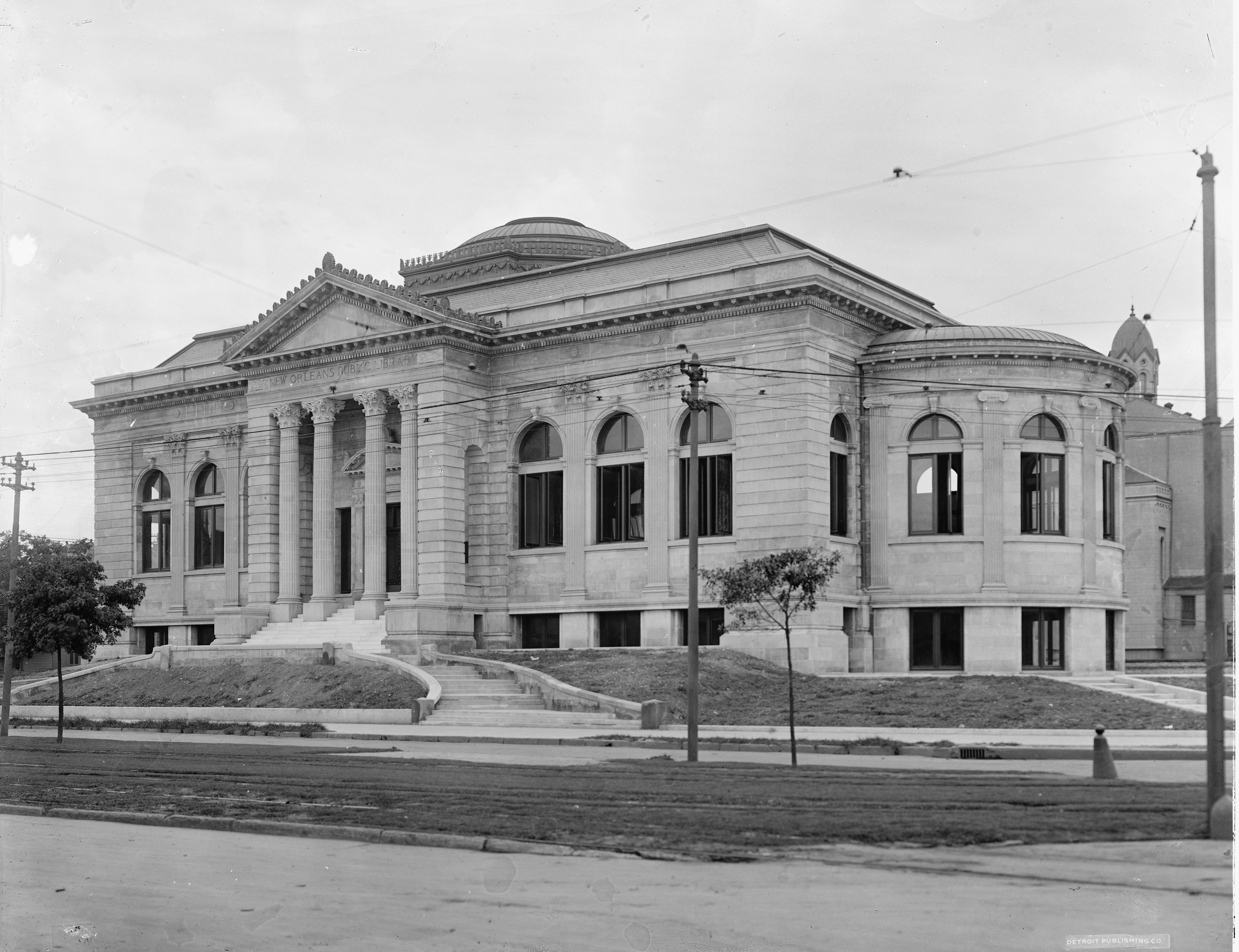
The Lee Circle Main Library around the time of its opening in 1908

The system began in 1895 in the Fisk Free and Public Library in a building on Lafayette Square. Abijah Fisk was a merchant who, over fifty years earlier, had left his house—at the corner of Iberville and Bourbon Streets—to the city for use as a library. Subsequent donations had resulted in libraries and collections not completely free and open to the citizenry. An 1896 city ordinance proposed by Mayor John Fitzpatrick combined the Fisk collection with a newer municipal library. It eventually became known as the New Orleans Public Library.

On January 18, 1897, the library opened its doors to the public. At that time the collection comprised over 35,000 volumes. A significant portion of the collection was obtained from the Fisk Free and Public Library and the Public School Lyceum and Library. The first librarian was William Beer who concurrently worked as a librarian at another library in New Orleans: the Howard Memorial Library. Beer resigned from NOPL to focus on his work at the Howard Memorial Library in 1906. His successor was Henry Gill.

A turn-of-the-20th-century donation of $50,000 from businessman Simon Hernsheim allowed the library to begin building a significant collection. In 1902 the city received $250,000 from Andrew Carnegie to build a new main library and five branches. By 1908, the new main library was open at Lee Circle and branches were open at Royal Street and Frenchmen in the Faubourg Marigny neighborhood, on Pelican Avenue in Algiers, and on Napoleon Avenue near Magazine Street uptown. In 1911 and 1915, further Carnegie branches opened at 2940 Canal St and Dryades and Philip respectively.

By 2005, NOPL had a dozen branches in addition to a newer (1960) main library on Loyola Avenue. The branches included Algiers and Napoleon, mentioned above, although renamed.

The main library is listed on the National Register of Historic Places as a contributing building in the New Orleans Lower Central Business District, as part of the district's 2006 expansion.

=== City librarians ===
City Librarians since 1896:

- 1896 – 1906: William Beer
- 1906 – 1928: Henry M. Gill
- 1928 – 1932: Daniel D. Moore
- 1932 – 1935: Edward Alexander Parsons
- 1935 – 1936: Mildred Guthrie (Acting)
- 1936 – 1937: Edmund L. McGivaren
- 1938 – 1960: John Hall Jacobs
- 1943 – 1945: George King Logan (Acting)
- 1960 – 1961: Ruth K. Robbins (Acting)
- 1961 – 1965: Jerome Cushman
- 1965 – 1967: Guenter A. Jansen
- 1967 – 1984: M. Eugene Wright, Jr.
- 1984 – 1986: George J. Guidry (Acting)
- 1986 – 1996: Daniel Wilson
- 1996 – 2004: Gertiana Williams
- 2004 – 2006: William Johnson
- 2006: Geraldine Harris (Interim) / Lance Query (Consulting)
- 2006 – 2008: Donna Schremser
- 2008 – 2010: vacant
- 2011: Shannon Aymami (Interim)
- 2011 – 2019: Charles M. Brown
- 2019 – 2020: Jessica Styons (Interim)
- 2020 – 2021: Dr. Gabriel Morley
- 2021 – present: Emily Painton

== Effects of Hurricane Katrina ==
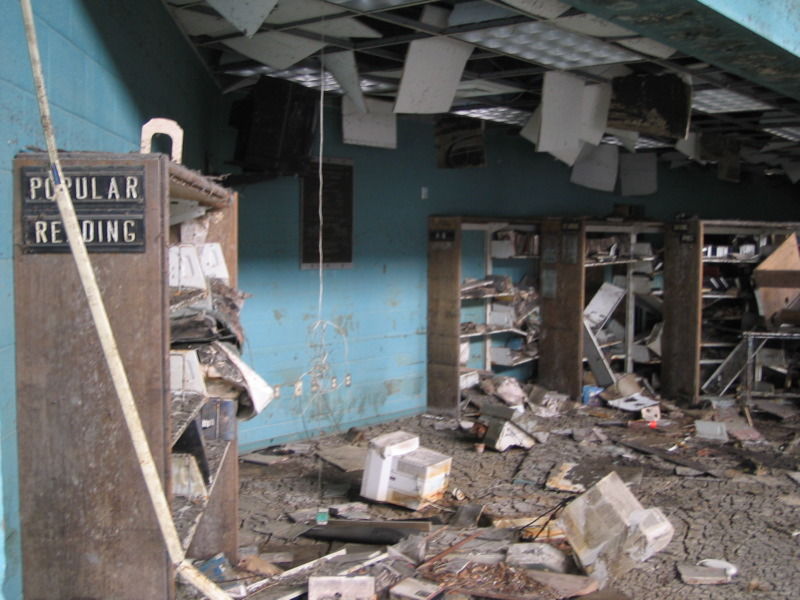
Flood-damaged interior of M.L. King Branch before it was gutted

NOPL was severely impacted by Hurricane Katrina on August 29, 2005. Damage to branch locations ran from two windows broken at the Cita Dennis Hubbell Branch in Algiers to complete destruction of the Martin Luther King Branch in the heavily damaged northern section of the Lower 9th Ward. Photographs of branch building damage are available on the library's website.

With the devastation of the city and the crippling of city government, NOPL was forced to lay off 90 percent of its employees. All libraries were closed for over two months. The 19 remaining staff members, when they were able to re-enter the city, began surveying damage and salvaging assets.

Two branches—Hubbell and Nix (on Carrollton Avenue uptown)—reopened with limited services (no circulation) on 31 October 2005. Part of the Main Library also reopened. Damage to the NOPL system is estimated at $26–30 million. Library administrators began looking for outside sources of funds to begin hiring additional staff.

== Branches ==
From the four libraries in 1908, the New Orleans Public Library system continued to expand. In 2005, the system included three regional, three major and six neighborhood branches; as of 11 June 2008 the system had ten branches, including temporary branches. By early 2017, there were fourteen branches open, with one additional branch scheduled to re-open in 2018.

=== Former branches in the 20th century ===
From 1908 to 1959, the main branch was on Lee Circle; it was demolished after the opening of the current main branch. The Marigny Branch on Frenchmen & Royal at Washington Square, one of the original Carnegie Branch libraries, was severely damaged during Hurricane Betsy in 1965 and demolished. From 1915 to 1965 there was a Central City branch at Dryades & Philip Street, originally the main "Colored" library during the era of racial segregation. A former Mid-City branch was on Canal Street at Gayoso.

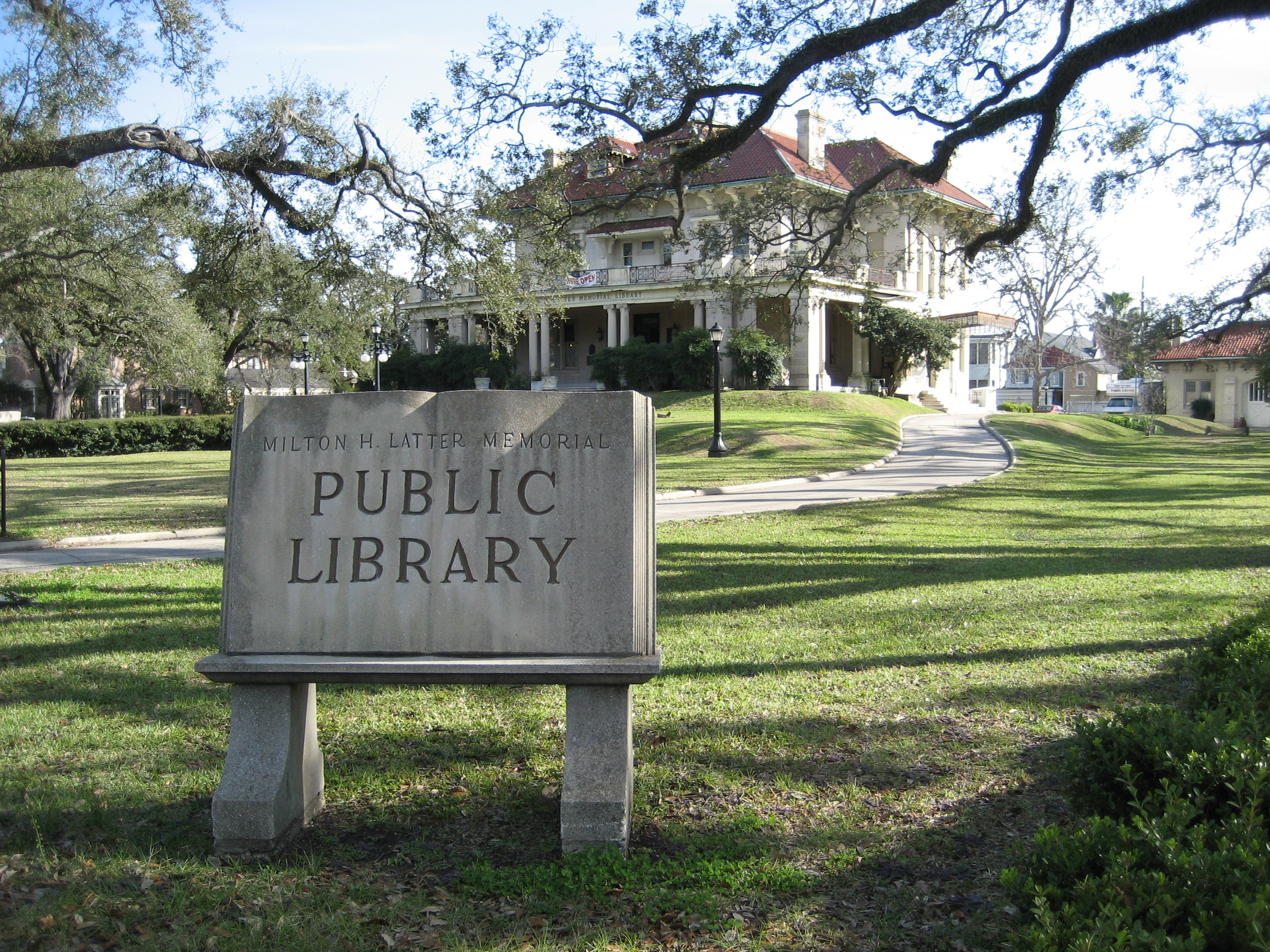
The Latter Memorial Branch, in an old St. Charles Avenue mansion

=== Summary of branch changes since 2005 ===
- Algiers Regional Branch, 3014 Holiday Drive, Algiers. Opened in 1966. Katrina damage: part of facade blew off two sides; wind-driven rain destroyed books and equipment; ceiling tiles fell; mold; closed indefinitely. A temporary library in a trailer was operated in the parking lot. Building demolished in 2010; a new larger branch library opened in summer 2012.
- Alvar Branch, 913 Alvar Street, Bywater neighborhood. A Works Progress Administration-built edifice, it opened in 1940. In Katrina, flooded about a foot of water; books, furnishings, and computers destroyed; reopened 25 June 2006.
- Central City Branch, 2405 Jackson Avenue, Central City, New Orleans. Opened 15 November 2010 in the Mahalia Jackson Center, a four-building multi-use complex which includes more than a dozen community services.
- Children's Resource Center, 913 Napoleon Avenue, Uptown New Orleans. Opened in 1908 (was Napoleon Branch, one of the Carnegie libraries). Two large windows broken by Hurricane Katrina. Branch re-opened 9 January 2006.
- Cita Dennis Hubbell Branch, 725 Pelican Avenue, Algiers Point. Opened in 1907, one of the Carnegie libraries. Closed in 1966 after the opening of the Algiers Regional Branch ; reopened as Algiers Point Branch in 1975; renamed Hubbell in 2002. Two broken windows by Hurricane Katrina; reopened 31 October 2005. In May 2008 an architectural assessment found the roof of the century-old building to be in danger of collapse, prompting a closing for an indefinite time as of 24 May 2008. A temporary library was located in the carriage house of the Algiers Point Courthouse at 225 Morgan Street; the original Carnegie building on Pelican Avenue reopened in July 2013.
- East New Orleans Regional Branch, 5641 Read Boulevard, Eastern New Orleans. Opened in 1968. Major flooding in Hurricane Katrina; fish in parking lot; closed indefinitely. Temporary branch library was in trailer on lot. New building opened in 2012.
- Main Library, 219 Loyola Avenue, New Orleans Central Business District. Opened in 1960. In Hurricane Katrina, some broken windows and floor damage from roof leaks; basement stayed dry. Partially reopened on 31 October 2005; fully operational as of August 2007. Some of the Main Library facility was used by the Federal Emergency Management Agency (FEMA) and other federal agencies and contractors working on disaster recovery.
- Martin Luther King Branch, 1611 Caffin Avenue in the Lower 9th Ward. Opened in 1995. Considered completely destroyed by Hurricane Katrina. The building, housing both the library and a school, was gutted and rebuilt. The library reopened on 5 October 2007. Site of a temporary branch funded by the Bill & Melinda Gates Foundation's Gulf Coast Libraries Project.
- Mid-City Branch, 4140 Canal Street, Mid-City New Orleans. On 11 June 2007, a new branch library opened at 330 N. Carrollton Avenue in a recovering shopping center storefront while the Lakeview and Broadmoor branches remained closed. It was the first of several temporary branches funded by the Gates Foundation. The Mid-City branch relocated to the American Can Factory Building at 3700 Orleans Avenue 14 February 2011. A new location at 4140 Canal Street opened 13 December 2016 in the former Automotive Life Insurance Co. building which was built in 1963 and designed by Curtis & Davis Architects, the same firm that designed the Main Library on Loyola Avenue.
- Milton H. Latter Memorial Branch, 5120 St. Charles Avenue. Opened in 1948 in a mansion built in 1907. Former owner/residents included silent film star Marguerite Clark. Mr. and Mrs. Harry Latter purchased the home in 1948 to convert into a public library and memorial to their son who died at Okinawa during World War II. Some roof damage from Hurricane Katrina; reopened early 2006. The Latter branch was temporarily closed July 29-October 30, 2013 for extensive renovations and repairs, including new flooring, paint, and an expanded children's area.
- Nix Branch, 1401 S. Carrollton Avenue, Carrollton neighborhood. Opened in 1930. Katrina damage: broken windows on all sides; reopened 31 October 2005. It was damaged by a tornado on 13 February 2007, forcing a temporary closure for repair, and reopened the following month. It again temporarily closed 15 October 2016 for facility repairs and upgrades, including new floor plan, new paint, plaster repair, plumbing and electrical work, floor replacement, and new furniture, shelving, and lighting. The branch reopened 6 March 2017.
- Nora Navra Branch, 1902 St. Bernard Avenue. Opened in 1954. Major flooding in Hurricane Katrina; very little salvageable; closed indefinitely. New Orleans voters passed a property tax increase 2 May 2015 with a 75% Yes vote to increase funding for the library system. A portion of those funds is key to reopening the Nora Navra Branch. On 12 April 2016, the City Planning Commission voted 5–0 to recommend granting a conditional-use permit for a new branch, expected to cost $3 million. Construction scheduled to begin May 2017, with a groundbreaking held 7 March 2017.
- Norman Mayer (Gentilly) Branch, 2098 Foy Street, Gentilly neighborhood. Opened in 1949. Major flooding in Hurricane Katrina; building was demolished. During construction of a new branch library at the same location a temporary branch library was housed in a nearby strip mall at 2077 Caton Street. New library building opened in spring 2012.
- Robert E. Smith Regional Branch, 6301 Canal Boulevard, Lakeview neighborhood. The original branch at this location opened in 1956; in 1979 it was replaced by a larger building. Interior of first floor completely destroyed by Katrina flooding. After being served by a bookmobile parked in front of building for a few years, a temporary branch in trailer 2 blocks down Harrison Avenue opened in 2008, and the building was demolished in 2009. The new library opened in spring 2012.
- Rosa Keller Branch, 4300 S. Broad Street, Broadmoor neighborhood. Opened in 1993 in a 1918 residence. Named for Rosa Keller, the first woman appointed to the Public Library Board of Directors in 1953, a position she held for 26 years. In 1954, she was credited with the desegregation of the New Orleans Public Libraries. Major flooding in Hurricane Katrina; wood floors buckled; mold. For 5 years the branch was housed temporarily in a modular building. The historic Keller home was restored now operates as a community center. The 1990s addition was torn down and was replaced by a LEED certified addition to house the library and computer center. The renovation and expansion is being funded, in part, by a $2 million grant secured by the Broadmoor Improvement Association. The new library and community center, including a café, opened in March 2012.

== City Archives of New Orleans ==
The City Archives of New Orleans date to 1769 and the Spanish established official archives in 1773. The archives have been held by the New Orleans Public Library since 1947. The archives include court documents, maps, newspapers, and photographs. The archives are part of the "City Archives & Special Collections". The city's archivists have written about the city's mayors and newspapers. A blog and Facebook page provide updates on the archives. It also has a YouTube channel. The City Archives have hosted exhibitions performances, and speakers. In the 1980s city records were transferred to microfilm.

In 1871 City Ordinance 1035 AS established a keeper of the City Archives whose duties included allowing "no book, paper or archives of any kind to be taken thence, except upon the order of the Mayor, with due receipt being taken therefor showing description of the article so temporarily withdrawn." In 1904 documents were loaned for the Louisiana Purchase Exposition. In 1946 documents were transferred from City Hall to the Howard Annex of the New Orleans Public Library.In 1961 they were moved to the newly built main library.

In 1976 the City Archives published a Property Guide to assist residents with information on property histories. In 1989 a Genealogy Guide was published by the archives staff. The Guide to the Early Records (1760-1861) in the New Orleans City Archives Collection was published in 1992.

Mrs. E. D. Friedrichs was Custodian of the Archives in 1938. She was assisted by Marie Clark. E. D. Friedrichs A.M. M.D. E.D. was a physiologist and hygienist. She wrote and helped compile "Administrations of the Mayors of New Orleans, 1803-1936" with biographical sketches of the Mayors of New Orleans, a W.P.A. project. E. D. Friedrichs was the son of dentist George J. Friedrichs who was killed when he was hit by trolley in New Orleans and trapped under it.

Charles F. Youngman was an archivist in the City of New Orleans Archives who wrote about the city's historical newspapers. His "sketches" of newspapers are held in the New Orleans City Archives.

== Archive holdings ==
The archives include:

=== Charles F. Youngman's "sketches" of the city's newspapers ===
- Historic Sketch of The Daily Tropic from October 3, 1842 to April 17, 1847 (1938)
- Historic Sketch of The Daily True Delta from November 18, 1849 to March 30, 1866 (1938)
- Historic Sketch of The Louisiana Gazette, Etc: Louisiana State Gazette from July 25, 1804 to November 30, 1826 (1938)
- Historic Sketch of The Daily Crescent and New Orleans Daily Crescent: From March 5, 1848 to April 20, 1869 (1938)
- Historic Sketch of New Orleans Commercial Bulletin; November, 1832-December, 1871 (1938)
- Historic Sketch of Le Courrier de la Louisiane Or The Courrier from October 14, 1807 to November 24, 1860
- Historic Sketch of L'Ami Des Lois, Or The Friend of the Laws from November 18, 1809 to January 31, 1835
- Historic Sketches of The Daily Delta and New Orleans Daily Delta and The Era and The New Orleans Daily Independent from Oct. 12, 1845 to Jan. 19, 1865
- Historic Sketch of L'Abeille Or The New Orleans Bee from September, 1827 to December, 1923
- Historic Sketch of The True American from May 4th.,?, 1835 to October, 1842? (1939)

== See also ==
- History of New Orleans
- New Orleans Public Schools
- List of newspapers in Louisiana
- Timeline of New Orleans
