= Devlin Fieldhouse =

Arena in New Orleans, Louisiana, USA

Avron B. Fogelman Arena in Devlin Fieldhouse
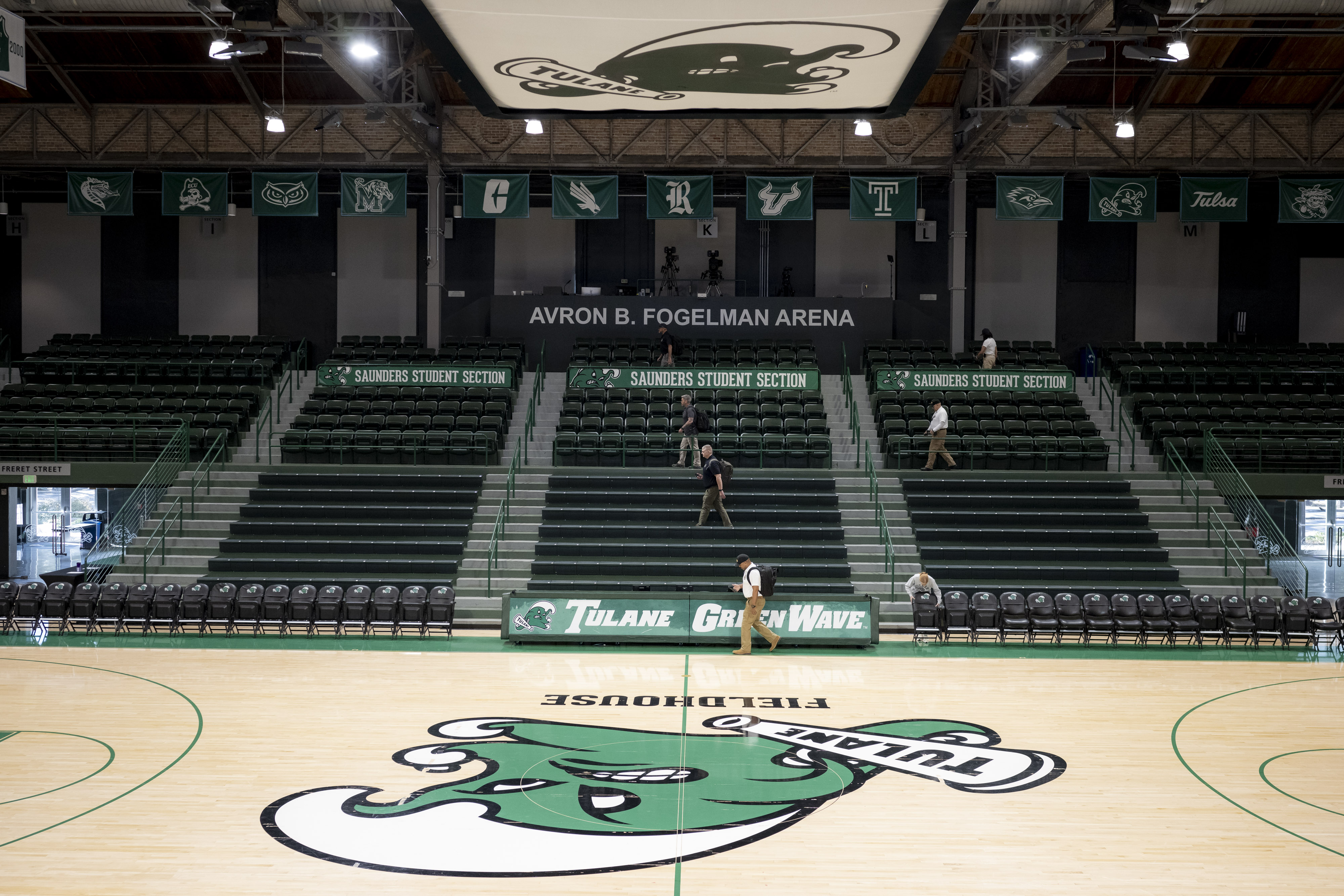
- Devlin Fieldhouse in February 2025.
- Interactive map of Avron B. Fogelman Arena in Devlin Fieldhouse
- Former names: Tulane Gym (1933–1988); Avron B. Fogelman Arena (1988–2012)
- Location: McAlister Place at Freret Street; New Orleans, LA 70118
- Coordinates: 29°56′19″N 90°07′14″W
- Operator: Tulane University
- Capacity: 4,100
- Surface: Hardwood

Construction
- Groundbreaking: 1931
- Opened: October 15, 1933
- Renovated: 1988, 2012
- Cost: $211,403 ($5.26 million in 2025 dollars)
- Architects: Armstrong & Koch; Burk, Lebreton, & Lamantia (renovations)

Tenants
- Tulane Green Wave (NCAA) 1933–present New Orleans Buccaneers (ABA) 1969–1970

Website
- Avron B. Fogelman Arena in Devlin Fieldhouse

Avron B. Fogelman Arena in Devlin Fieldhouse is a 4,100-seat, multi-purpose arena built in 1933 on Tulane University's Uptown campus in New Orleans, Louisiana. Since its opening, it has been home to the Tulane Green Wave men's and women's basketball teams and the women's volleyball team. Devlin is the 9th-oldest continuously active basketball venue in the nation.

== Tulane Gym and Fogelman Arena eras ==
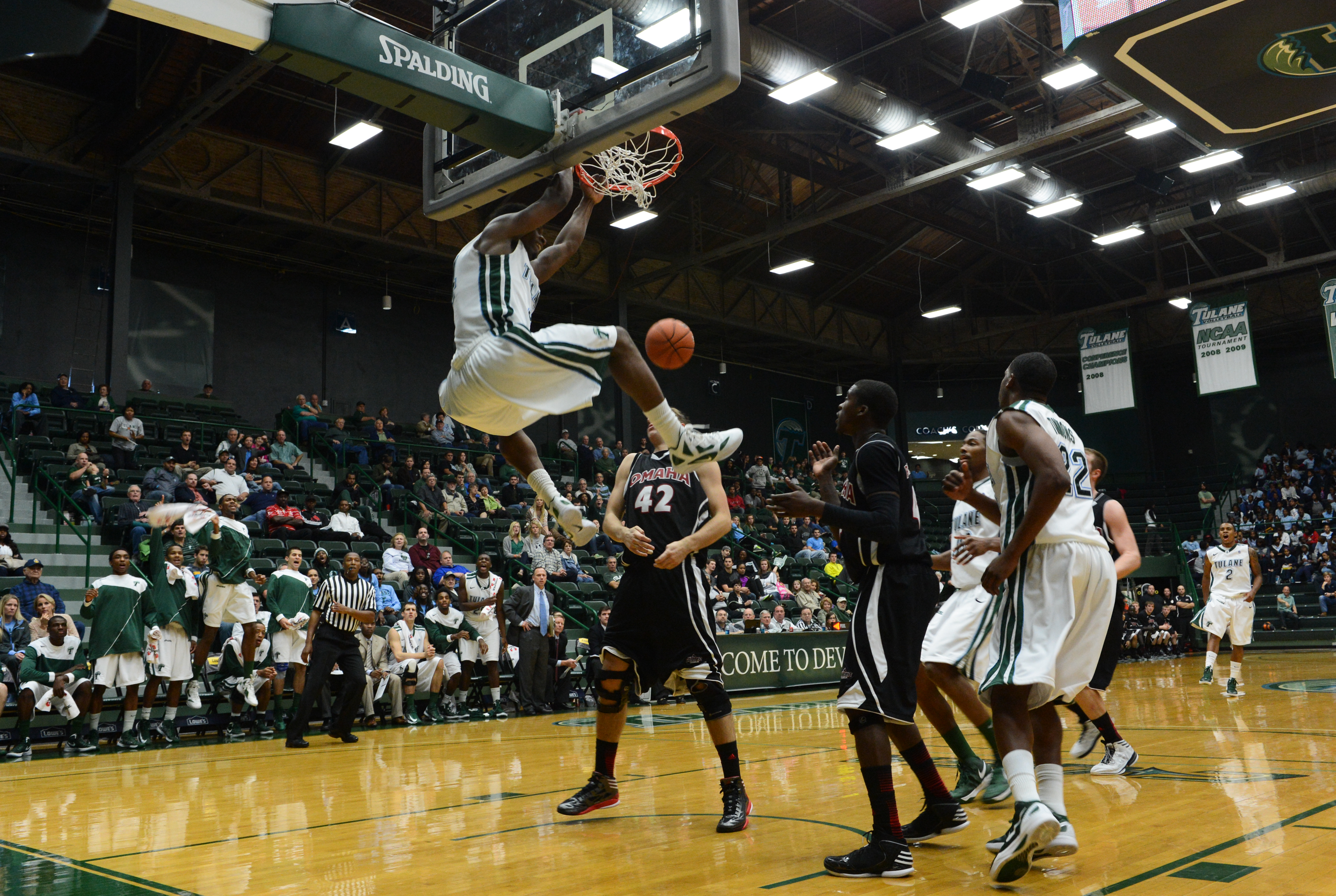
Men's basketball at Avron B. Fogelman Arena in Devlin Fieldhouse

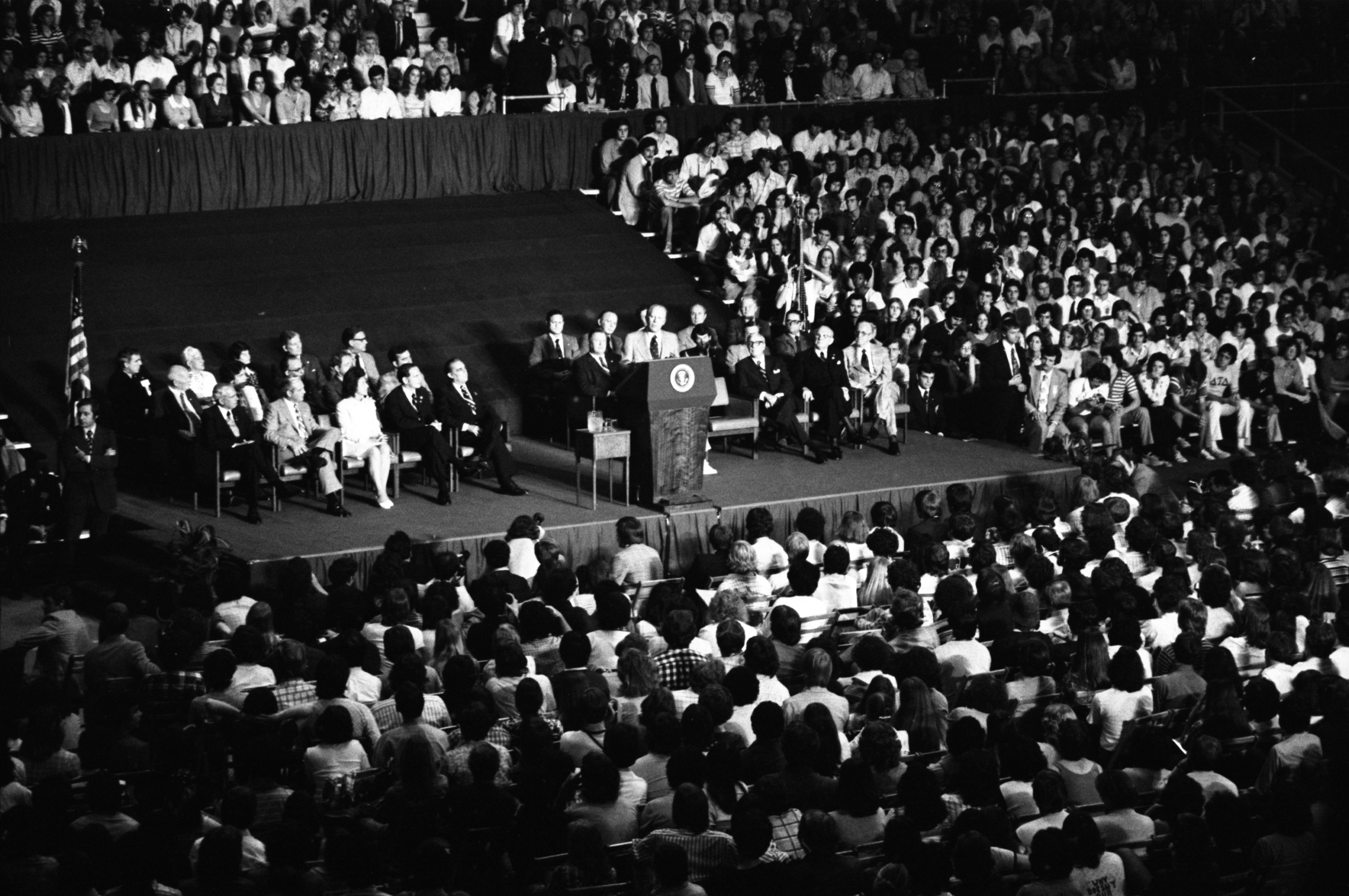
President Gerald R. Ford delivers remarks in the Tulane University Field House during a Tulane University Convocation Ceremony

Construction of Tulane Gym began in 1931 with funds earned from the football team's appearance in the 1932 Rose Bowl, and as a result it was known for many years around campus as "Rose Bowl Gym." The gym was the site of the 1942 NCAA basketball tournament East Regional games, won by the Dartmouth Indians. The Tulane Boxing team held matches in the gymnasium. During World War II, the building housed V-12 students, and in 1975 it was the site of President Gerald Ford's speech announcing the end of US involvement in the Vietnam War.

In 1969 and 1970, the gym was home to the New Orleans Buccaneers of the American Basketball Association.

In 1988 the university embarked on the first extensive remodel and refurbishment of the 55-year-old structure, timed to coincide with the return of the men's basketball program from its four-season dormancy in the wake of a point shaving scandal involving future NBA player John "Hot Rod" Williams. In 1989, the remodeled building was renamed "Avron B. Fogelman Arena" in honor of Memphis businessman and Tulane alumnus Avron Fogelman, whose donations funded the project. Fogelman Arena played host to the Conference USA women's basketball tournament in 1999 and 2009. In 2008 Barack Obama spoke to a capacity crowd in Fogelman as part of his campaign for the Democratic nomination for president.

== Devlin Fieldhouse era ==
Women's basketball after 2012 interior renovations at Avron B. Fogelman Arena in Devlin Fieldhouse

Immediately after the 2011–12 basketball season, Tulane embarked on a major, two-phase renovation of the arena with funds provided by longtime supporters Bob and Kate Devlin, whose names were added to the arena. Phase one, including new lighting, ticket booths, chair-back seats, concrete supports, contoured bench seating, concessions, team shop, and club areas, was completed in time for the 2012–13 basketball season. The acoustical ceiling was removed to reveal the original red wood ceiling and steel structure. The newly renovated Fieldhouse opened on November 9, 2012, with a women's basketball game versus the Louisiana Tech Lady Techsters, a 66–59 victory for the Green Wave. Phase two was completed prior to the 2014 volleyball season. It increased the number of restrooms and rebuilt the visitor locker rooms, officials' locker room, and laundry facility. Work continued in 2015 with the installation of new energy-efficient windows and painting and other minor upgrades.

During the 2021–2022 season, Devlin Fieldhouse hosted the Loyola University New Orleans basketball teams while the Loyola basketball facility was being repaired from damage from Hurricane Ida. Both the men's and women's teams reached the NAIA tournament and the opening rounds were held at Devlin Fieldhouse with the Loyola men's team continuing on to win the NAIA championship.

== Gallery ==
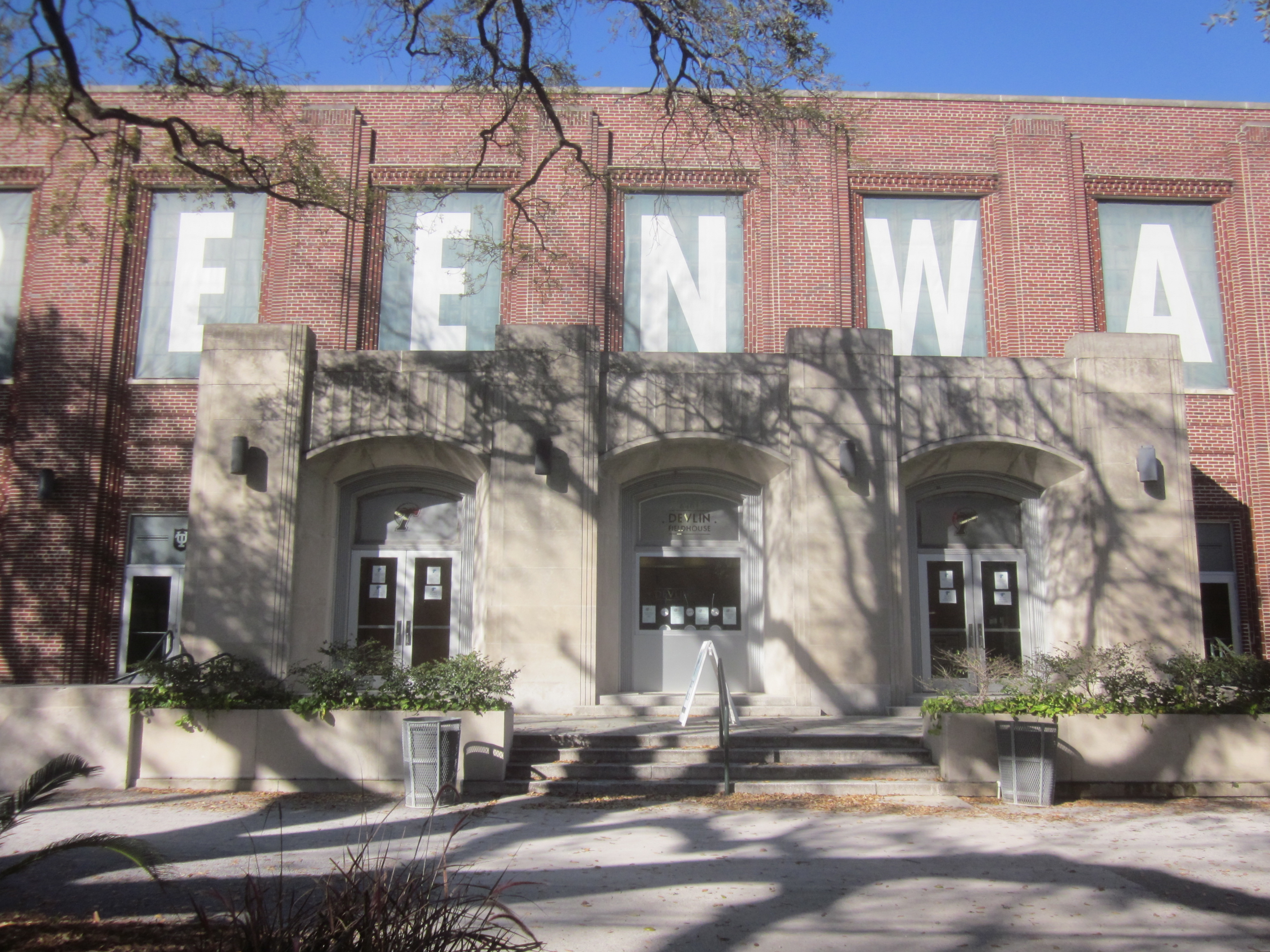
Devlin Fieldhouse - Main Entrance

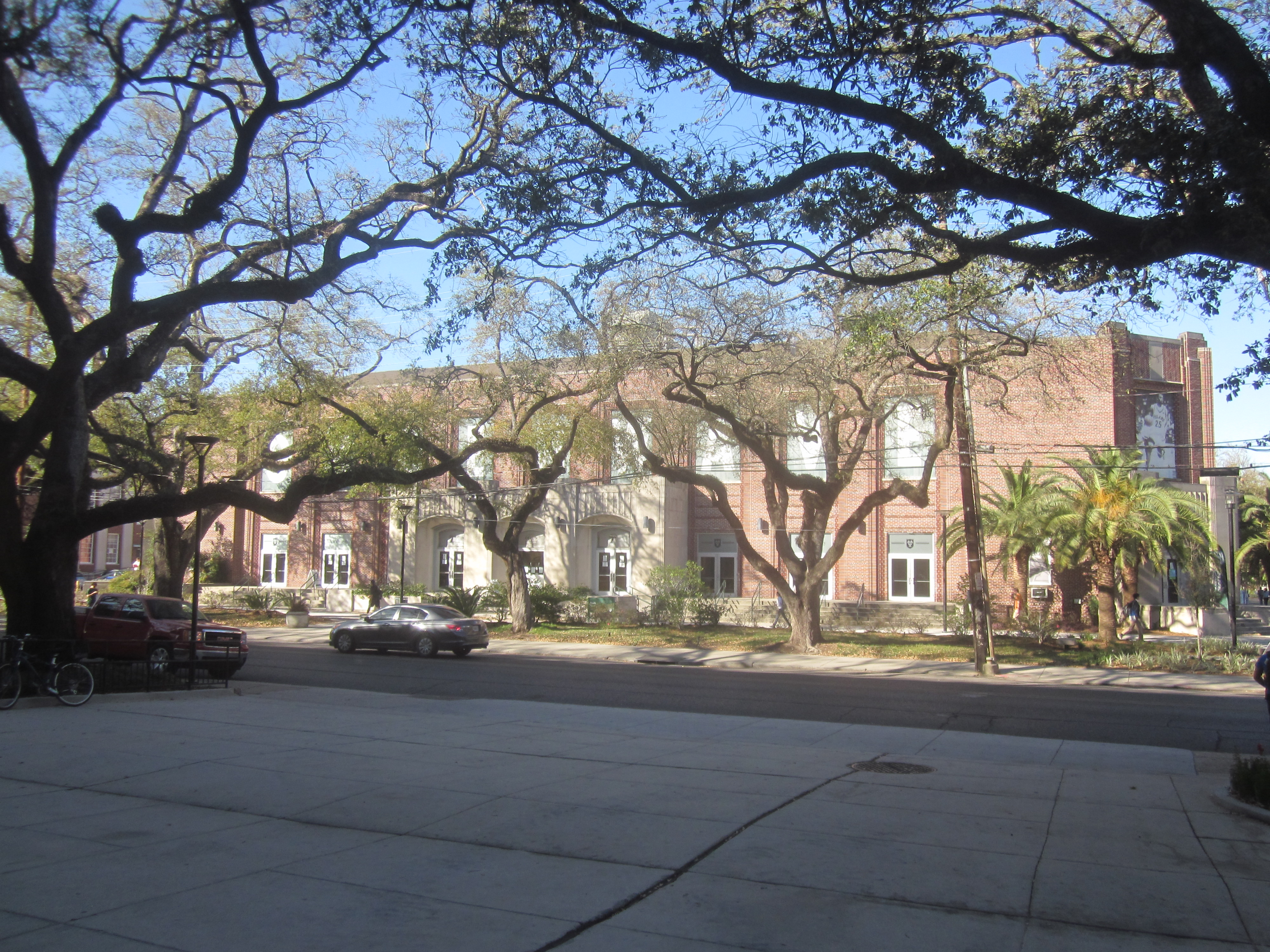
Devlin Fieldhouse - Freret St.

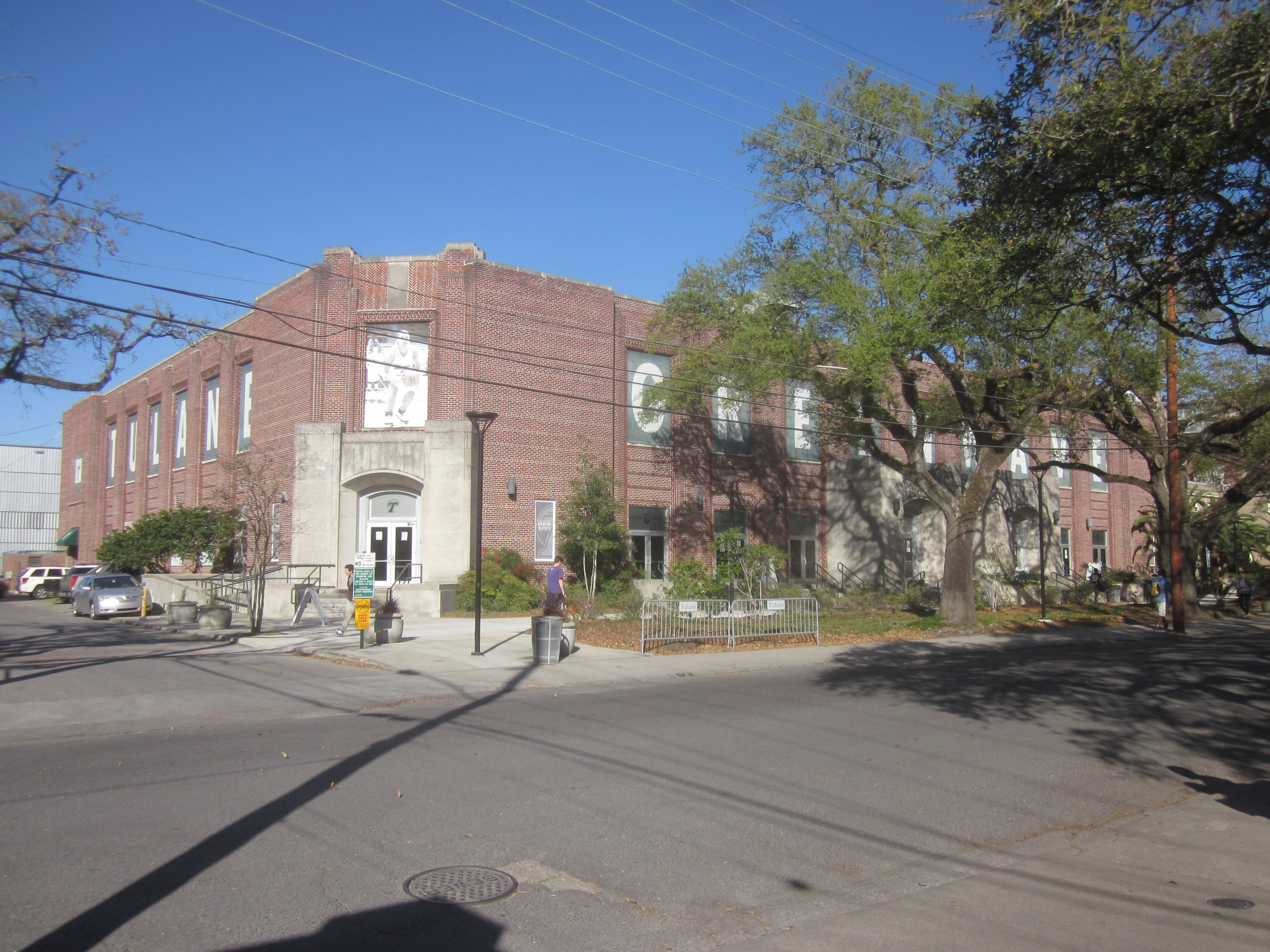
Devlin Fieldhouse - West Side Entrance

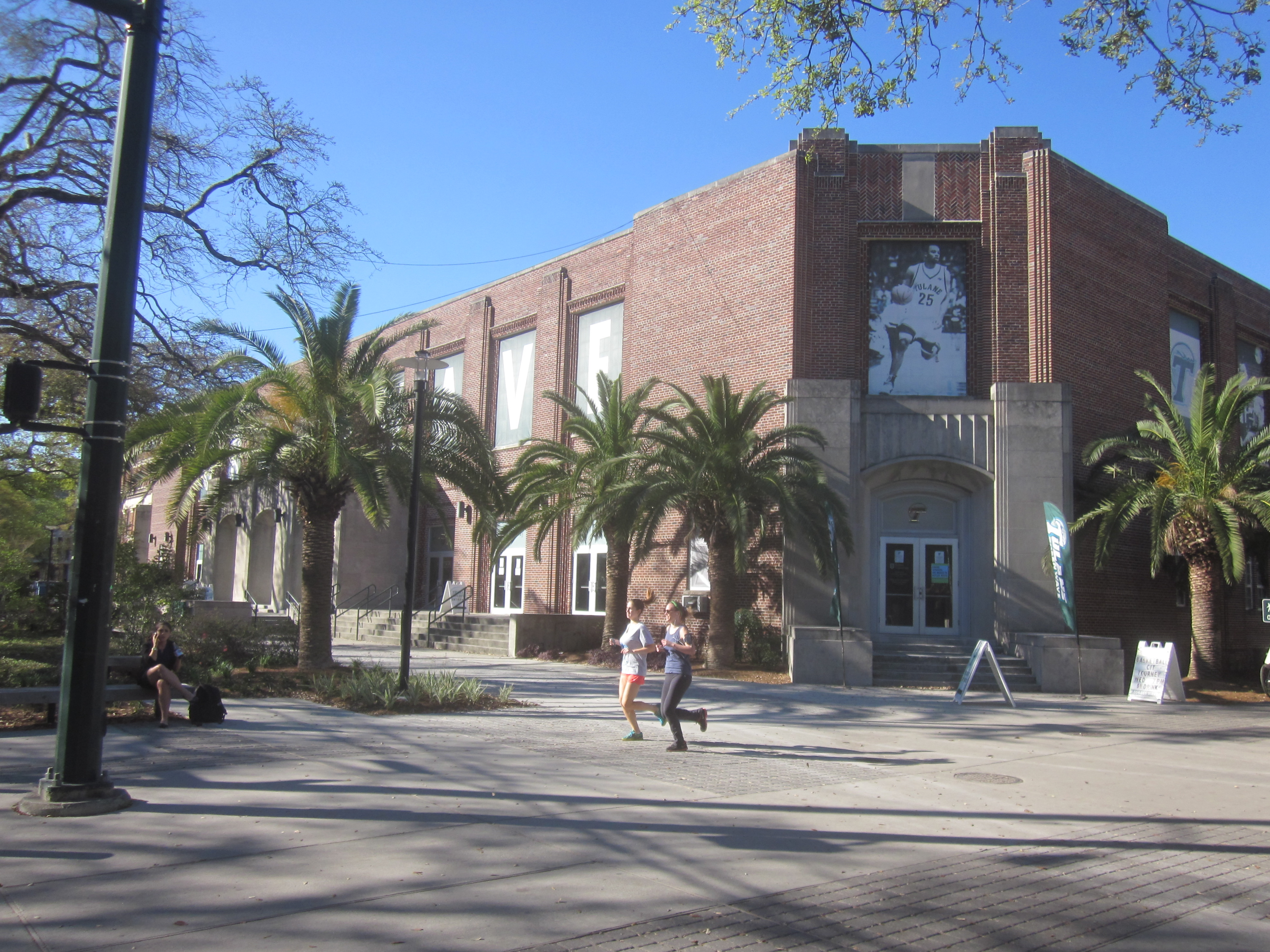
Devlin Fieldhouse - East Side Entrance

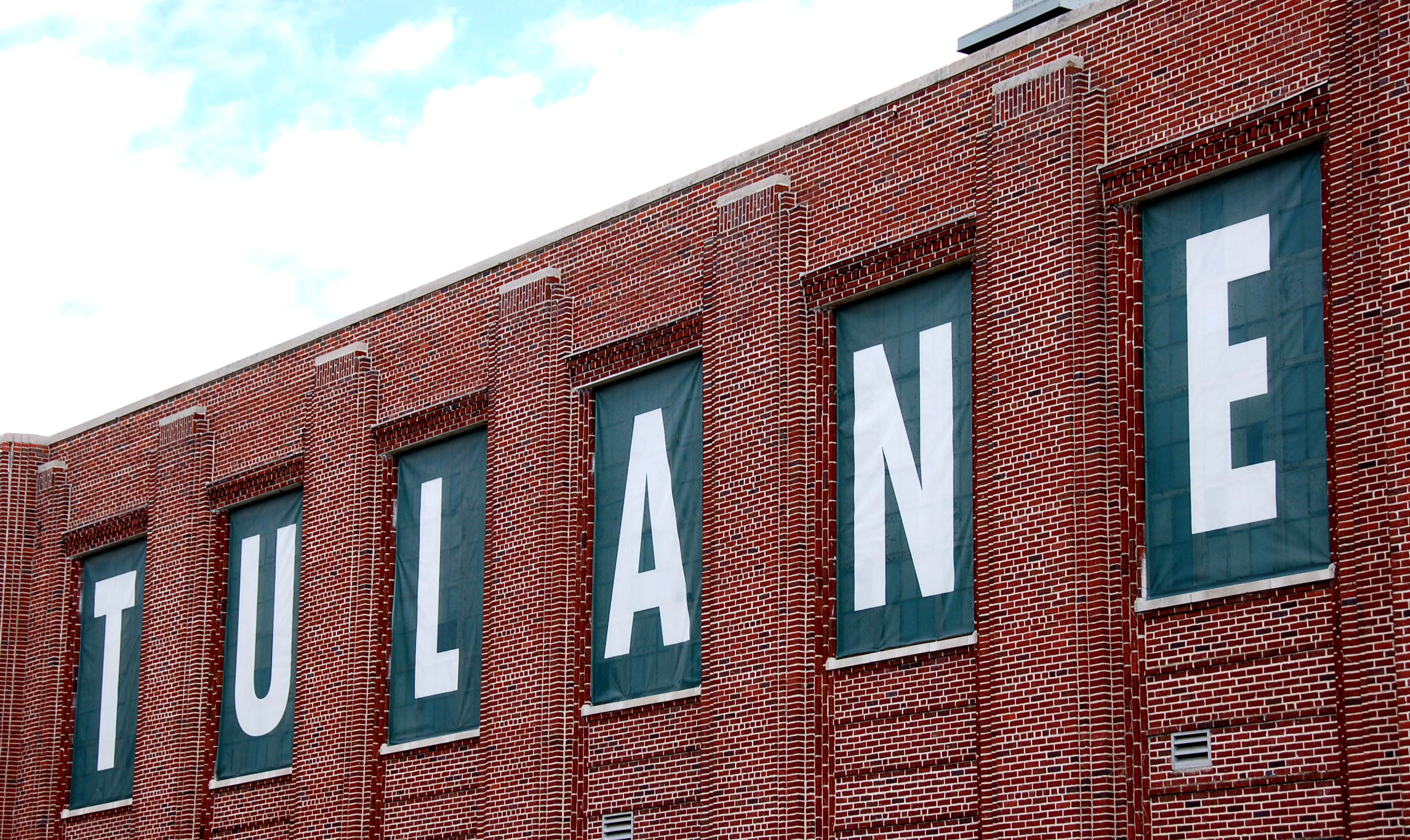
Devlin Fieldhouse - Tulane Lettering

== See also ==
- List of NCAA Division I basketball arenas
