= East Riverside, New Orleans =

East Riverside
- New Orleans Neighborhood
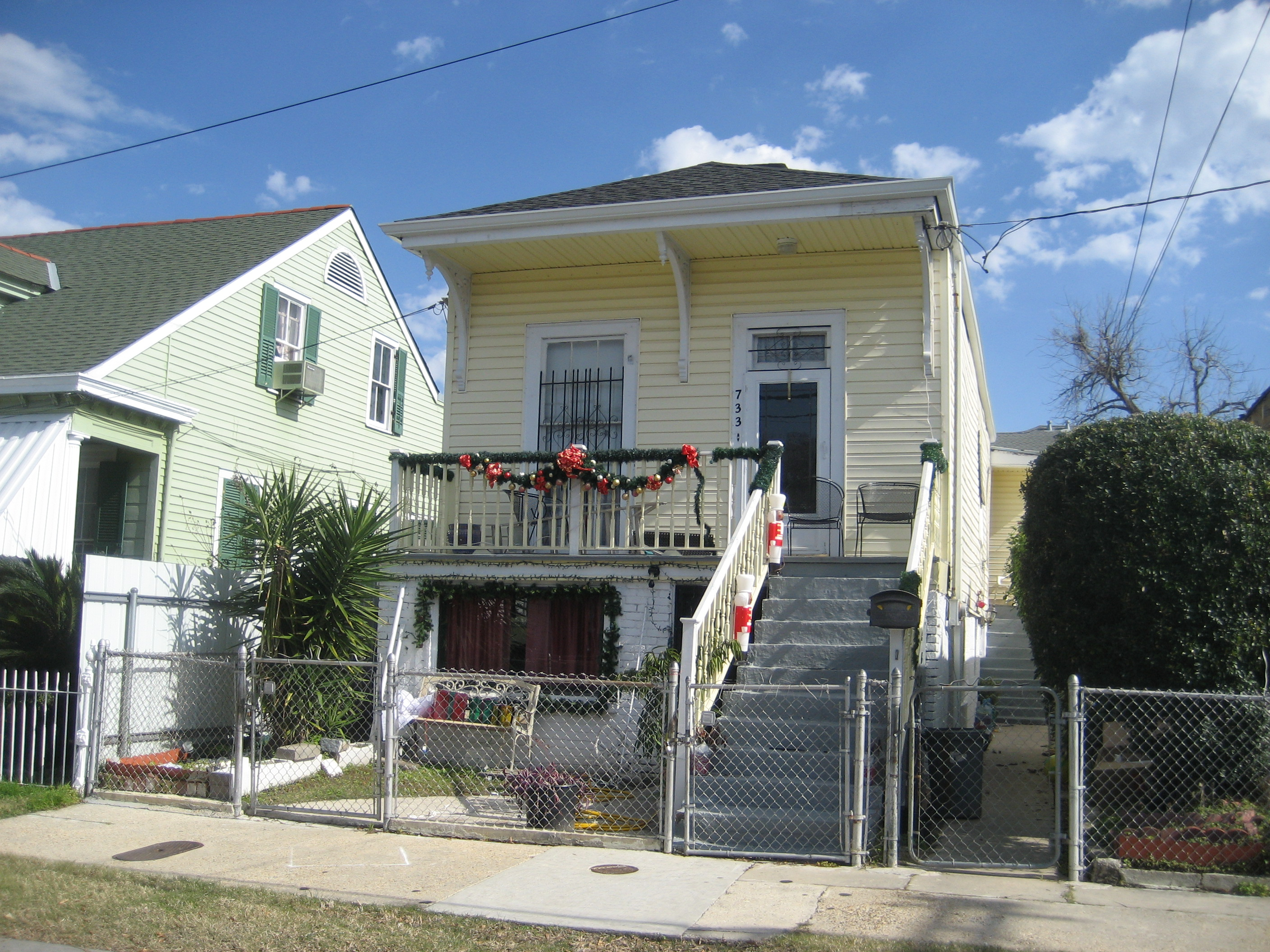
- "Raised shotgun" style house, 19th century residential architecture in the neighborhood
- Interactive map of East Riverside
- Coordinates: 29°55′10″N 90°05′40″W
- Country: United States
- State: Louisiana
- City: New Orleans
- Planning District: District 2, Central City/Garden District

Area
  - Total: 0.25 sq mi (0.65 km^{2})
  - Land: 0.25 sq mi (0.65 km^{2})
  - Water: 0.00 sq mi (0 km^{2})
- Elevation: 7 ft (2.1 m)

Population (2010)
  - Total: 1,474
  - Density: 5,900/sq mi (2,300/km^{2})
- Time zone: UTC-6 (CST)
  - Summer (DST): UTC-5 (CDT)
- Area code: 504

East Riverside is a neighborhood of the city of New Orleans. A subdistrict of the Central City/Garden District Area, its boundaries as defined by the City Planning Commission are: Magazine Street to the north, Toledano Street to the east, Tchoupitoulas Street to the south and Napoleon Avenue to the west.

== Geography ==
East Riverside is located at 29°55′10″N 90°05′40″W and has an elevation of 7 feet (2.1 m). According to the United States Census Bureau, the district has a total land area of 0.25 square miles (0.6 km^{2}), with no bodies of water.

=== Adjacent Neighborhoods ===
- Touro (north)
- Irish Channel (east & south)
- West Riverside (west)

== Demographics ==
As of the census of 2000, there were 3,220 people, 1,386 households, and 709 families residing in the neighborhood. The population density was 12,880 /mi^{2} (5,367 /km^{2}).

As of the census of 2010, there were 2,699 people, 1,324 households, and 600 families residing in the neighborhood.

== See also ==
- New Orleans neighborhoods
