= Broadmoor, New Orleans =

Broadmoor
- New Orleans Neighborhood
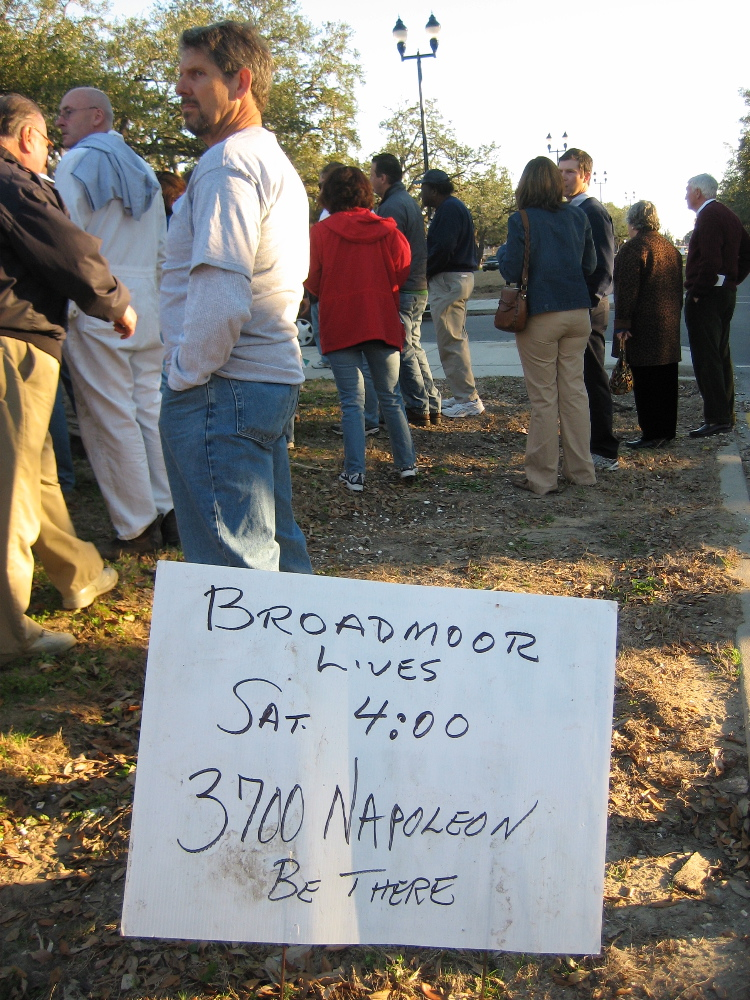
- Broadmoor Lives! Post Katrina rally
- Interactive map of Broadmoor
- Coordinates: 29°56′56″N 90°06′15″W
- Country: United States
- State: Louisiana
- City: New Orleans
- Planning District: District 3, Uptown/Carrollton

Area
  - Total: 0.56 sq mi (1.5 km^{2})
  - Land: 0.56 sq mi (1.5 km^{2})
  - Water: 0.00 sq mi (0 km^{2})
- Elevation: 2 ft (0.61 m)

Population (2010)
  - Total: 2,378
  - Density: 4,200/sq mi (1,600/km^{2})
- Time zone: UTC-6 (CST)
  - Summer (DST): UTC-5 (CDT)
- Area code: 504

- Broadmoor Historic District
- U.S. National Register of Historic Places
- U.S. Historic district
- Location within Louisiana Location within the United States
- Location: Roughly bounded by South Broad/Fountainebleau, Milan, S. Claiborne and Octavia, New Orleans, Louisiana (original); Roughly bounded by Walmsley, S. White, Eden, and S. Jefferson Davis Pkwy, (increase) New Orleans, Louisiana
- Coordinates: 29°56′48″N 90°6′22″W
- Architectural style: Bungalow/Craftsman, Colonial Revival, et al. (original); Colonial Revival, Bungalow/Craftsman (increase)
- NRHP reference No.: 03000519 and 07000940
- Added to NRHP: June 13, 2003 (original); September 13, 2007 (increase)

Broadmoor is a neighborhood of the city of New Orleans. A subdistrict of the Uptown/Carrollton Area, its boundaries as defined by the New Orleans City Planning Commission are: Eve Street to the north, Washington Avenue and Toledano Street to the east, South Claiborne Avenue to the south, and Jefferson Avenue, South Rocheblave Street, Nashville Avenue, and Octavia Street to the west. It includes the Broadmoor Historic District which was listed on the National Register of Historic Places in 2003 and increased in its boundaries in 2007.

== History ==
Broadmoor is low-lying ground in New Orleans, and was only substantially developed beginning in the early 20th century after improved drainage was initiated (see: Drainage in New Orleans). Before being developed, the area was a large marsh and was a fishing spot for Uptowners. Early construction were mostly high raised houses for fear of repeats of historic floods, but after decades with little problem more low lying residential structures were built in Broadmoor. The first area drainage canals were built in 1885. In 1903 a pumping station at Broad Street and Washington within the Broadmoor boundaries opened in 1903. In 1915, pumps more powerful than previous ones were established at that pumping station. After 1915, smaller groups of people began settling the area.

During the early 1920s a sharp population increase occurred in Broadmoor. Over one third of Broadmoor's houses and the Wilson School, the first public school in Broadmoor, were built during that decade. Population growth continued for several years In the late 1950s and the 1960s many people began moving to suburbs in Jefferson Parish and New Orleans East, leading to population losses for Broadmoor.

Broadmoor was hit hard by the May 8th 1995 Louisiana Flood, after which extensive improvements of drainage were constructed.

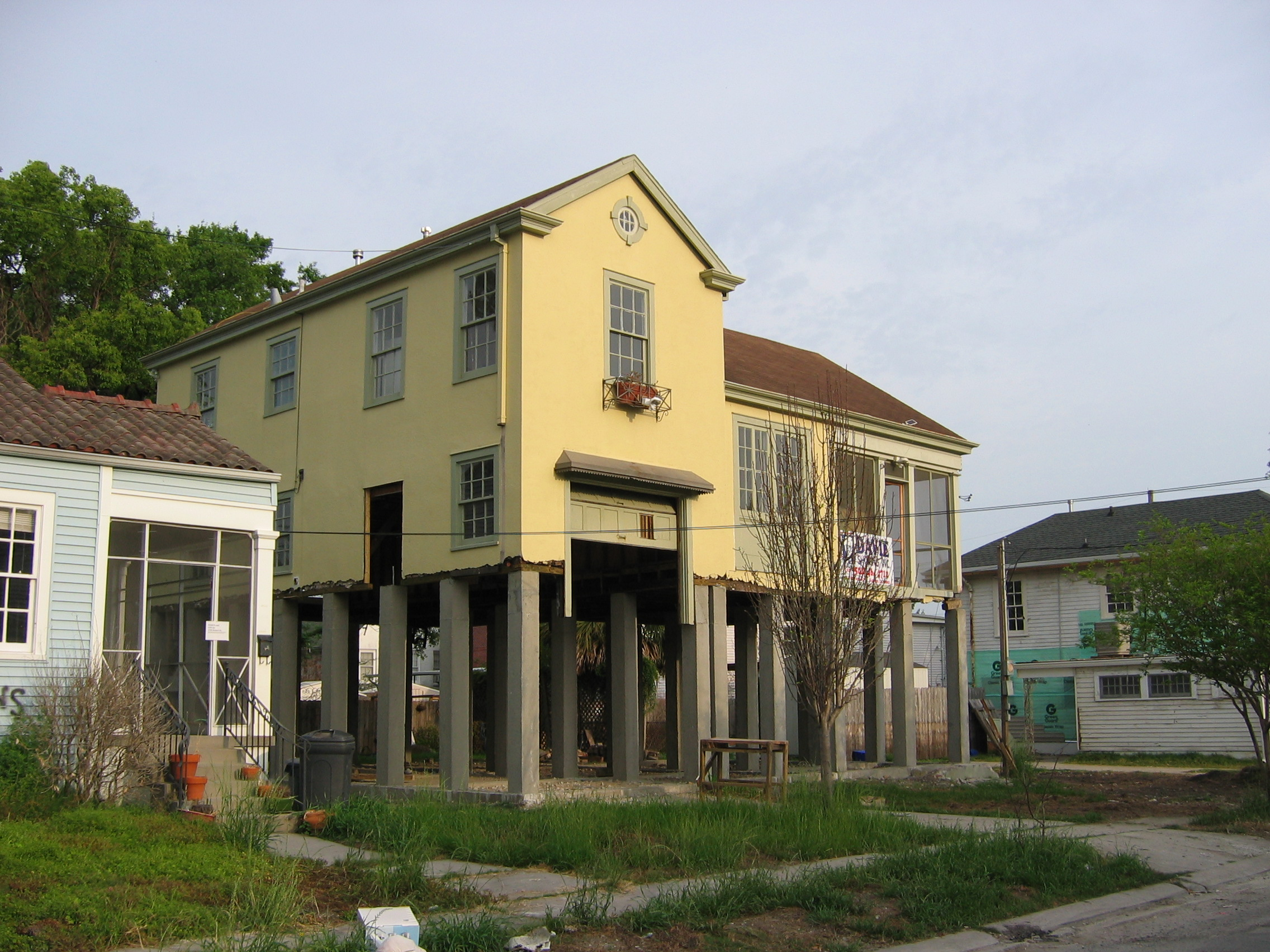
House in Broadmoor being raised up above the levels of the post-Katrina flooding

Broadmoor flooded badly in the aftermath of Hurricane Katrina in 2005. A Bring New Orleans Back Commission preliminary report map showed Broadmoor as a suggested area to be turned into park land; this suggestion is strongly objected to by residents, hundreds of whom were already back in their homes by January 2006, many living in the upstairs of two story homes while they worked on gutting and repairing their flooded ground floors.

In 2016, the National Register of Historic Places listed the neighborhood's vacant Gem Theater. Later that year, the restored building opened as a microbrewery.

== Geography ==
Broadmoor is located at 29°56′56″N 90°06′15″W and has an elevation of 2 feet (0.6 m). According to the United States Census Bureau, the district has a total area of 0.56 square miles (1.5 km^{2}). 0.56 square miles (1.5 km^{2}) of which is land and 0.00 square miles (0.0 km^{2}) (0.00%) of which is water.

It is in proximity to some of the wealthier communities in New Orleans, such as Uptown and the Garden District. It is also in proximity to Claiborne Avenue, the street connecting Downtown New Orleans with Jefferson Parish.

=== Adjacent Neighborhoods ===
- Gert Town (north)
- Central City (east)
- Milan (south)
- Freret (south)
- Marlyville/Fontainebleau (west)

=== Boundaries ===
The New Orleans City Planning Commission defines the boundaries of Broadmoor as these streets: Eve Street, Washington Avenue, Toledano Street, South Claiborne Avenue, Jefferson Avenue, South Rocheblave Street, Nashville Avenue, and Octavia Street.

== Demographics ==
As of the census of 2000, there were 7,232 people, 2,915 households, and 1,788 families residing in the neighborhood. The population density was 12,914 /mi² (4,986 /km^{2}). The racial makeup of the neighborhood was 68.2% African American, 25.8% White, 0.6% Asian, 0.2% Native American, 0.2% from other races, and 1.3% from two or more races. Hispanic or Latino of any race were 3.7% of the population.

As of the census of 2010, there were 5,381 people, 2,203 households, and 1,275 families residing in the neighborhood. The racial makeup of the neighborhood was 61.1% African American, 28.8% White, 1.0% Asian, 0.3% Native American, 0.4% from other races, and 1.6% from two or more races. Hispanic or Latino of any race were 6.7% of the population.

== Education ==
=== Primary and secondary schools ===
Orleans Parish School Board (OPSB) a.k.a. New Orleans Public Schools (NOPS) and the Recovery School District (RSD) operate and charter public schools.

Andrew Wilson Elementary School is located in Broadmoor. Wilson, the first public school in Broadmoor, was built in 1922. Larry Abramson of National Public Radio said "This once-grand edifice was neglected before [Hurricane Katrina], and as a school it was not known for high achievement." Hurricane Katrina in 2005 caused flooding in the school's lower level. The building was abandoned for several months, and Abramson said it was "crumbling". Wilson Elementary moved to a temporary location several miles from the original school. Broadmoor Improvement Association opposed a proposal among New Orleans city leaders to raze the school building and convert it into green space. LaToya Cantrell, an activist, proposed restoring the school. Area activists convinced authorities at the federal, state, and local levels to fund a $30 million renovation and addition. Wilson Elementary was scheduled to reopen on January 4, 2010. Abramson said "They turned the stately but tired building into a dream of a school — light-filled, high tech, souped up with all sorts of eco-friendly features."

=== Public libraries ===
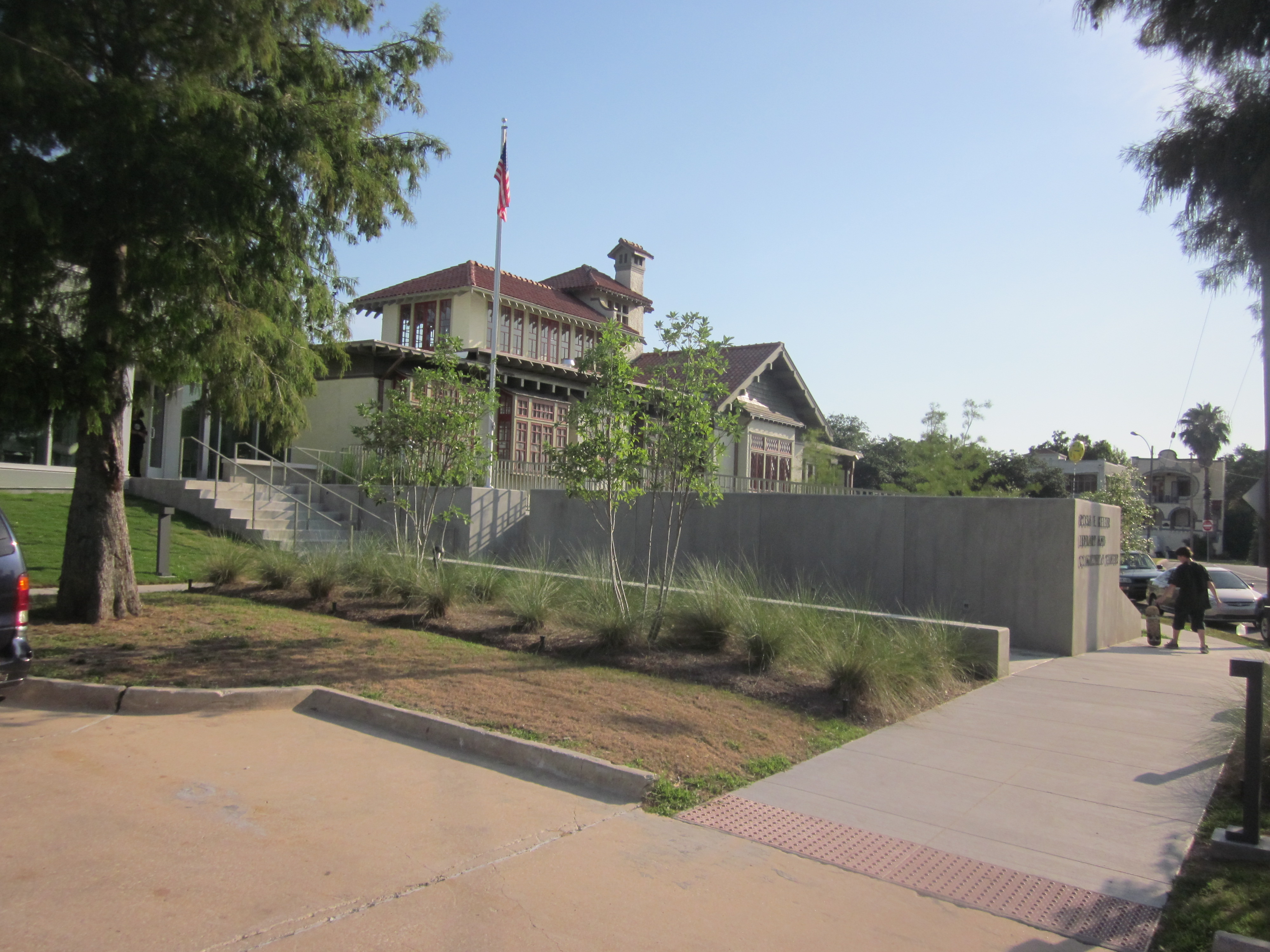
Rosa F. Keller Library and Community Center

The Rosa F. Keller Library and Community Center of the New Orleans Public Library is in Broadmoor. It was rebuilt after Hurricane Katrina, and had its grand opening on March 16, 2012. The Keller site consists of the modernized library building and the 1918 Hardie-Fattel house, a historic house attached to the library which serves as a community center.

The renovated house portion includes classrooms, meeting rooms, a teaching kitchen and a coffee shop. Outside are an outdoor reading garden, a terrace along Napoleon Avenue that has chairs and umbrellas, and a water garden along Broad Street. The restoration of the Keller site was partially financed by a $2 million grant from the Carnegie Corporation. The architecture firm Eskew+Dumez+Ripple was selected for the restoration.

== Notable residents ==
Broadmoor resident musician and producer Dave Bartholomew named his Broadmoor Records label after the neighborhood.

Poppy Z. Brite writer.

Walter Isaacson, American writer, biographer, and philanthropist.

David Ferrie once lived on Louisiana Avenue Parkway.

Broadmoor has been the home of three mayors of New Orleans, Moon Landrieu, Mitch Landrieu, and Latoya Cantrell.

== See also ==
- Neighborhoods in New Orleans
