= West Riverside, New Orleans =

West Riverside
- New Orleans Neighborhood
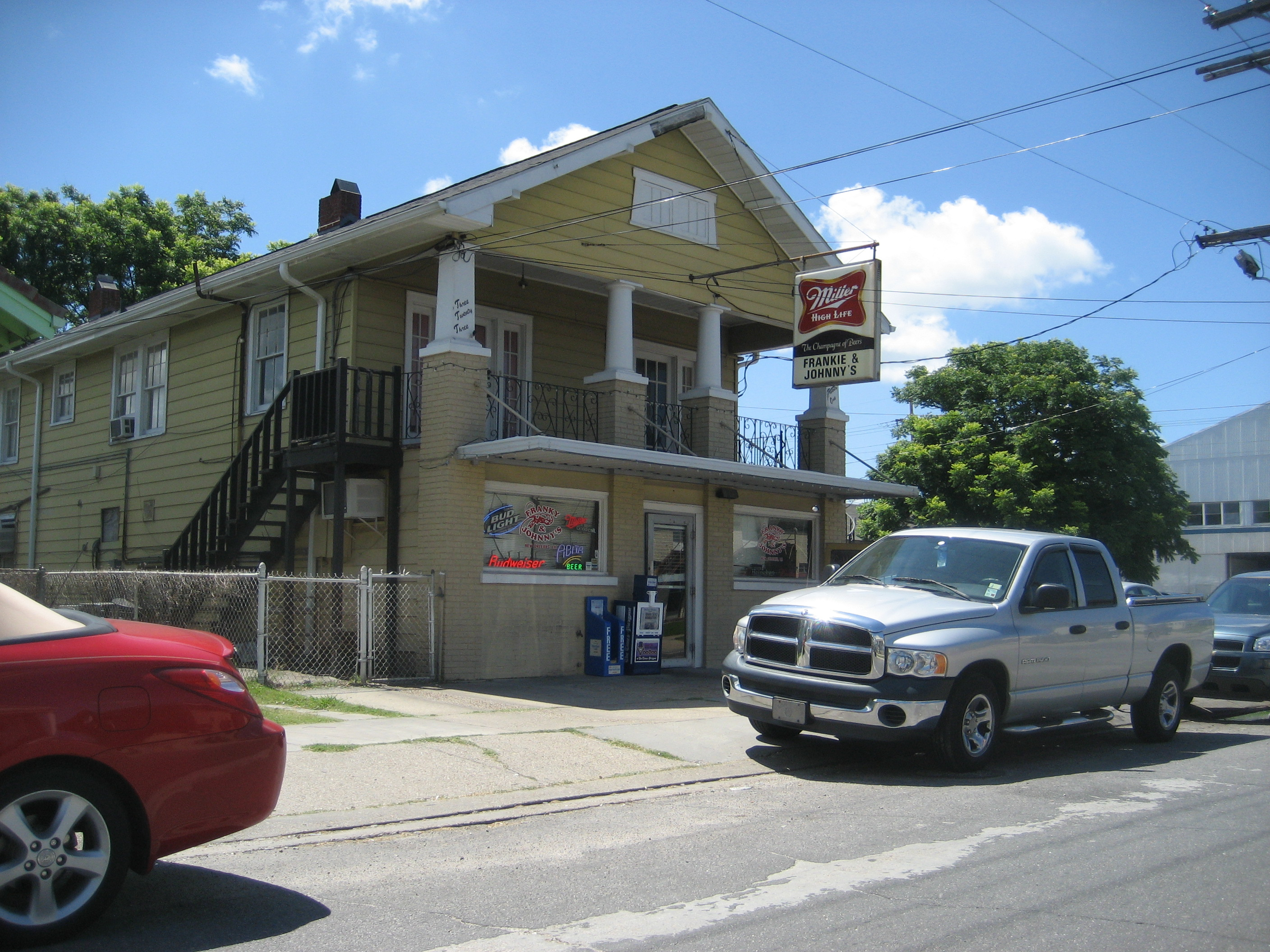
- Neighborhood restaurant
- Interactive map of West Riverside
- Coordinates: 29°54′59″N 90°06′52″W
- Country: United States
- State: Louisiana
- City: New Orleans
- Planning District: District 3, Uptown/Carrollton

Area
  - Total: 1.33 sq mi (3.4 km^{2})
  - Land: 0.94 sq mi (2.4 km^{2})
  - Water: 0.39 sq mi (1.0 km^{2})
- Elevation: 10 ft (3.0 m)

Population (2010)
  - Total: 2,706
  - Density: 2,900/sq mi (1,100/km^{2})
- Time zone: UTC-6 (CST)
  - Summer (DST): UTC-5 (CDT)
- Area code: 504

West Riverside is a neighborhood of the city of New Orleans. A subdistrict of the Uptown/Carrollton Area, its boundaries as defined by the New Orleans City Planning Commission are: Magazine Street to the north, Napoleon Avenue to the east, the Mississippi River to the south and Exposition, Tchoupitoulas and Webster Streets to the west. This has not traditionally been a separate neighborhood as most of this area has been considered part of Uptown New Orleans throughout most of its history. This name was only artificially created by the New Orleans City Planning Commission and most residents do not identify with it.

== Geography ==
West Riverside is located at 29°54′59″N 90°06′52″W and has an elevation of 10 feet (3.0 m). According to the United States Census Bureau, the district has a total area of 1.33 square miles (3.4 km^{2}). 0.94 square miles (2.4 km^{2}) of which is land and 0.39 square miles (1.0 km^{2}) (29.32%) of which is water.

=== Adjacent Neighborhoods ===
- Uptown (north)
- East Riverside (east)
- Irish Channel (east)
- Mississippi River (south)
- Audubon (northwest)

== Demographics ==
As of the census of 2000, there were 5,232 people, 2,635 households, and 1,126 families residing in the neighborhood. The population density was 5,566 /mi^{2} (2,180 /km^{2}).

As of the census of 2010, there were 4,747 people, 2,493 households, and 1,015 families residing in the neighborhood.

== See also ==
- New Orleans neighborhoods
