= Milan, New Orleans =

Milan
- New Orleans Neighborhood
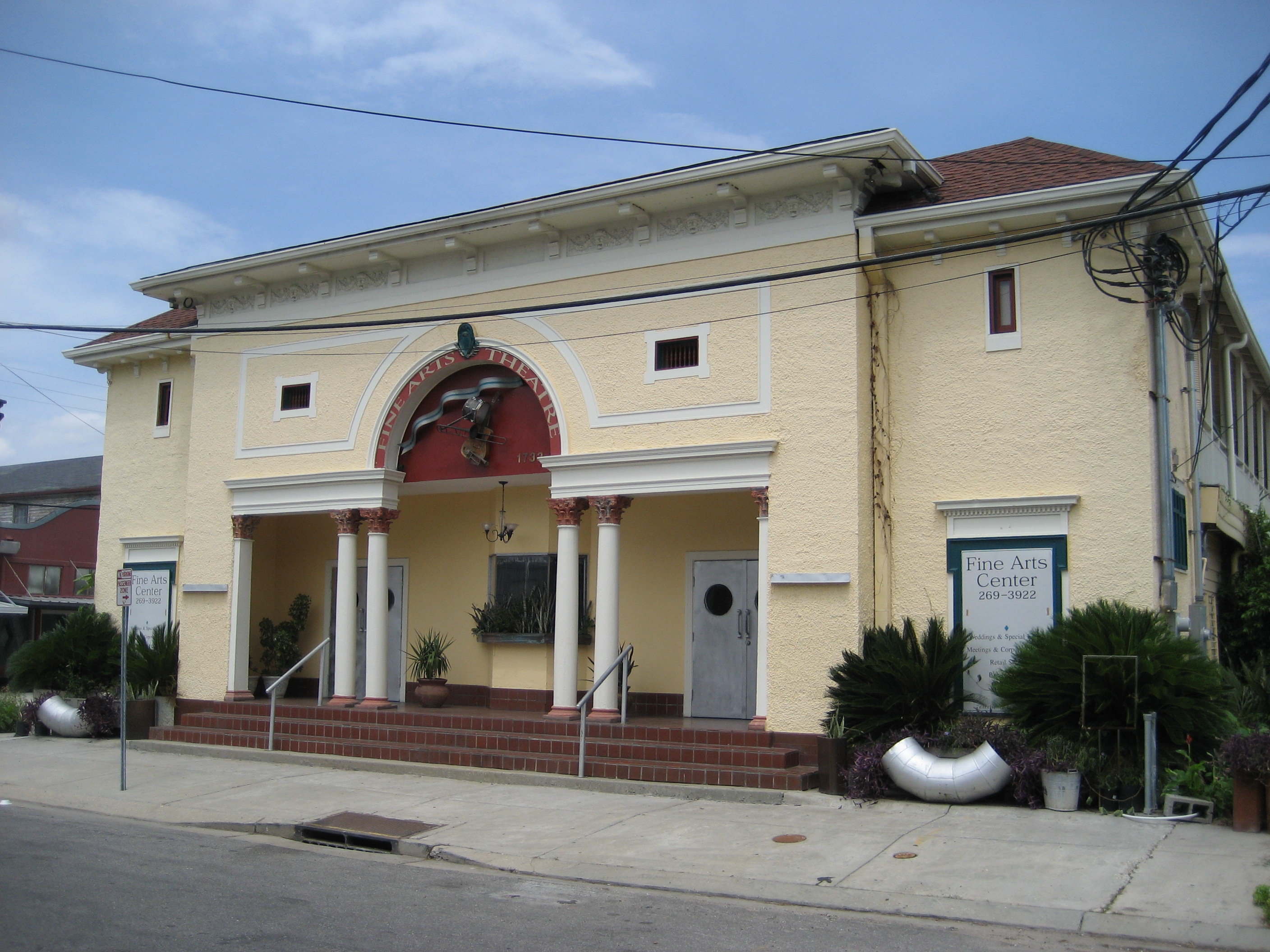
- "Fine Arts Theater" building in the Milan neighborhood
- Interactive map of Milan
- Coordinates: 29°55′59″N 90°05′50″W
- Country: United States
- State: Louisiana
- City: New Orleans, Louisiana
- Planning District: District 2, Central City/Garden District

Area
  - Total: 0.52 sq mi (1.3 km^{2})
  - Land: 0.52 sq mi (1.3 km^{2})
  - Water: 0.00 sq mi (0 km^{2})
- Elevation: 0 ft (0 m)

Population (2010)
  - Total: 2,835
  - Density: 5,500/sq mi (2,100/km^{2})
- Time zone: UTC-6 (CST)
  - Summer (DST): UTC-5 (CDT)
- Area code: 504

Milan is a neighborhood of the city of New Orleans, Louisiana, U.S.A. A sub-district of the Central City/Garden District Area, its boundaries as defined by the New Orleans City Planning Commission are: South Claiborne Avenue to the north, Toledano Street and Louisiana Avenue to the east, St. Charles Avenue to the south, and Napoleon Avenue to the west.

== Geography ==
Milan is located at 29°55′59″N 90°05′50″W and has an elevation of 0 feet (0.0 m). According to the United States Census Bureau, the district has a total area of 0.52 square miles (1.3 km^{2}). 0.52 square miles (1.3 km^{2}) of which is land and 0.00 square miles (0.0 km^{2}) (0.0%) of which is water.

=== Adjacent neighborhoods ===
- Broadmoor (north)
- Central City (east)
- Touro (south)
- Uptown (west)
- Freret (west)

=== Boundaries ===
The New Orleans City Planning Commission defines the boundaries of Milan as these streets: South Claiborne Avenue, Toledano Street, Louisiana Avenue, St. Charles Avenue, and Napoleon Avenue.

== Demographics ==
As of the census of 2000, there were 7,480 people, 3,175 households, and 1,693 families living in the neighborhood. The population density was 14,385 /mi^{2} (5,754 /km^{2}).

As of the census of 2010, there were 5,286 people, 2,372 households, and 1,118 families living in the neighborhood.

== See also ==
- Neighborhoods in New Orleans
- Milan, Italy
