= Simon of New Orleans =

French-born artist

Simon of New Orleans is a French-born artist who first moved to the United States of America in the late 1980s. In Louisiana he became known for his painted bright and colorful signs which can include distinguishing lettering, various animals, and slogans that include an assortment of French, English, and local New Orleans dialect. His style is often considered folk art or Haitian. He uses the term "deja vu art" to describe his work. His workshop today resides in New Orleans on Jackson Avenue at Magazine Street, behind his wife's Antiques on Jackson showroom.

== Biography ==
Simon Hardeveld was born in Cannes, France, on Saturday June 30, 1949 when the sun was high on the midday sky. His mother was French and his father was Dutch. Simon worked as a chef in France for 25 years. In 1981 he visited the United States and met his future wife Maria who ran a restaurant in Stuart, Florida. Soon after, they were married and ran three different restaurants together. In 1993, Simon visited New Orleans for Mardi Gras and ended up making the Crescent City his permanent home after he saw the colorful signs, buildings and placards to advertise food and drinks. He started to collaborate with Allain of Bush Antiques where he would restore French furniture. At this time Simon started to showcase some of his vividly colored paintings in the back of Elaine's shop. Bush Antiques customers would visit Simon's shed at the back of the store and order portraits and placards. Simon had started to accept commissions: huge street scenes, signs, pictures of people's pets, or lovers, a sort of Cajun naif style. Despite not having any formal art training, Simon sold his artwork at the Outsider Art Fair in Soho in January 1996.

In 2010, the vice president of a local New Orleans TV station commissioned Simon to design the set of one of their evening pieces after he ate at a restaurant that displays Simon's work. Simon considers this as his claim to fame. He has also completed a multitude of other commercial signage for the businesses in the city where his signs are instantly recognized. On August 20, 2016 the book "Simon of New Orleans". was published. About his life and art, the book describes how Simon draws inspiration from people he meets in New Orleans. It's not uncommon for him to up-cycle scraps of metal and other previously used material to use in his art.

Simon loves to work outdoors all year round. His workshop, made up of a number of shacks that he built from debris from the 2005 Katrina hurricane, is situated in the back of his wife Maria's Antiques on Jackson Italian and French antiques and vintage showroom.
