= Uptown, New Orleans =

Uptown
- New Orleans Neighborhood
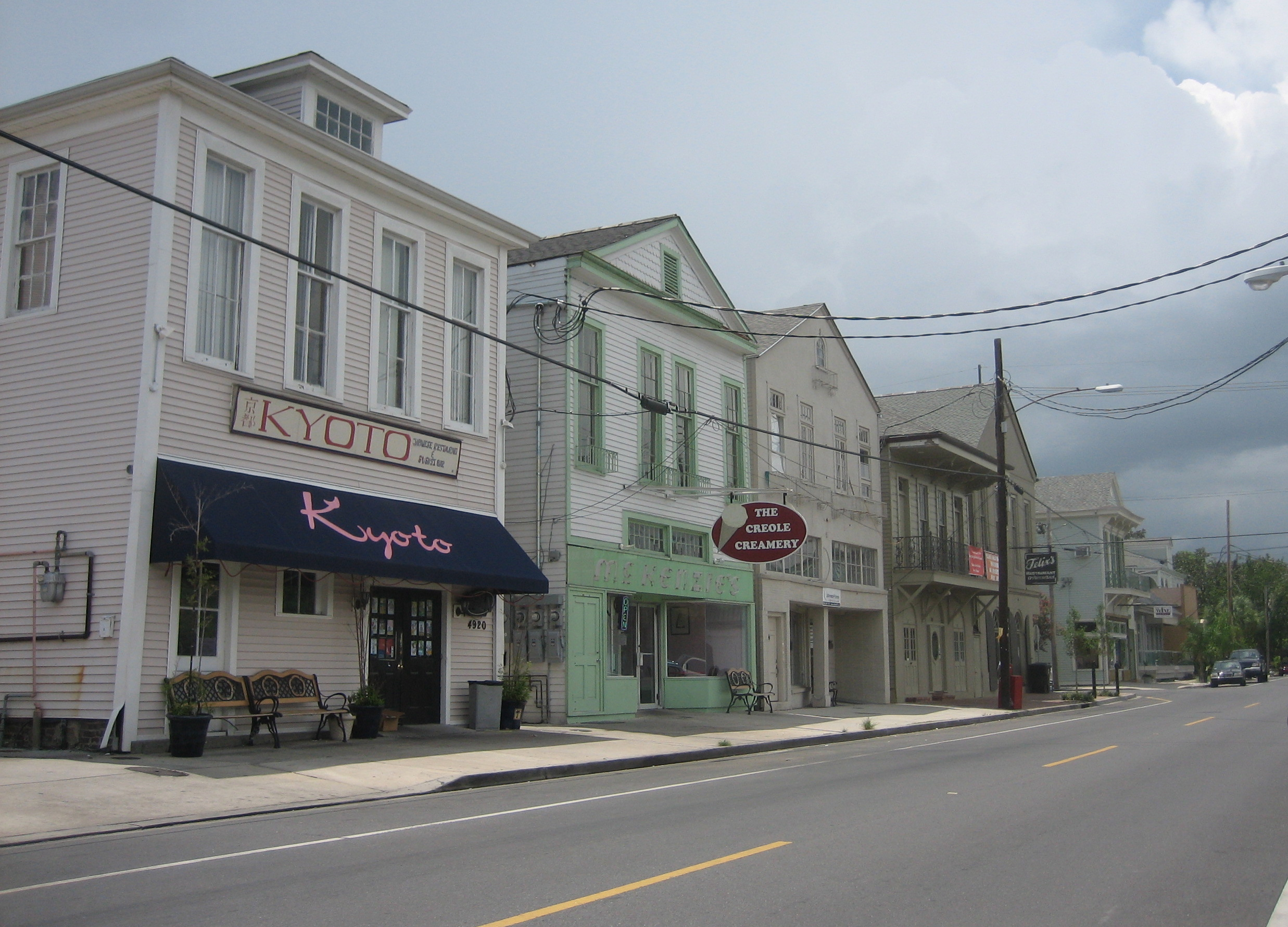
- Local businesses on Prytania Street
- Interactive map of Uptown
- Coordinates: 29°55′34″N 90°06′28″W
- Country: United States
- State: Louisiana
- City: New Orleans
- Planning District: District 3, Uptown/Carrollton

Area
  - Total: 0.64 sq mi (1.7 km^{2})
  - Land: 0.64 sq mi (1.7 km^{2})
  - Water: 0.00 sq mi (0 km^{2})
- Elevation: 2 ft (0.61 m)

Population (2010)
  - Total: 3,201
  - Density: 5,000/sq mi (1,900/km^{2})
- Time zone: UTC-6 (CST)
  - Summer (DST): UTC-5 (CDT)
- Area code: 504

Uptown is a primarily residential neighborhood of the city of New Orleans. A subdistrict of the Uptown/Carrollton Area, its boundaries as defined by the New Orleans City Planning Commission are: LaSalle Street to the north, Napoleon Avenue to the east, Magazine Street to the south and Jefferson Avenue to the west.

== Geography ==
Uptown is located at 29°55′34″N 90°06′28″W and has an elevation of 2 feet (0.6 m). According to the United States Census Bureau, the district has a total area of 0.64 square miles (1.7 km^{2}). 0.64 square miles (1.7 km^{2}) of which is land and 0.00 square miles (0.0 km^{2}) (0.0%) of which is water.

=== Adjacent Neighborhoods ===
- Freret (north)
- Milan (east)
- Touro (east)
- West Riverside (south)
- Audubon (west)

=== Boundaries ===
The New Orleans City Planning Commission defines the boundaries of Uptown as these streets: LaSalle Street, Napoleon Avenue, Magazine Street and Jefferson Avenue. Uptown New Orleans is colloquially used to describe a number of neighborhoods between the French Quarter and Jefferson Parish line.

== Demographics ==
As of the census of 2000, there were 6,681 people, 3,233 households, and 1,446 families living in the neighborhood. The population density was 10,439 /mi^{2} (3,930 /km^{2}).

As of the census of 2010, there were 5,984 people, 2,921 households, and 1,252 families living in the neighborhood.

== Notable people ==
- Jennifer Sneed Heebe, former state representative and Jefferson Parish council member, Uptown resident since 2008
- Peggy Wilson, former member of the New Orleans City Council, raised in Uptown

== See also ==
- New Orleans neighborhoods
- Uptown New Orleans
