= Rosa F. Keller Library and Community Center =

Library and community center in New Orleans, Louisiana, U.S.

Coordinates: 29.94875°N 90.10371°W

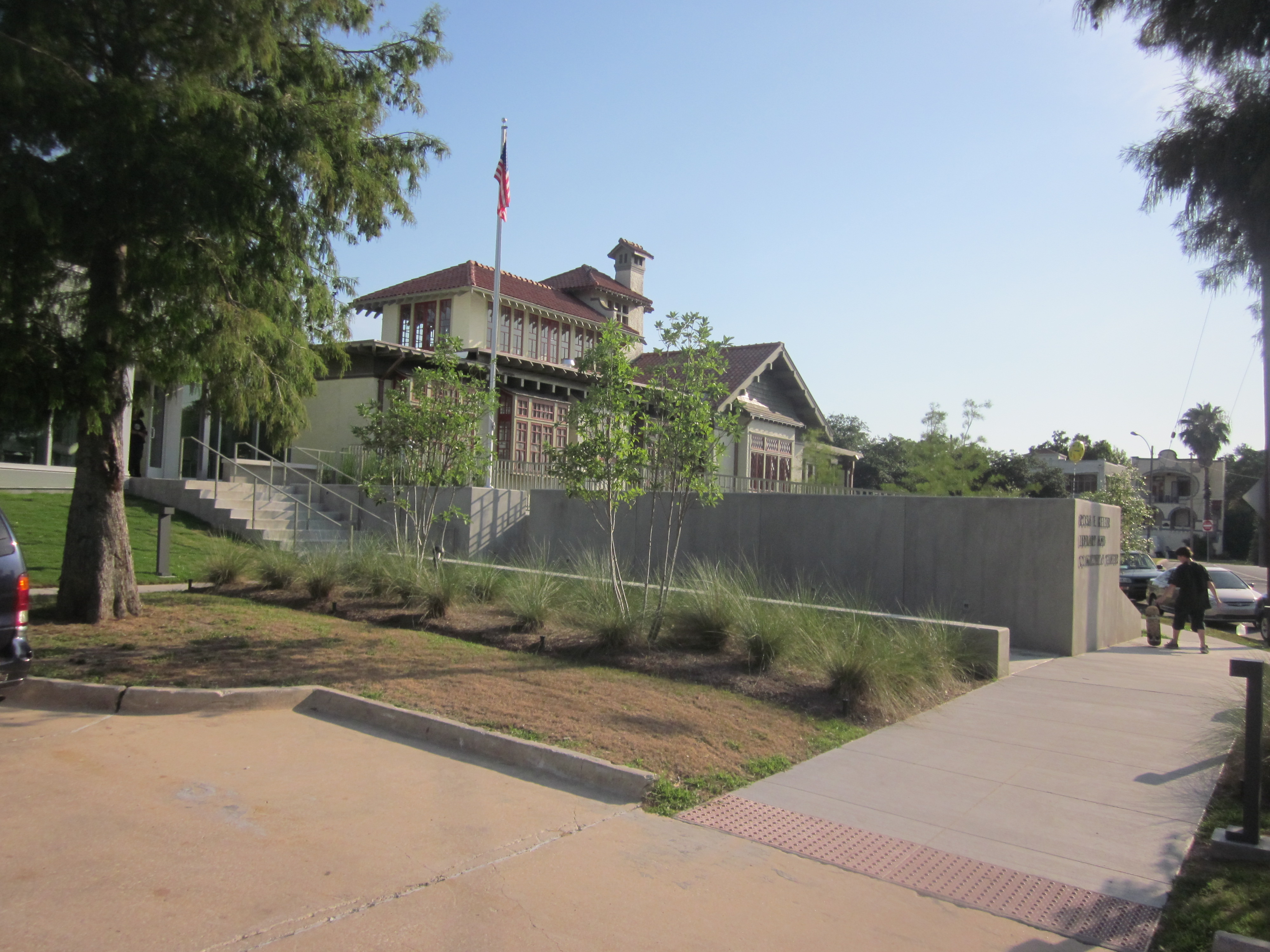
Rosa F. Keller Library and Community Center

The Rosa F. Keller Library and Community Center is located in the Broadmoor neighborhood of New Orleans, Louisiana. It stands on the corner of Napoleon Avenue and South Broad Street which serve as the north/south, and east/west markers in the neighborhood. The library is a branch of the greater New Orleans Public Library System. The Broadmoor branch serves as one of the only centers for community engagement in the neighborhood and hosts adult education classes, art workshops, after-school activities for children, and community events throughout the year. It opened its doors on March 17, 2012.

== Early history ==
The original building housing the Rosa F. Keller Library served as a private family residence for many years before being sold to the city in 1990. One of the first homes in the area, Mrs. Ethel Aubert Hardie purchased the eight-room stucco home after its completion in 1918 at a cost of $9500. It was one of the most recognizable landmarks in the neighborhood.

After the Hardie family enlarged the property and sold it in 1924, ownership transferred once more before the home's final resident, Dr. Ida Finkelstein Fattel, sold it to the city of New Orleans for $215,000 in 1990. Due to its architectural significance, the New Orleans Historic Districts/Landmarks Commission designated the home a historic landmark under the name of Hardie-Fattel House in 1986.

The home opened as the Broad Branch of the New Orleans Public Library in November 1993.

== Rosa Keller Dedication ==
The branch was named in honour of civil rights advocate and New Orleans Public Library pioneer, Rosa Freeman Keller in October 1999.

Rosa Freeman Keller was born in New Orleans in 1911. A white heiress to a Coca-Cola bottling fortune, Keller could easily have chosen to live out her days quietly and comfortably in her Uptown home, with little social reflection. Instead, she used her finances and influence to launch a lifelong fight for racial equality in the city of New Orleans. She became the first woman to serve on a citywide board in New Orleans as a member of the board of the New Orleans Public Library, and used that position to push for the integration of the library system.

Keller received numerous honors for her work on racial issues in New Orleans, including the Times-Picayune Loving Cup Award, which honors New Orleans residents who have worked unselfishly for the community without expectation of public acclaim or material reward. She also received an honorary alumnus degree from Newcomb College and an honorary doctorate from Dillard University. She died on April 15, 1998, in New Orleans. The Keller Family Foundation, established in 1949, continues to provide monies to sustain and improve the New Orleans community. The Rosa F. Keller Library & Community Center at 4300 S. Broad was named for her.

== Construction after Katrina ==
Topographically one of the lowest points in New Orleans, Broadmoor suffered extensive damage due to Hurricane Katrina. In 2006, the neighborhood was deemed a drainage point in the city's reconstruction plan under the Bring New Orleans Back Commission that was led by the former mayor Ray Nagin. The proposal was met with strong opposition as residents rallied to save their neighborhood from disinvestment and destruction. The Keller Library became an important symbol of Broadmoor and a natural locus for redevelopment efforts with the Broadmoor Improvement Association, founded in 1930, touting the notion of an education corridor as central to its neighborhood vision.

This corridor consists of the expanded Keller Library and Community Center, the Andrew H. Wilson Charter School and the Broadmoor Arts and Wellness Center. The result of a lengthy process of planning, fundraising, and review was the total rehabilitation of the historic home with the construction of an entirely new wing, designed by renowned New Orleans architecture firm Eskew+Dumez+Ripple. Gibbs Construction served as the construction company. The new construction had a cost of $6.8 million, and the area was to be 71,000 square feet (6,600 m^{2}). While the house was to be renovated and serve specifically as a community center, the 1993 building was to be demolished. A technology center with 28 computers and the Green Dot Cafe was to be placed in the new library building replacing the previous one. Both the house and the new library building were to be connected by a corridor.

During the recovery, the Federal Emergency Management Agency (FEMA) and the Louisiana Recovery Authority planned a $15.8 million effort to build or rebuild six libraries in the region. Keller was awarded $3.4 million toward building a state-of-the-art library and community center to serve as the local community's learning and cultural hub. FEMA was to pay for the costs of demolition of the previous library and construction of the new library since the previous facility had been, according to FEMA's estimation, over 50% damaged by Katrina. The features and amenities present in the new facility that were not in the previous facility were financed by other sources, including New Orleans municipal bond sales and funds from the Louisiana Recovery Authority. The "design-build" process, one specially allowed only in parishes affected by Hurricane Katrina under Louisiana law, was used to rebuild this library and four others.

The library also benefitted from a $2 million grant from the Carnegie Foundation, which the Broadmoor Improvement Association secured independently through private-public partnerships established during the recovery process. The total cost of the renovation and expansion was $6.8 million.

== Building design ==
The use of natural sunlight is key within the library where access to books, social interaction, and connectivity to the internet are all equally important. As much a social hub as it is an academic center, the library was rebuilt within the framework of a 21st-century model to allow technological access for community members that may not have it at home. The floor of the new addition is aligned with the renovated home, both built on raised footings above the Base Flood Elevation line. At its center, the new building contains a small courtyard surrounded by glass walls that is visible from within the main library. The building's largest and most expansive space holds the computer and reading tables, main desk, and library office, which functions as an enclosed light in green glass, illuminating the space.

The design takes a more sustainable approach to wood paneling which uses recycled wooden slats around the parameter of the reading space. Shaded skylights filter harsh sunlight allowing the space to be naturally cooled during hot weather. The tinted glass light well also helps to vary the natural light across the space and throughout the day. Other areas are clad in perforated metal panels meant to mimic the textured stucco of the original home. Though the uses are separate, both the library and the community center complement each other in design by including a semi-raised horizontal axis that reaches its lowest point at the entrance.

== Cultural significance ==
The library stands as a model for Post-Katrina development and symbolizes the triumph that Broadmoor has achieved after the storm. Visually different from the residential buildings surrounding the structure, the Rosa F. Keller Library and Community Center highlight the architectural innovation that certain communities have embraced with rebuilding. The neighborhood is a demographic microcosm of New Orleans with 67 percent African American, 26 percent white, and 4 percent Hispanic, all of whom are served by the establishment of the library and the resources it has.

== Awards ==
Listed in New Orleans Magazine as the "Best New Architecture in 2012"

2013 AIA New Orleans Honor Award

2012 IIDA Delta Region Award of Excellence
