= Freret, New Orleans =

Freret
- New Orleans neighborhood
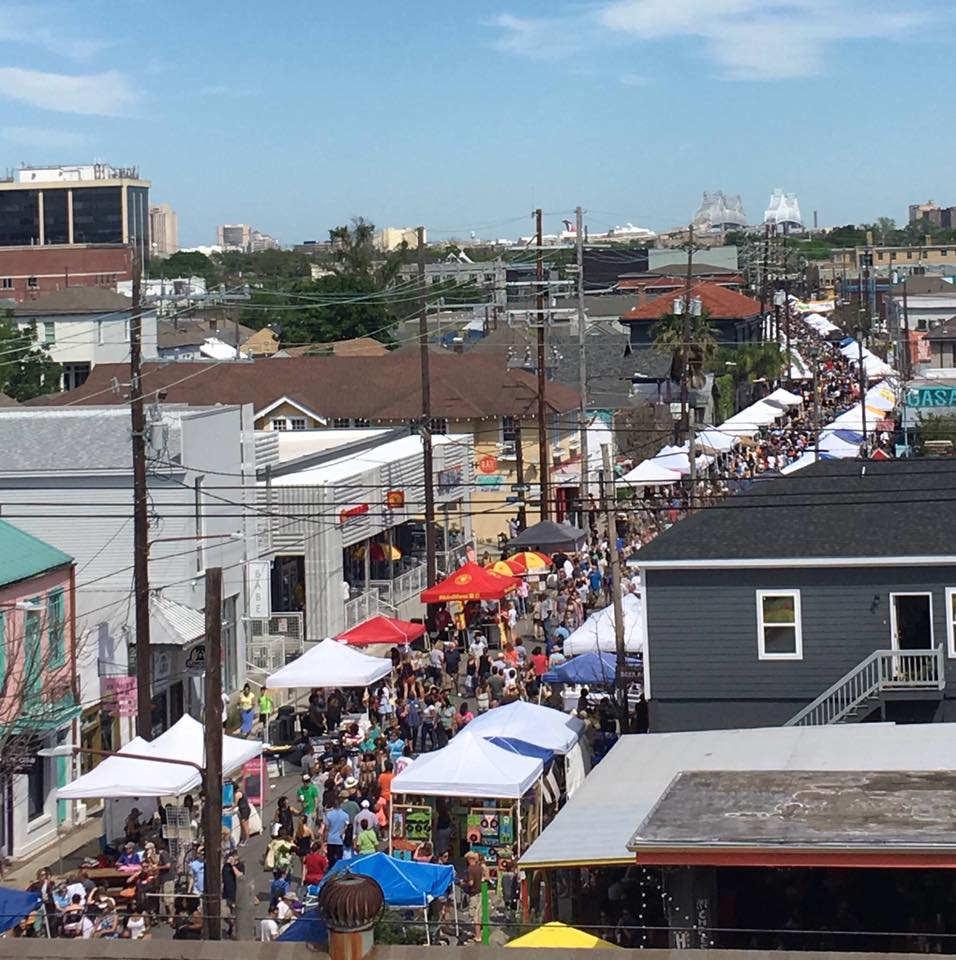
- Freret Commercial Corridor, Overlooking Freret Festival
- Interactive map of Freret
- Coordinates: 29°56′15″N 90°06′25″W
- Country: United States
- State: Louisiana
- City: New Orleans
- Planning District: District 3, Uptown/Carrollton

Area
  - Total: 0.19 sq mi (0.49 km^{2})
  - Land: 0.19 sq mi (0.49 km^{2})
  - Water: 0.00 sq mi (0 km^{2})
- Elevation: 0 ft (0 m)

Population (2000)
  - Total: 2,446
  - Density: 13,000/sq mi (5,000/km^{2})
- Time zone: UTC-6 (CST)
  - Summer (DST): UTC-5 (CDT)
- Area code: 504

Freret is a neighborhood of the city of New Orleans, Louisiana. The Freret neighborhood contains a thriving commercial corridor. A subdistrict of the Uptown/Carrollton Area, its boundaries as defined by the New Orleans City Planning Commission are: South Claiborne Avenue to the north, Napoleon Avenue to the east, LaSalle Street to the south and Jefferson Avenue to the west. The name of the neighborhood stems from Freret Street, which was named for William Freret, a mid-19th-century New Orleans mayor.

== Geography ==
Freret is located at 29°56′15″N 90°06′25″W and has an elevation of 0 feet (0.0 m). According to the United States Census Bureau, the district has a total area of 0.19 square miles (0.5 km^{2}). 0.19 square miles (0.5 km^{2}) of which is land and 0.00 square miles (0.0 km^{2}) (0.0%) of which is water.

=== Adjacent neighborhoods ===
- Broadmoor (north)
- Milan (east)
- Uptown (south)
- Audubon (west)

== Demographics ==
As of the census of 2010, there were 1,715 people, 648 households, and 363 family households.

== Landmarks and Attractions ==
=== Restaurants / Bars / Amenities ===
The Freret Commercial Corridor, located on Freret Street between Jefferson and Napoleon Avenue, has over 17 restaurants, 3 coffee shops, and 3 bars, a convenience store, and two grocery stores.

=== Hotels ===
The 10 story, 90 room Alder Hotel is located in the former Bristow Tower on Magnolia Street,

== See also ==
- New Orleans neighborhoods
