= Magazine Street =

Street in New Orleans, Louisiana, U.S.

Magazine Street is a major thoroughfare in New Orleans, Louisiana. Like Tchoupitoulas Street, St. Charles Avenue, and Claiborne Avenue, it follows the curving course of the Mississippi River. The street took its name from an ammunition magazine located in this vicinity during the 18th-century colonial period.

== History ==
Alternatively, the street may have been named after the Spanish word magazin or almazon which means 'warehouse.' The story goes that General James Wilkinson from Kentucky made a controversial trip to New Orleans to trade American products with the Spanish. He persuaded Governor Esteban Rodríguez Miró to give Kentucky a monopoly on the Mississippi River trade. Wilkinson became an official agent, and a warehouse or magazin was built for him.

The historical French designation of this street, rue des Magasins, in turns points to a general reference to a number of ware- or store-houses associated with the street.

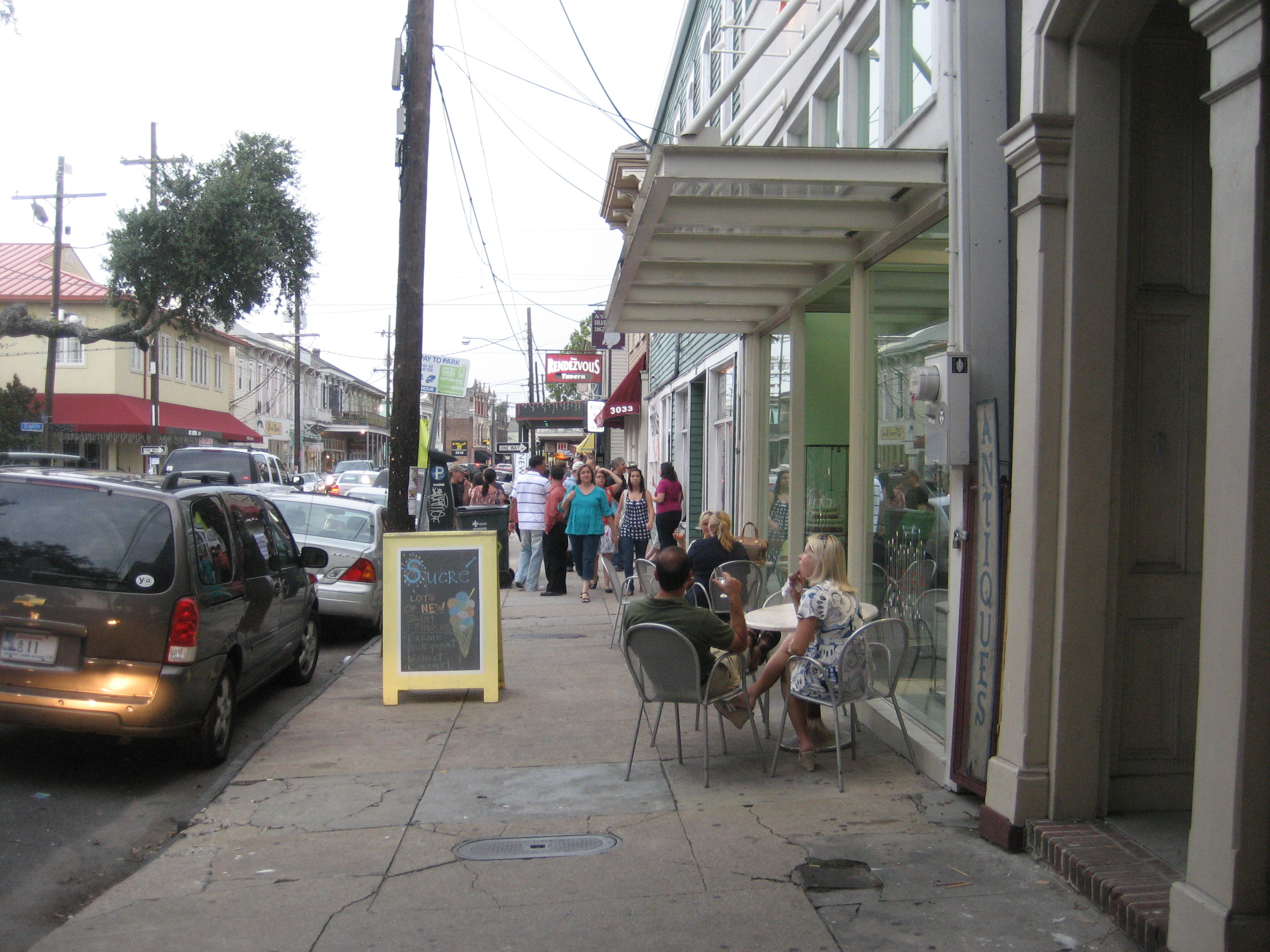
Commercial section of Magazine Street

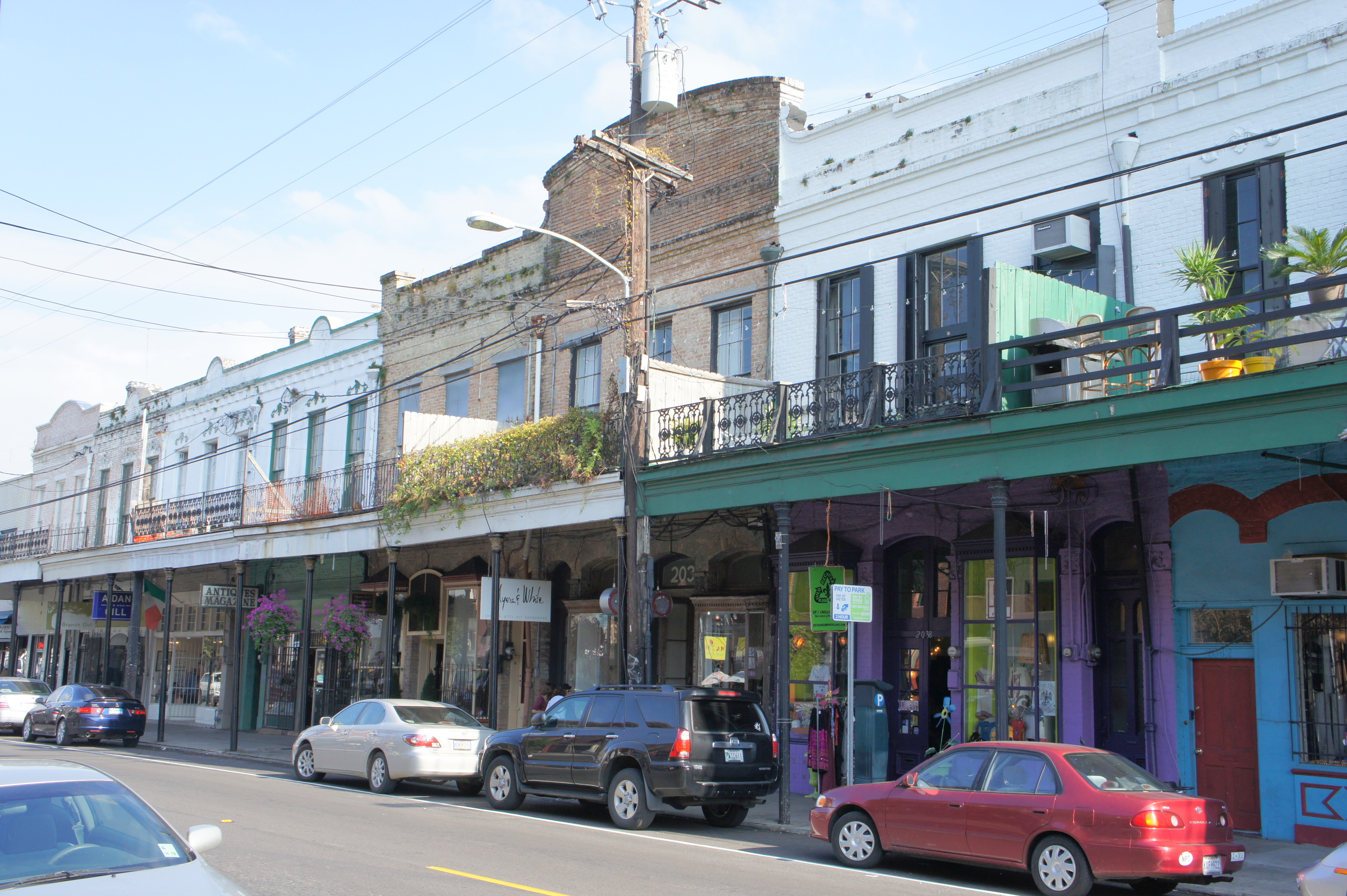
Magazine Street at Josephine

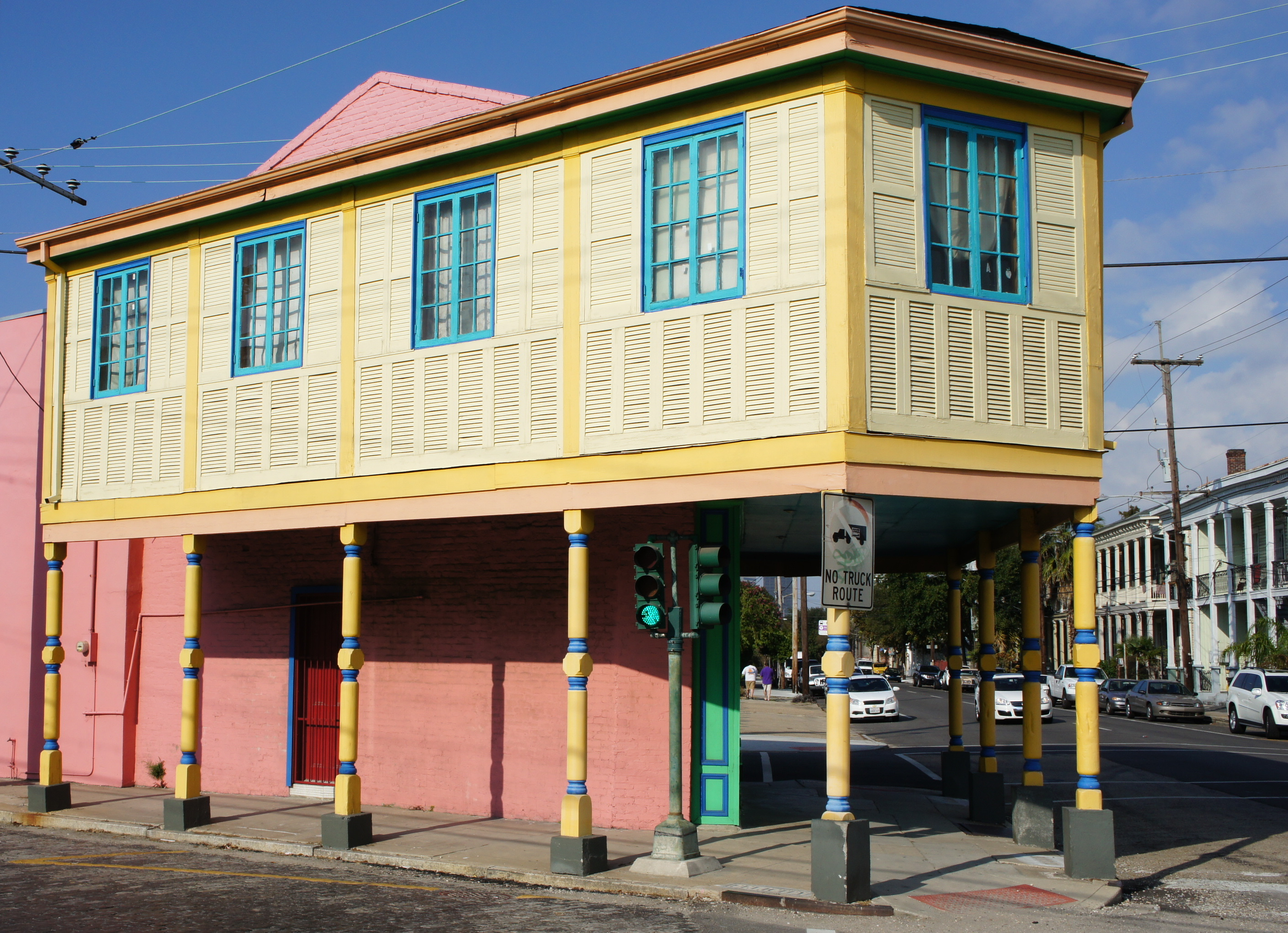
Magazine Street at Felicity

== Description ==
The downriver end of Magazine Street is at Canal Street; on the other side of Canal Street in the French Quarter the street becomes Decatur Street. From Canal through the Central Business District and Lower Garden District, Magazine Street is one-way in the upriver direction; downriver traffic forks to join Camp Street, the next street away from the river. Above Felicity Street to the far Uptown end it has a lane of traffic going in both directions with parking on both sides. It is an RTA bus route.

The street follows the length of the crescent through Uptown. After several miles of residential and commercial neighborhoods, it cuts through Audubon Park, with Audubon Zoo on the river side of the street. The far upper end of the street is at Leake Avenue, a part of the Great River Road, where it turns away from the river in the Carrollton riverbend.

Most of the street is a mix of residential and commercial buildings, generally older houses from the later nineteenth century and similarly aged commercial stretches consisting of antique shops, clothing boutiques, restaurants, and bars. Magazine Street is well known for being a popular shopping district for interested tourists. The street however runs a length of six miles, so it is generally recommended by travel connoisseurs to hail a cab or ridesharing company when shopping in the area. Magazine Street shopping offers a unique selection of products many of which are handcrafted and one-of-a-kind pieces.

== See also ==
- Garden District, New Orleans
- List of streets of New Orleans
- Sliver by the River
- Simon of New Orleans
