= 2018–19 European windstorm season =

- First storm formed: 16 September 2018
- Last storm dissipated: 12 June 2019
- Strongest storm^{1}: Callum (938 hPa)
- Strongest wind gust: Storm Adrian 188 km/h (117 mph; 102 kn); Cap Pertusato, France (27 October). (Note: A wind gust of 245 km/h (152 mph; 132 kn) was measured at 3,845 m (12,615 ft) on Aiguille du Midi, France, during Storm Laura on 6 March.)
- Total storms: 23
- Total damage: ≥ £3.42 billion (≥ €3.81 billion) (2018)
- Total fatalities: 48
- ^{1}Strongest storm is determined by lowest pressure and maximum recorded non-mountainous wind gust is also included for reference.

The 2018–2019 European windstorm season was the fourth instance of seasonal European windstorm naming in Europe. Most storms form between September and March. The first named storm, Ali, affected primarily the United Kingdom and Ireland on 19 September 2018.

== Background and naming ==
In 2015, the British and Irish national meteorological agencies, Met Office and Met Éireann respectively, announced a pilot project to name storm warnings as part of the Name our Storms project for wind storms and asked the public for suggestions. The meteorological offices produced a full list of names for 2015–2016 through to 2017–2018, common to both the UK and Ireland. A new list of names was released on 11 September 2018 for the 2018–2019 season. Names in the UK were based on the National Severe Weather Warning Service, when a storm is assessed to have the potential for an Amber 'be prepared' or Red 'take action (danger to life)' warning.

There are two main naming lists, created by the national meteorological agencies of the UK and Ireland, and France, Spain and Portugal respectively. Additionally, former Atlantic hurricanes will retain their names as assigned by the National Hurricane Center of the United States.

=== United Kingdom and Ireland ===
- Ali
- Bronagh
- Callum
- Deirdre
- Erik
- Freya
- Gareth
- Hannah
- Idris (unused)
- Jane (unused)
- Kevin (unused)
- Lily (unused)
- Max (unused)
- Niamh (unused)
- Oliver (unused)
- Peggy (unused)
- Ross (unused)
- Saoirse (unused)
- Tristan (unused)
- Violet (unused)
- Wyn (unused)

=== France, Spain and Portugal ===
This is the second season in which the meteorological agencies of France, Spain and Portugal will be naming storms which affect their areas. This naming scheme is partially overlapping with that used by the UK and Ireland, as storms named by the other group of agencies will be used reciprocally.

- Adrian
- Beatriz
- Carlos
- Diana
- Etienne
- Flora
- Gabriel
- Helena
- Isaias
- Julia
- Kyllian
- Laura
- Miguel
- Nicole (unused)
- Oscar (unused)
- Patricia (unused)
- Roberto (unused)
- Sara (unused)
- Teo (unused)
- Vanessa (unused)
- Walid (unused)

=== Other naming systems ===
Two former Atlantic hurricanes transitioned into European windstorms during the season, and retained their names as assigned by the National Hurricane Center in Miami, Florida:

- Helene
- Leslie

Additionally to these naming systems, the Free University of Berlin also names high and low pressure areas through its "Adopt a vortex" programme. The Nordic nations of Denmark, Norway and Sweden also name storms with more limited reciprocation. Other nations may also name storms either through their national meteorological institutions or popularly.

== Season summary ==
The season began on 16 September 2018 with the naming of Storm Helene, a former Atlantic hurricane. However, as it weakened considerably while approaching the British Isles, all warnings for Helene were discontinued on 18 September. Later that day, the second storm of the season, Storm Ali, was named by the Met Office and Met Éireann with the issuance of amber wind warnings for the following day. The third storm of the season, Bronagh, was named on 20 September; the earliest third named storm in a season since naming began.

== Storms ==
The season was prefaced by the extratropical remnants of Hurricane Helene which affected the UK and Ireland on 17–18 September. This began an active period of storm formation under a fast moving jet stream over the Atlantic.

=== Ex-Hurricane Helene ===
Helene
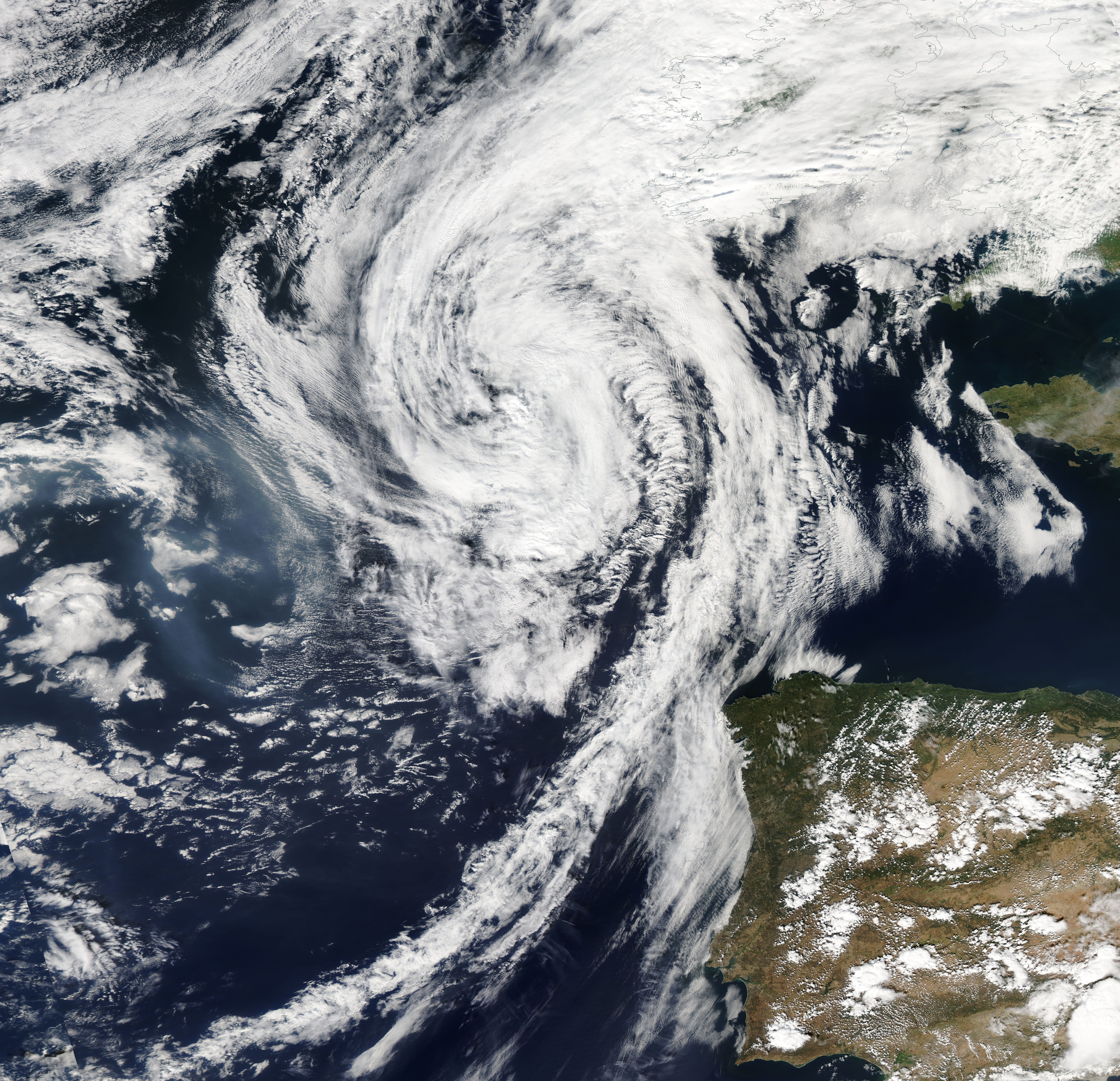

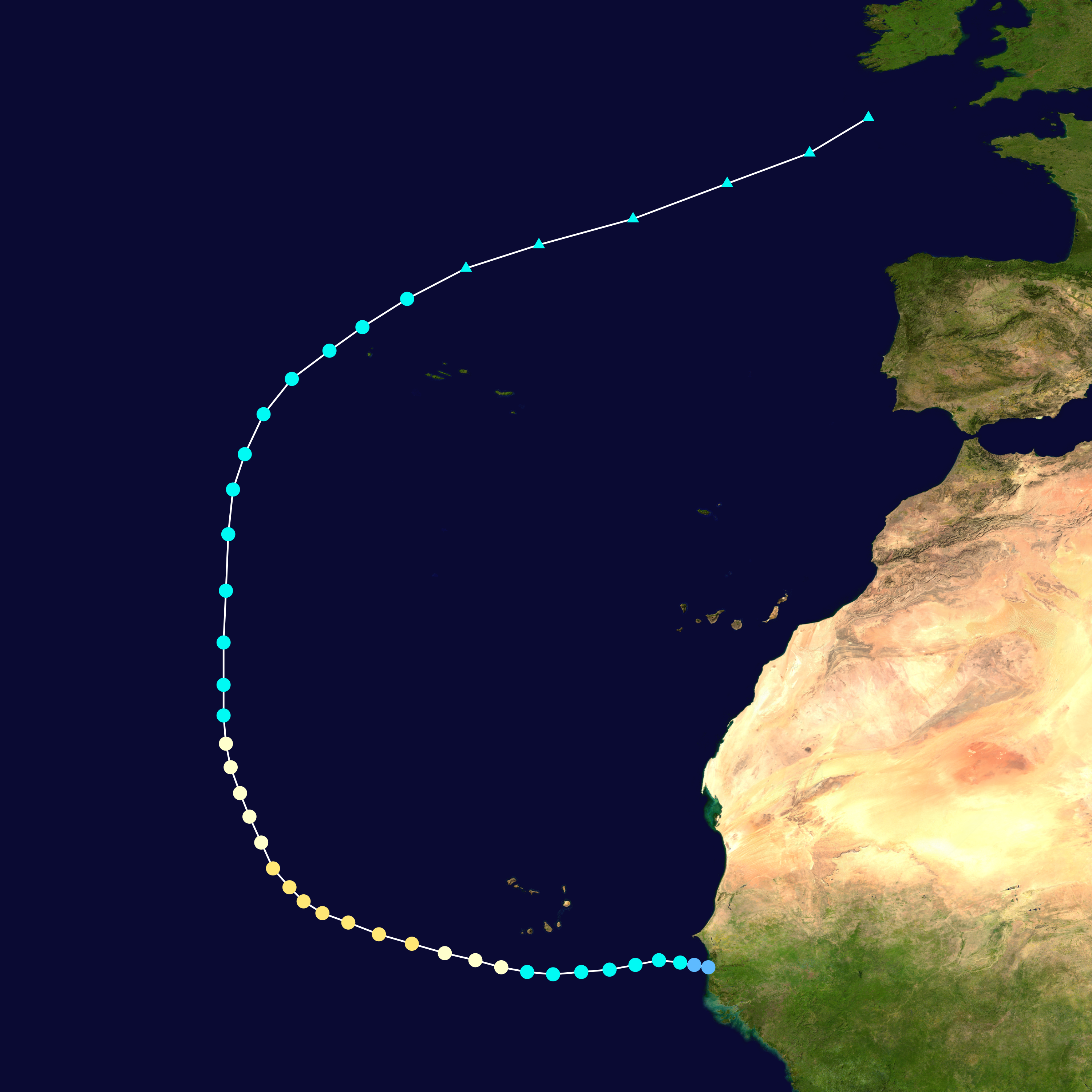
- Track of storm Helene according to the Saffir-Simpson scale
- Area affected: Portugal, Spain, Ireland, United Kingdom
- Date of impact: 16–21 September 2018
- Maximum wind gust: 126 km/h (78 mph; 68 kn), Cairngorms, United Kingdom
- Lowest pressure: 987 hPa (29.1 inHg)
- Fatalities: None
- Power outages: None
- Damage: Undetermined

While still a tropical cyclone, Hurricane Helene affected the Azores from 15 to 16 September 2018. The system subsequently completed an extratropical transition on 16 September as it accelerated north-eastwards towards the British Isles, with the outer bands of Storm Helene causing minimal impacts in north-western Spain and Portugal.

Storm Helene crossed the UK and Ireland on 17–18 September, with the Met Office and Met Éireann issuing yellow wind warnings. The Met Office's yellow warning of wind covered southern England, the Midlands and Wales overnight from 17 to 18 September, with forecasts predicting winds of up to 60 to 70 mph (97 to 113 km/h; 52 to 61 kn).

Helene was downgraded as it approached the British Isles, with winds gusting to only 40 to 50 mph (64 to 80 km/h; 35 to 43 kn) in isolated locations; as a result, all warnings were cancelled on 18 September as Helene was still crossing the UK. Subsequently, Helene emerged into the Norwegian Sea and stalled off the coast of Norway as a weakened system, finally being absorbed by Storm Bronagh approaching from the south-west on 21 September.

Hurricane Helene developing into an extratropical cyclone on 16–17 September 2018. Tropical Storm Joyce can be seen to the southwest of Helene.

=== Storm Ali ===
Ali
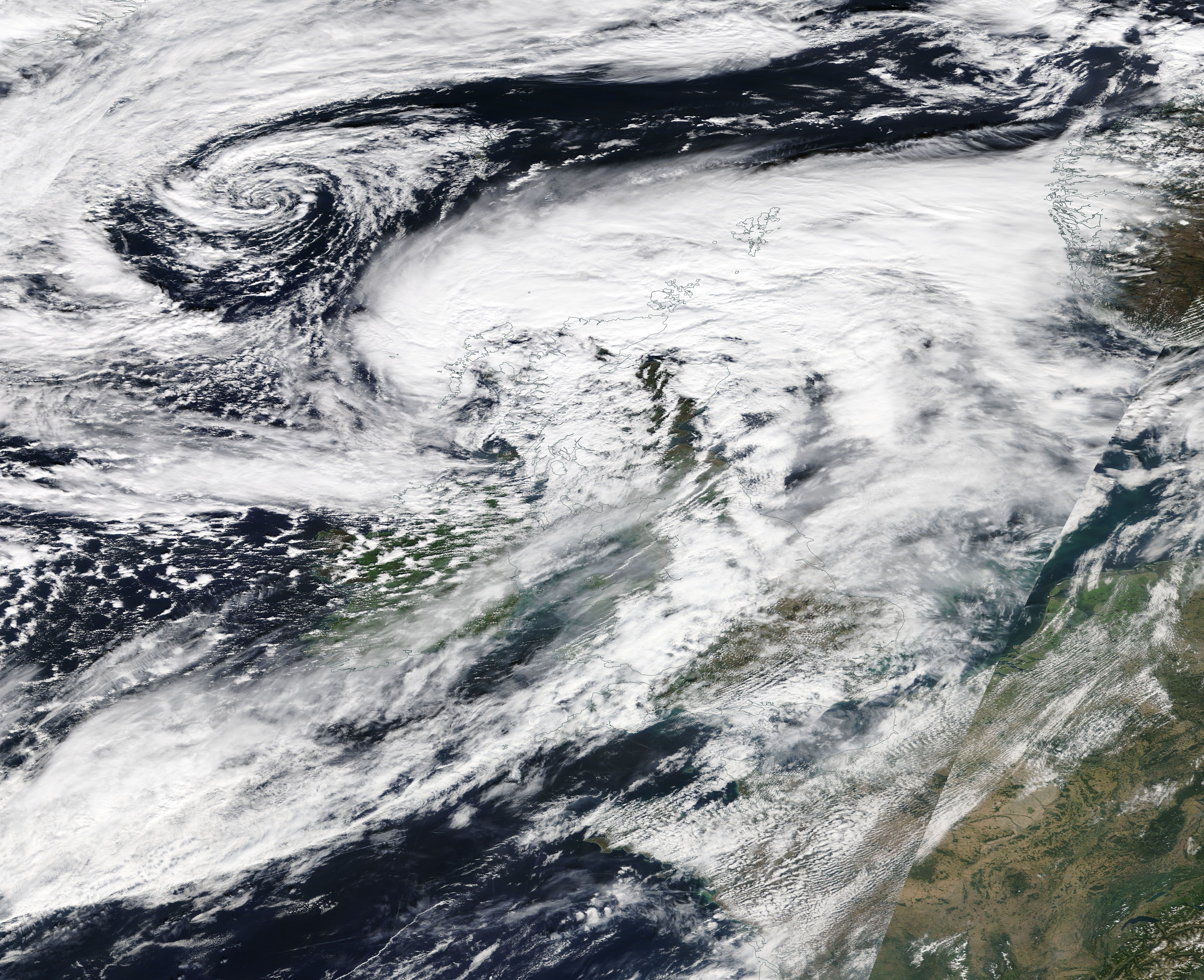
- Area affected: Ireland, Norway, United Kingdom
- Date of impact: 17–22 September 2018
- Maximum wind gust: 164 km/h (102 mph; 89 kn) recorded at Tay Road Bridge, Dundee, United Kingdom
- Lowest pressure: 967 hPa (28.6 inHg)
- Fatalities: 2
- Power outages: 286,000+
- Damage: ≥ £7.9 million (≥ €8.8 million)

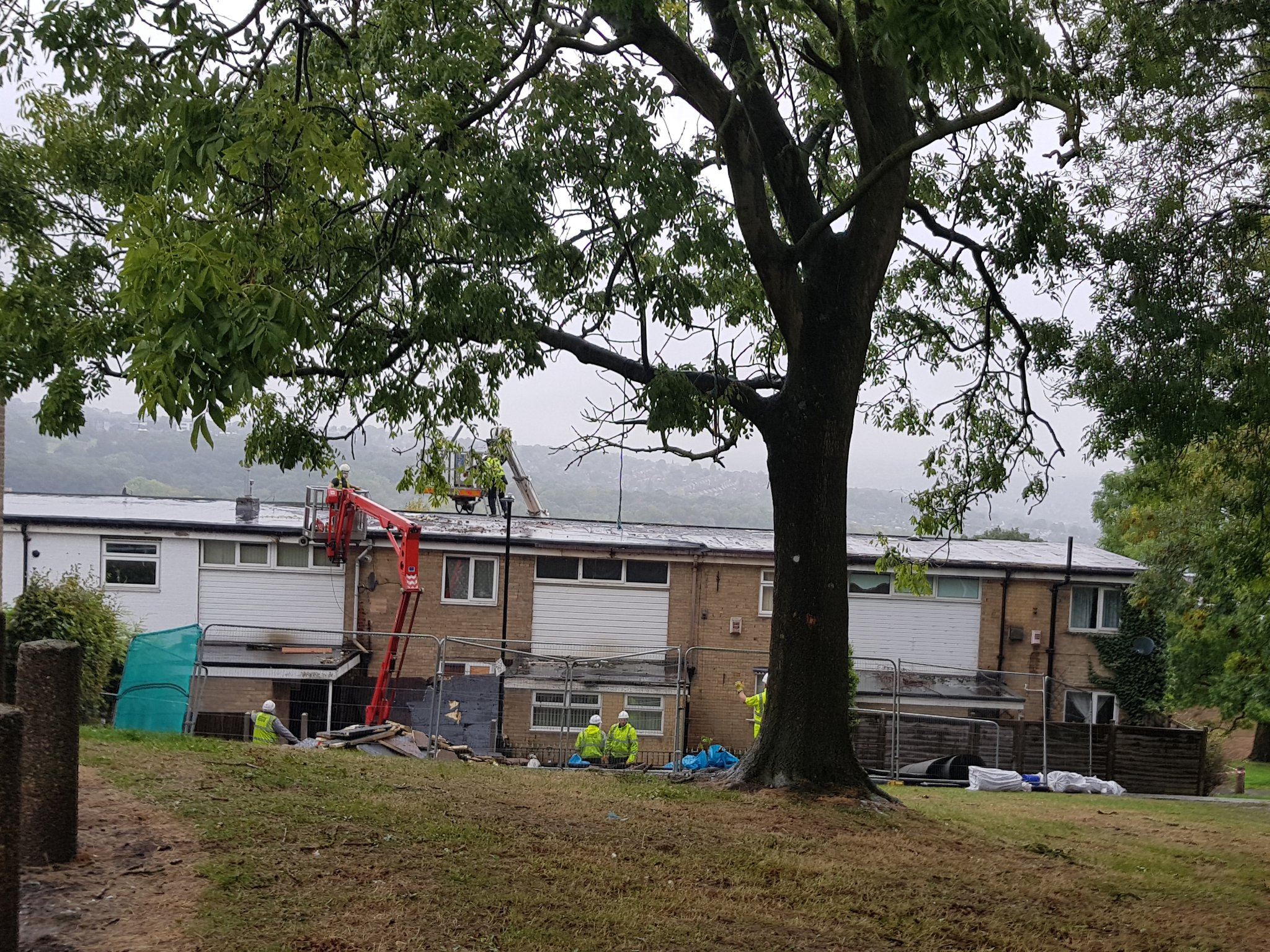
Repairs underway to a house in Sheffield on 20 September that had had its roof ripped off by Storm Ali.

Storm Ali was named on 18 September by Met Éireann and Met Office, who both issued Amber weather warnings for wind associated with Ali. The centre of circulation of Ali made landfall in south-western Ireland in the early hours of 19 September, crossing into Northern Ireland before re-emerging into the Atlantic and then making a second landfall close to Ullapool in north-western Scotland at around 14:00 local time (UTC+1). The highest wind gust recorded in the Republic of Ireland was 143 km/h (89 mph; 77 kn) at Mace Head weather station in County Galway. The highest gust record in the United Kingdom was 102 mph (164 km/h; 89 kn) recorded on the Tay Road Bridge in Scotland. The winds on this storm were equivalent to a Category 2 on the Saffir–Simpson scale.

Storm Ali killed two people in Ireland and the UK. A caravan was blown over a cliff onto a beach near the village of Claddaghduff in County Galway, killing a woman who was visiting from Switzerland. In County Armagh, a man in his 20s was killed by a falling tree. Falling trees also severely injured a woman in Cheshire. There was also severe tree damage in the Galway City and County region, which led to numerous school and road closures. Electricity supplies were lost to more than 100,000 homes across Northern Ireland, with more than 25,000 remaining without power into the following morning; the worst affected areas for power outages were Omagh, Dungannon and Enniskillen. Across the border in the Republic of Ireland, more than 186,000 properties lost electricity during Ali, of which 119,000 had power restored by the end of the day.

In County Antrim, the M1 motorway was closed in both directions for several hours after power cables fell across the carriageways. Enterprise trains between Belfast and Dublin were delayed for up to seven hours due to debris on the tracks. Services between Belfast and Derry were suspended, and a blanket speed restriction of 50 mph (80 km/h; 43 kn) was enforced on all NI Railways services pending track inspections, causing widespread delays. There were also delays to flights at Belfast International Airport. In Greenock in Scotland, the MS Nautica cruise ship broke free from her moorings and drifted for several hours before being rescued by tugboats.

A major incident was declared by police in Dumfries and Galloway after many people were injured by flying debris; schools were placed on lockdown for the safety of students, as Ali's highest winds in this area occurred around the end of the school day. On the Highland Main Line, a freight train was derailed after striking fallen tree branches. In Cumbria, fallen trees and power lines caused disruption to transport and left homes without power; overturned lorries caused the M6 motorway to close for several hours, and Virgin Trains services along the West Coast Main Line were delayed or cancelled between Preston and Glasgow Central. Dozens of trees fell or were damaged across the city of Sheffield, where council housing stock suffered considerable damage, including one housing block which had its roof ripped off in the Gleadless Valley area of the city.

After clearing the UK, Ali made landfall in Norway, where several thousand homes were left without power in the west of the country. Ali subsequently tracked over northern Scandinavia and into Siberia, exiting the basin on 22 September.

=== Storm Bronagh ===
Bronagh
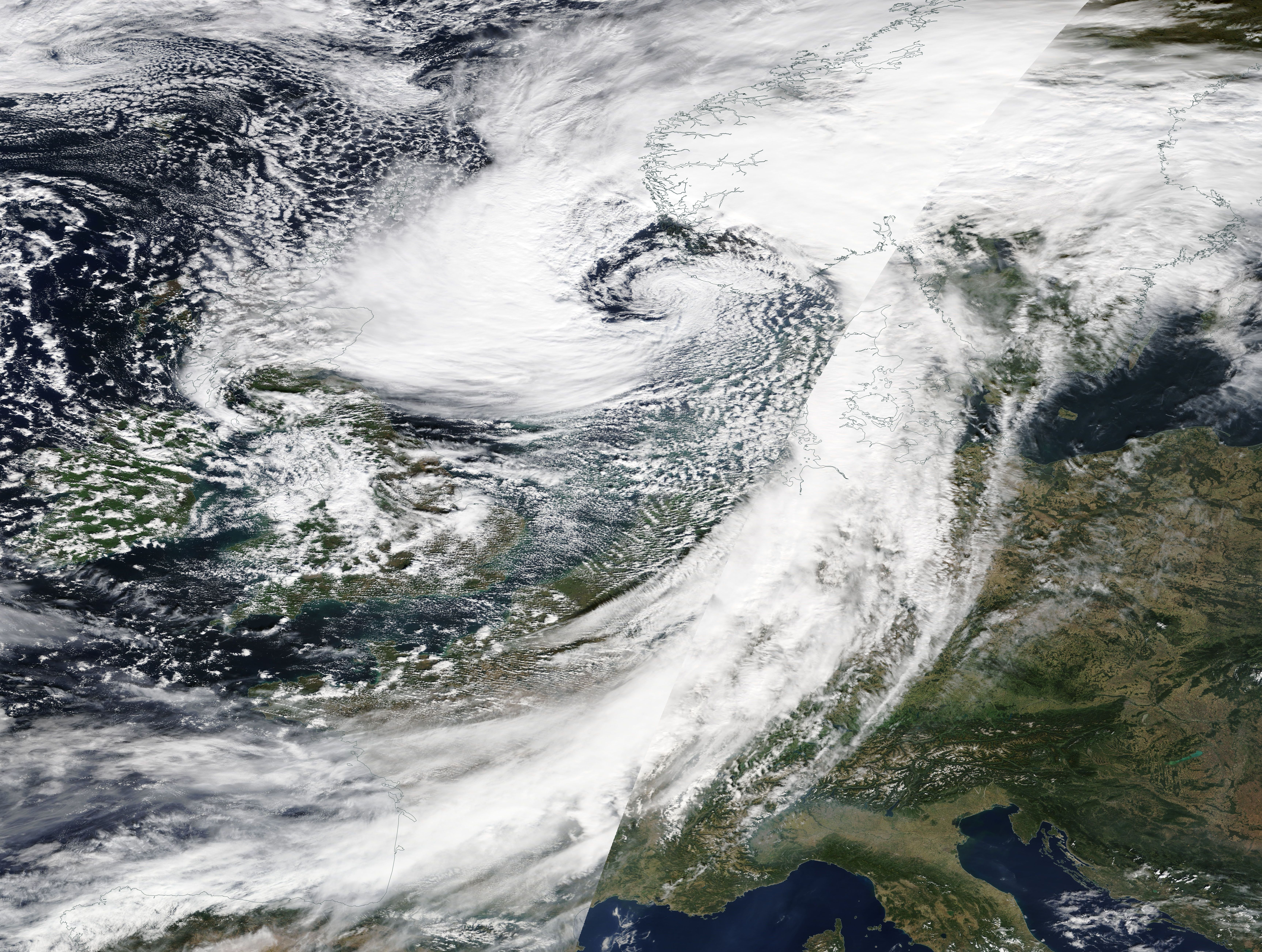
- Area affected: Ireland, Norway, United Kingdom, Denmark, Germany, Poland
- Date of impact: 20–25 September 2018
- Maximum wind gust: 154 km/h (96 mph; 83 kn), Høllen, Norway
- Lowest pressure: 969 hPa (28.6 inHg)
- Fatalities: 3
- Damage: ≥ £7.9 million (≥ €8.8 million)

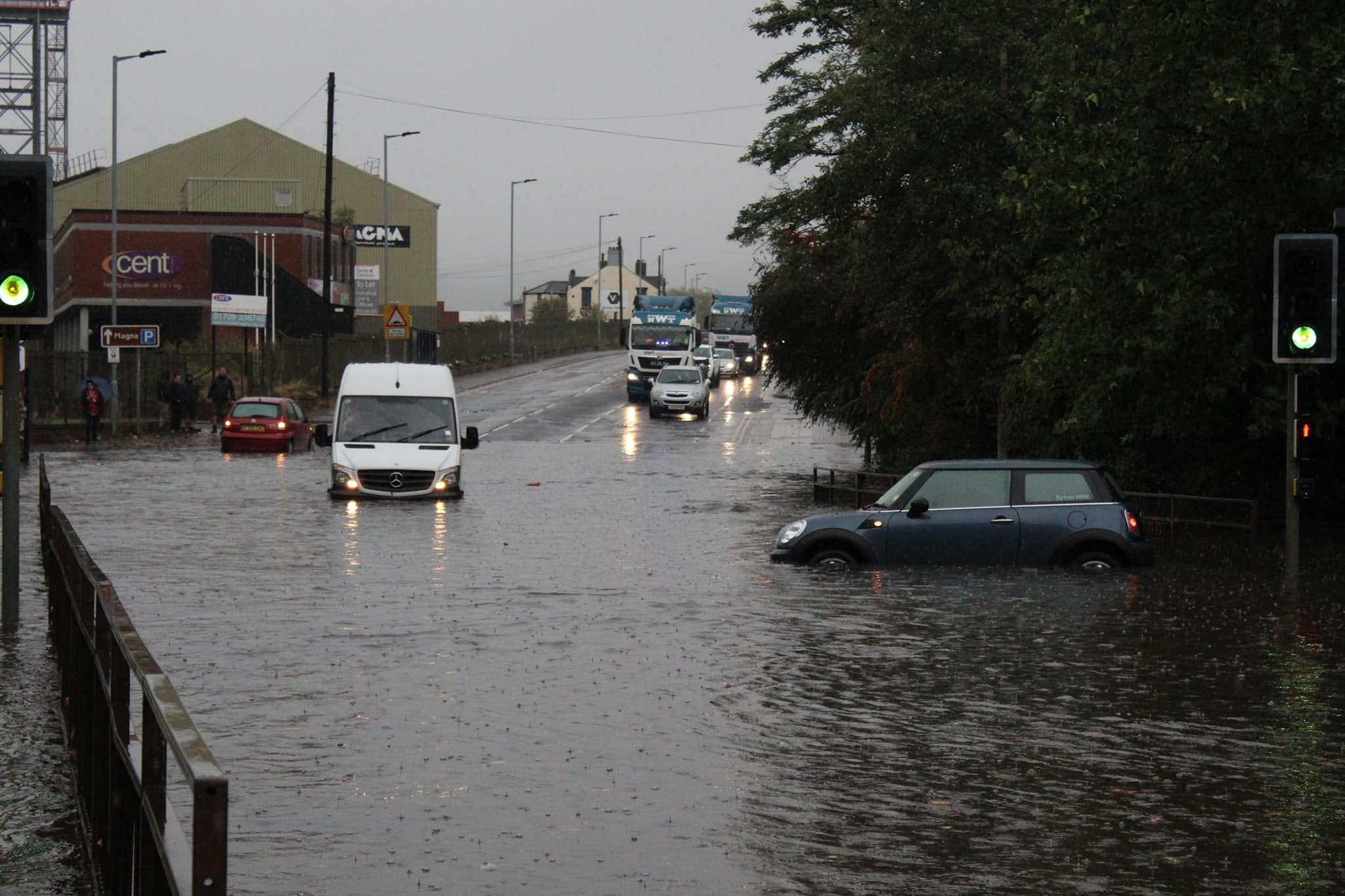
Storm Bronagh broke the record for the wettest September day ever recorded in Sheffield, resulting in the city's most serious flooding event since June 2007.

Bronagh first developed as a wave depression close to the southeast coast of Ireland. The storm was named on 20 September, and was expected to develop further over the British Isles. Yellow weather warnings were issued with the "possibility" that further upgrades to Amber warnings may be needed depending on how Bronagh developed over the UK. However, Bronagh did not develop over the Isles, and instead strengthened over the North Sea. Thus, no Amber alert for Bronagh was issued by the UK Met Office.

Bronagh brought heavy rainfall to southern Ireland, Wales, and northern England. Heavy rainfall fell across Wales and northern England on 20 September as Bronagh approached. In Sheffield, 66.2 mm (2.61 in) of rain fell in a 24-hour period, breaking the previous record of 58.9 mm (2.32 in) set on 14 September 1994 for the city's wettest September day since records began. Rainfall accumulations reached 70 mm (2.8 in) widely across Wales and northern England, with some parts of Wales recording up to 100 mm (3.9 in) of rain.

As a result of heavy rainfall from Bronagh, widespread flooding was reported. Flash flooding in Sheffield was the worst to affect the city since June 2007. Along the A6178 Sheffield Road between Sheffield and Rotherham, rapidly rising floodwaters caused cars and vans to become stranded. In nearby Tinsley, a woman had to be rescued from her car after becoming trapped in rising water. East Midlands Trains reported that severe flooding from the River Sheaf and Porter Brook was affecting Sheffield station, with services delayed or cancelled as a result. Bus services across the city were also suspended as the flooding peaked during the evening rush hour, stranding thousands of people. Flooding was additionally reported in Sheffield City Centre, Bradway, Intake, Meersbrook, Nether Edge and Woodseats amongst other districts.

The storm continued to intensify over the North Sea, tracking towards Norway. The island of Heligoland and the Alte Weser lighthouse on the German coast recorded gusts of 107 km/h (66 mph; 58 kn), while the Lindesnes Lighthouse in Norway recorded the highest wind speed at 154 km/h (96 mph; 83 kn). A truck driver in Hamburg suffered injuries after his truck was hit by a shipping container. Bronagh absorbed the remnants of ex-Hurricane Helene over the Norwegian Sea before making landfall in Scandinavia on 22 September, subsequently tracking northwards into the Arctic and out of the basin by 25 September.

=== Storm Callum ===
Callum
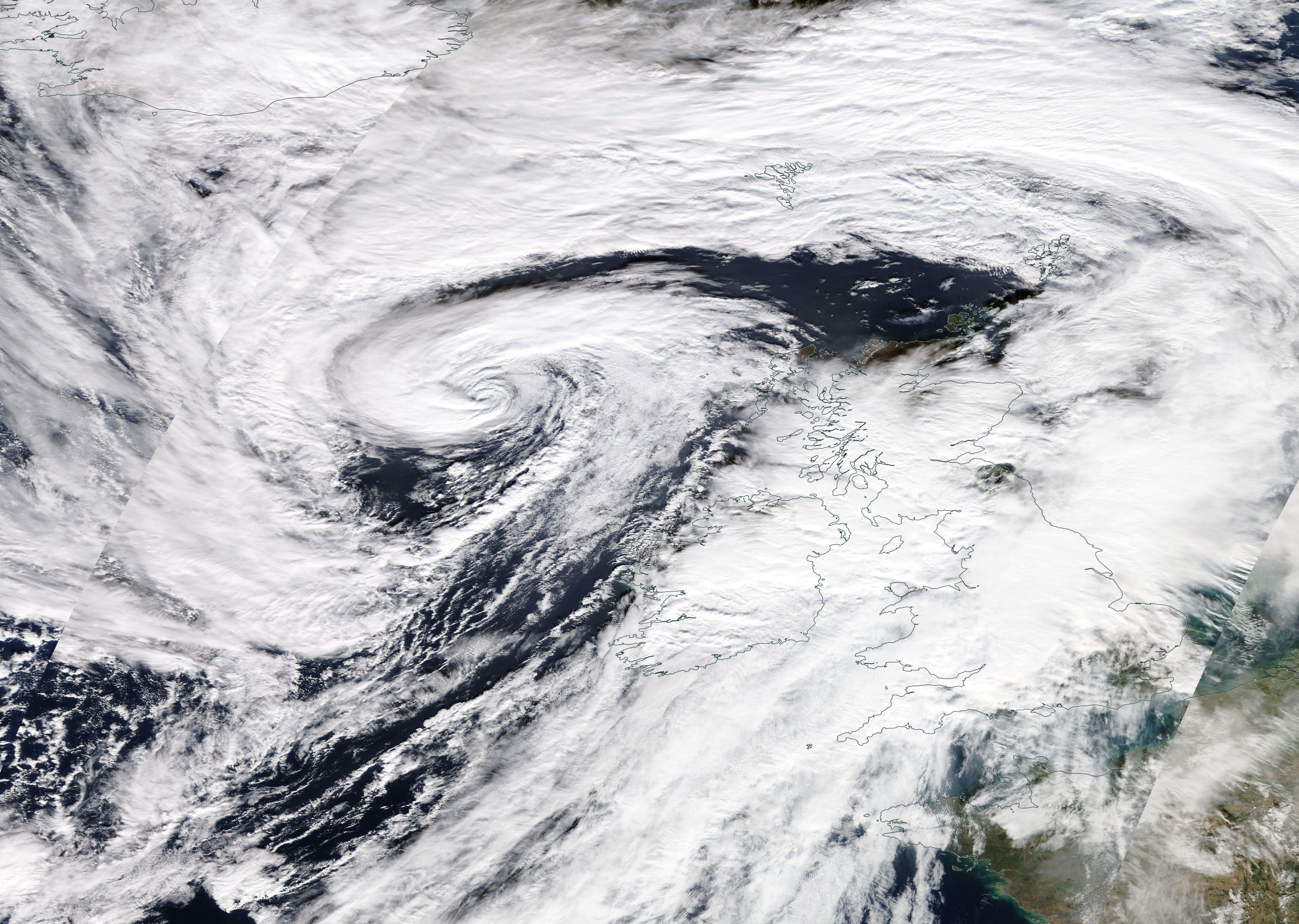
- Area affected: Ireland, United Kingdom
- Date of impact: 10–16 October 2018
- Maximum wind gust: 122 km/h (76 mph; 66 kn)
- Lowest pressure: 938 hPa (27.7 inHg)
- Fatalities: 2 (indirect)
- Damage: Undetermined

On 10 October, a weak weather system to the south of Spain organized into Storm Callum. Callum moved further northeastward while strengthening in particularly favourable conditions. The system then underwent explosive cyclogenesis, as it was forced toward the United Kingdom by a jet stream. On 11 October, Callum reached its peak intensity on approach to Cardiff, Wales. The storm began to weaken due to an impinging weather system. which had an adverse effect on Callum before it made impact on land. The system then brought intense winds with speeds of up to 122 km/h (76 mph; 66 kn) to parts of northern England, along with torrential rains to parts of Wales with 95.6 mm (3.76 in) recorded in Libanus but overall only made a minimal impact on land. Unexpected warm weather was reported soon after, with Donna Nook in Lincolnshire reaching 26.5 °C (79.7 °F) in the afternoon. At 21:00 UTC, Callum subsequently moved across Iceland and the Norwegian Sea as a weakened system, continuing northwards into the Arctic and out of the basin by 16 October.

As of 13 October 2018, the storm has caused two indirect fatalities; a 33-year-old man and a 35-year-old woman are said to have encountered difficulties in the Penarth Marina. The storm has caused one direct fatality; a person died after a landslide in Cwmduad.

=== Storm Leslie ===
Leslie
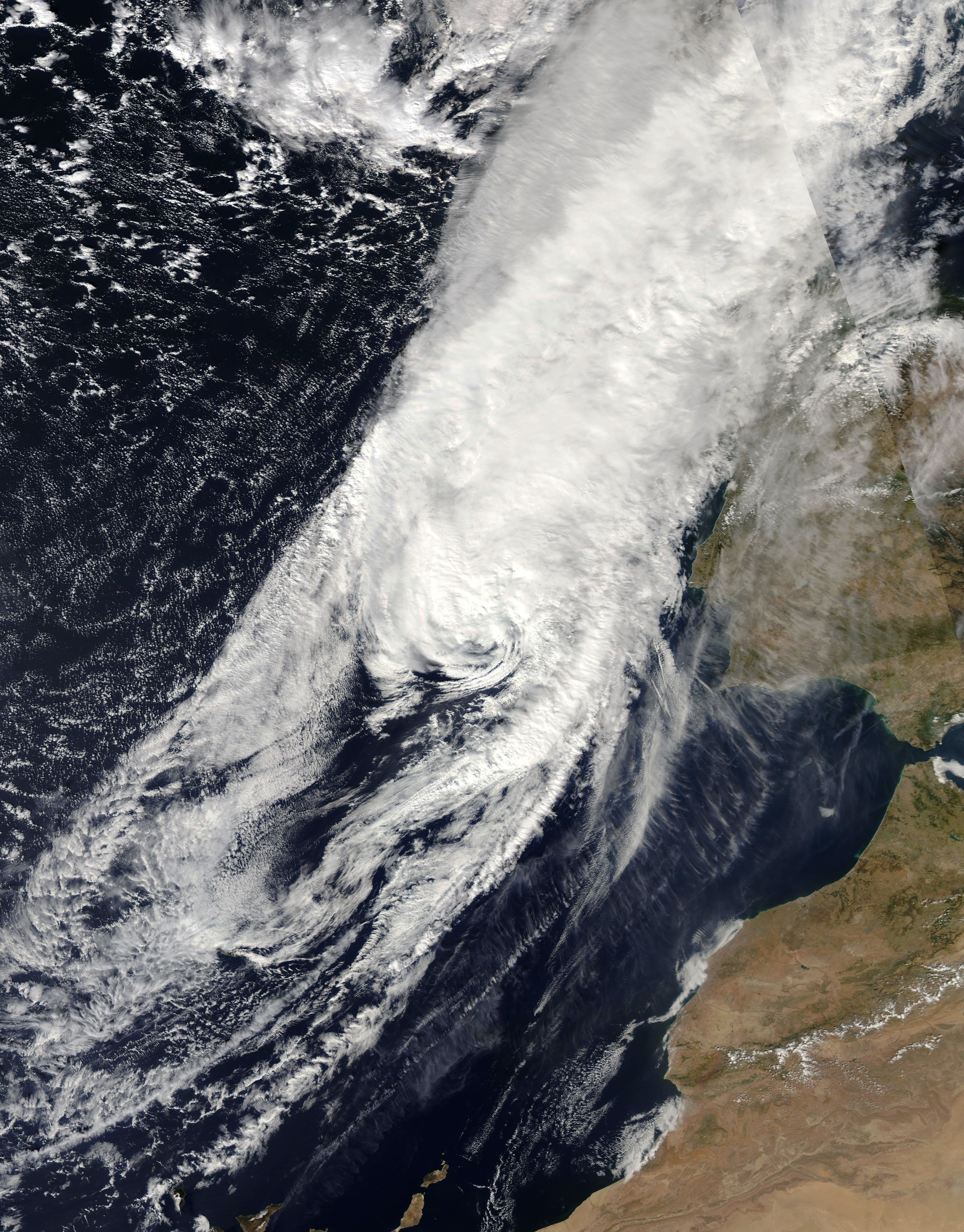

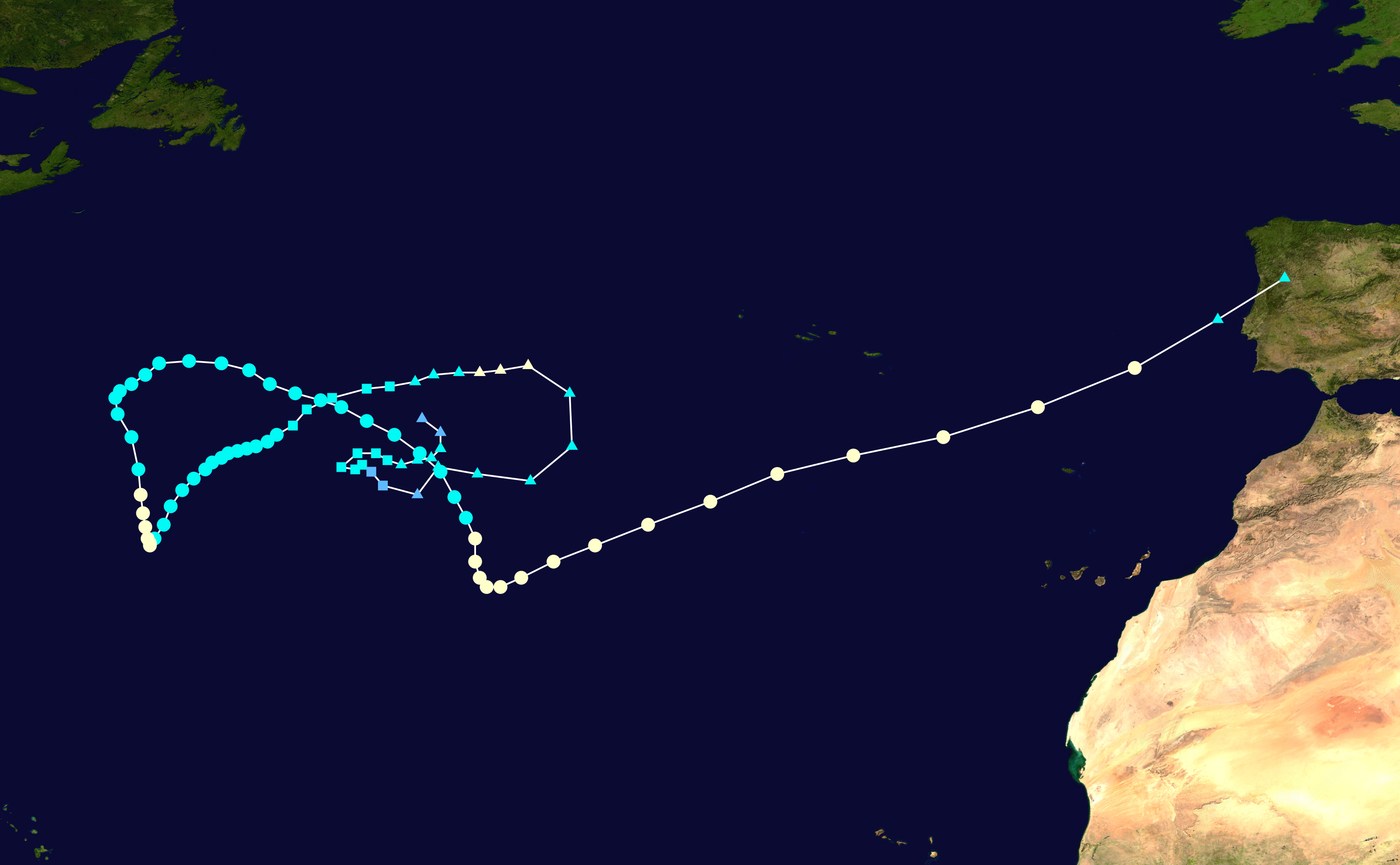
- Track of storm Leslie according to the Saffir-Simpson scale
- Area affected: Portugal, Spain, France
- Date of impact: 13–15 October 2018
- Maximum wind gust: 180 km/h (110 mph; 96 kn), Figueira da Foz, Portugal
- Lowest pressure: 984 hPa (29.1 inHg) (while extratropical)
- Fatalities: 17
- Power outages: 324,000
- Damage: ≥ £395 million (≥ €440 million)

While still a tropical cyclone, the center of Hurricane Leslie passed within 190 km (120 miles; 100 nautical miles) of Madeira. This prompted the issuance of tropical storm warnings to the archipelago on 11 October, the first ever tropical cyclone warnings issued in Europe. Beaches and parks were closed, 180 sports matches were postponed and dozens of flights were cancelled until Leslie began to move away from the archipelago and all warnings were cancelled on 13 October.

Leslie transitioned into a powerful extratropical cyclone on 13 October and made landfall in Figueira da Foz in central Portugal with sustained winds of 110 km/h (70 mph; 61 kn) at 21:10 UTC that day. Red weather warnings were issued for 13 out of 18 districts in Portugal by the time Leslie made landfall, including Lisbon. Extreme wind gusts, associated with a sting jet, were recorded in the Figueira da Foz area after landfall, gusting as high as 180 km/h (110 mph; 96 kn).

High winds and flooding from heavy rainfall caused damage across Portugal and Spain, leaving 324,000 homes without power in Portugal at the height of the storm. Sixty people were evacuated from their homes during the storm, and more than 1,000 trees were blown down across Portugal. Leslie caused two fatalities and 28 injuries in mainland Portugal, and damage estimated at more than €100 million across the Iberian peninsula.

Leslie weakened as it moved across the Iberian peninsula, with winds gusting up to a maximum of 97 km/h (60 mph; 52 kn) reported across Spain. However, heavy rainfall from the system persisted and later fed into a low-pressure system to the north, resulting in record-breaking rainfall across southern France. Severe thunderstorms and flash flooding were reported, with Carcassonne recording 180 mm (7.1 in) of rainfall in a five-hour period on 14 October. The worst affected town was Villegailhenc in Aude; the river Aude rose to a height of 7.0 m (23 ft) above average, its highest level since 1891, and flooding in Villegailhenc resulted in 14 fatalities. Wind gusts of 11 km/h (6.8 mph; 5.9 kn) and wave heights of 7.60 m (24.9 ft) were recorded in Sète. In total, damage from Leslie in southern France was estimated at more than €220 million.

=== Storm Adrian ===
Adrian
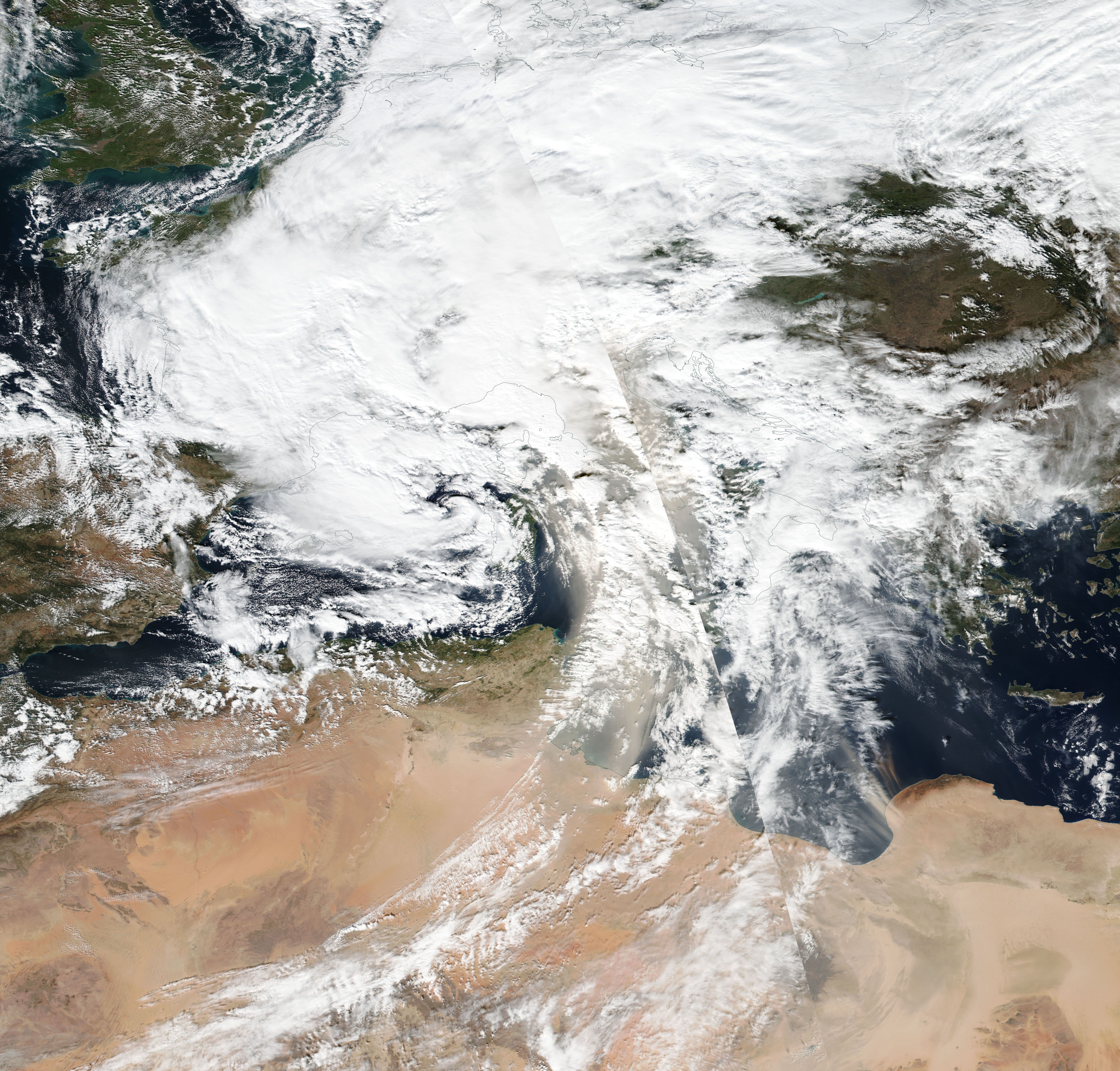
- Area affected: Balearic Islands, Belgium, France, Italy, Netherlands, United Kingdom, Tunisia, Morocco, Algeria
- Date of impact: 27 October–3 November 2018
- Maximum wind gust: 189 km/h (117 mph; 102 kn), Cap Pertusato, France
- Lowest pressure: 977 hPa (28.9 inHg)
- Fatalities: 12
- Power outages: 200,000+
- Damage: ≥ £2.9 billion (≥ €3.3 billion)

Storm Adrian formed on 28 October over the western Mediterranean Sea, becoming the sixth named storm of the season and the first to be named by Météo-France. Adrian strengthened as it tracked between the Balearic Islands and Corsica, later making landfall in Corsica on 29 October with winds gusting up to 189 km/h (117 mph; 102 kn). In the city of Ajaccio, winds gusts of up to 117 km/h (73 mph; 63 kn) were recorded, the second highest ever measured in the city.

Adrian subsequently continued northwards and made landfall along the French Riviera later that day, bringing high winds, heavy rain, thunderstorms and a severe storm surge along the south coast of France. Severe coastal erosion damaged the beaches at Nice. A trailing weather front from Adrian advanced into northern Italy causing severe coastal flooding, the Italian Riviera was severely damaged, the port of Rapallo completely destroyed with two hundred damaged and sunken boats, partially isolated Portofino by land with destruction of the coastal road, while on Adriatic coast, has killed six people in Venice and has damaged the Basilica of San Marco and left 75% of the city underwater; across northern Italy, flooding and landslides from heavy rainfall killed a further four people. Two tornadoes touched down in the centre of Terracina, killing one person and injuring ten others.

Heavy snowfall was reported in central France as the centre of Storm Adrian advanced northwards, and 200,000 houses lost power. 28 departments of central France were placed under an orange alert for severe snow and ice, with up to 15 cm (5.9 in) of snow falling over a wide area and up to 50 cm (20 in) falling over higher ground. A 75-year-old woman was killed and four other people were injured in a multiple-vehicle road accident in Aveyron caused by heavy snowfall.

On 30 October, Adrian continued northwards into Belgium and the Netherlands before emerging into the North Sea, having weakened considerably over land. Late on 30 October, Adrian brought heavy rainfall and moderate winds to south-east England and East Anglia, before moving into the Norwegian Sea and dissipating off the coast of Norway on 31 October. The wider circulation of Adrian additionally caused dust storms in Algeria, Tunisia and Libya starting on 28 October, subsequently directing a dense plume of Saharan dust over Italy on 29 October and into Greece on 30 October.

After emerging into the Norwegian Sea on 1 November, Adrian stalled and re-intensified, slowly drifting towards Iceland. On 3 November, Adrian was absorbed by the remnants of Hurricane Oscar while centred between Iceland and northern Scotland.

=== Storm Beatriz ===
Beatriz
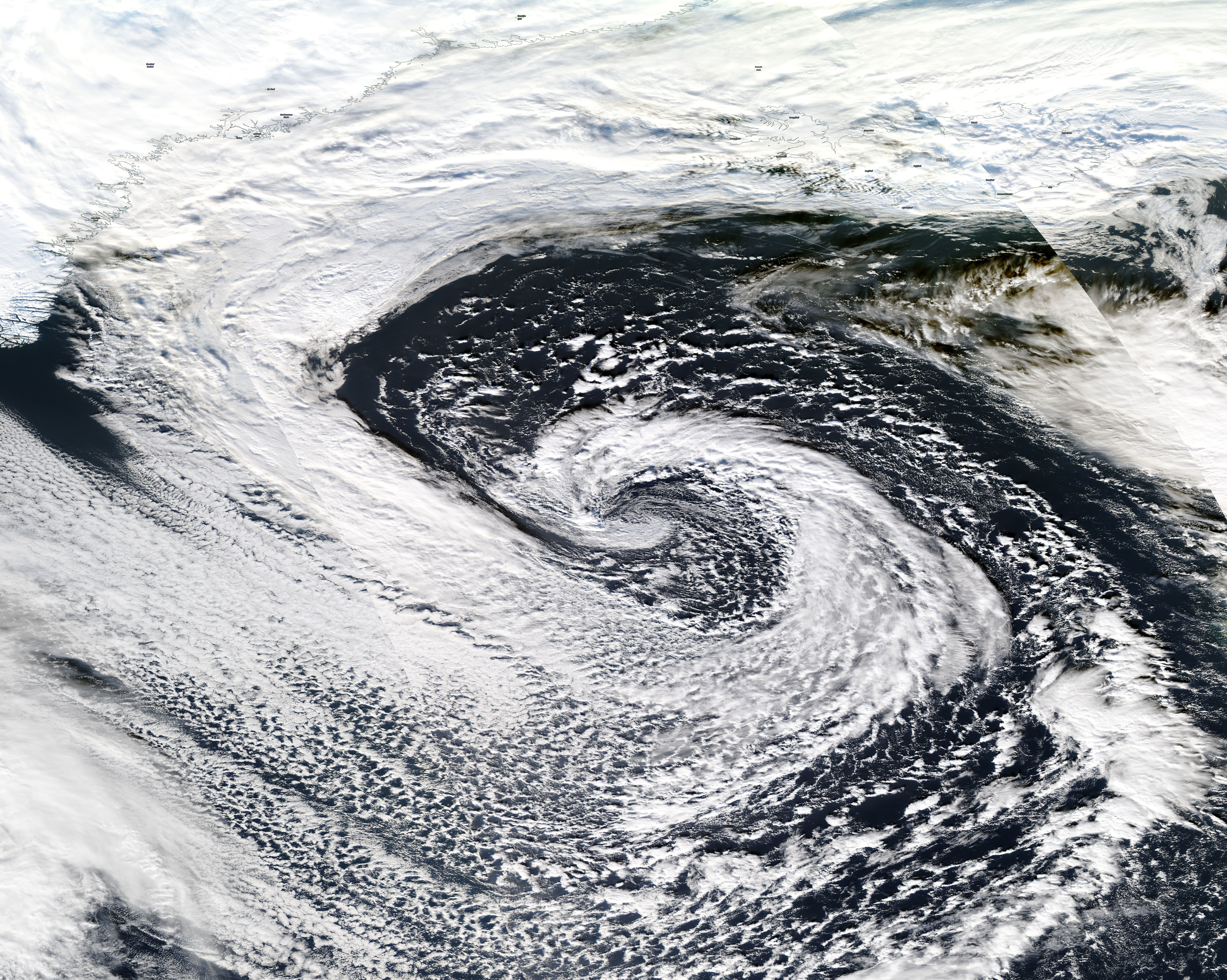
- Area affected: Spain, Portugal
- Date of impact: 5–9 November 2018
- Maximum wind gust: 135 km/h (84 mph; 73 kn)
- Lowest pressure: 960 hPa (28 inHg)
- Damage: Undetermined

Storm Beatriz formed on 6 November over the central Atlantic Ocean, being named by the Agencia Estatal de Meteorología of Spain. Remaining largely stationary over the middle of the Atlantic, Beatriz steadily strengthened, reaching a central pressure of 960 hPa (28 inHg) on 7 November.

Beatriz had been forecasted to bring strong winds and heavy rainfall for northern Spain, France and southern England on 9 November, and weather warnings were issued in advance of the arrival of Beatriz in these areas.

=== Storm Carlos ===
Carlos
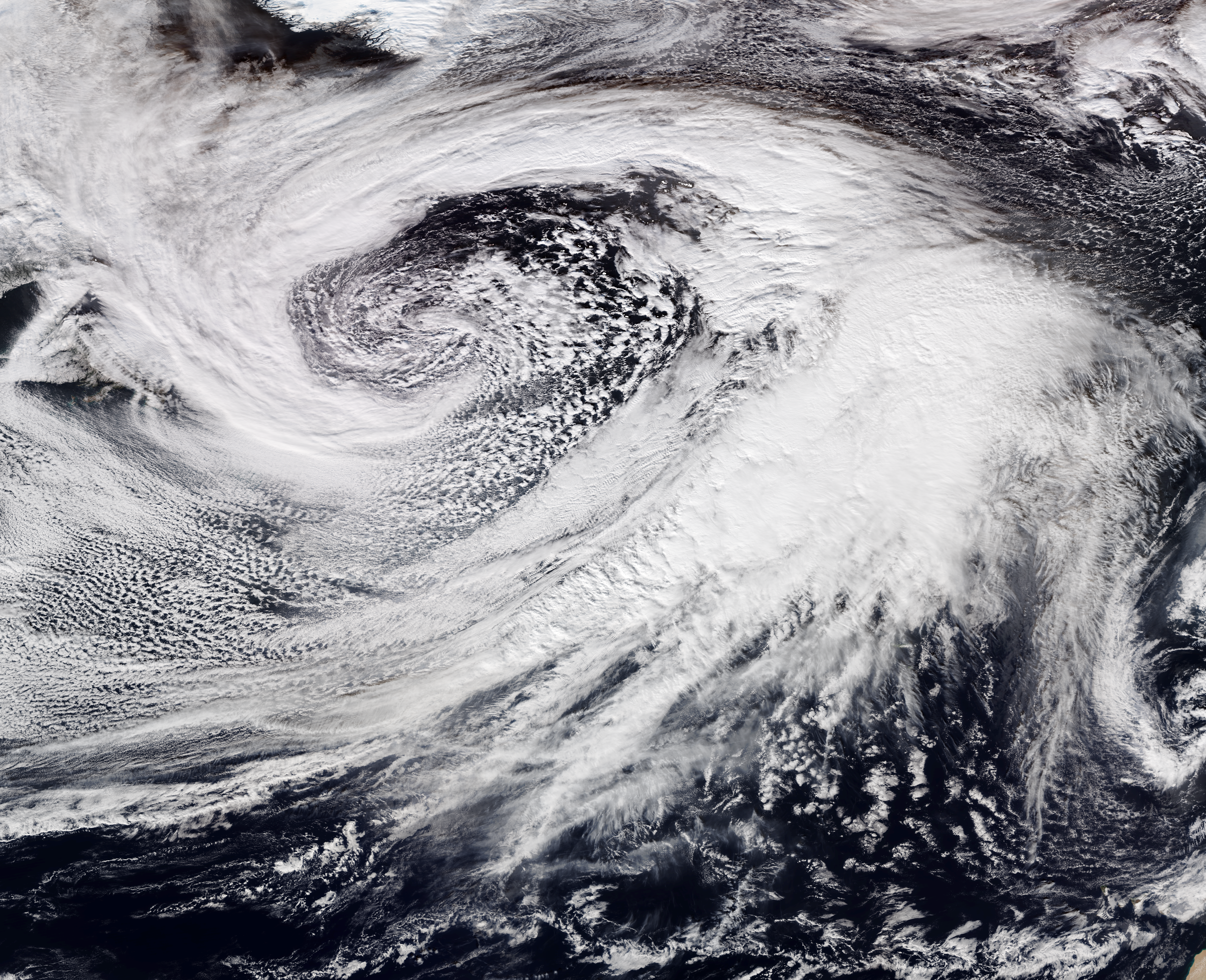
- Area affected: Canary Islands, Portugal, Spain
- Date of impact: 14–18 November 2018
- Maximum wind gust: 96.9 km/h (60.2 mph; 52.3 kn)
- Lowest pressure: 950 hPa (28 inHg)
- Damage: ≥ £111 million (≥ €123 million)

=== Storm Diana ===
Diana
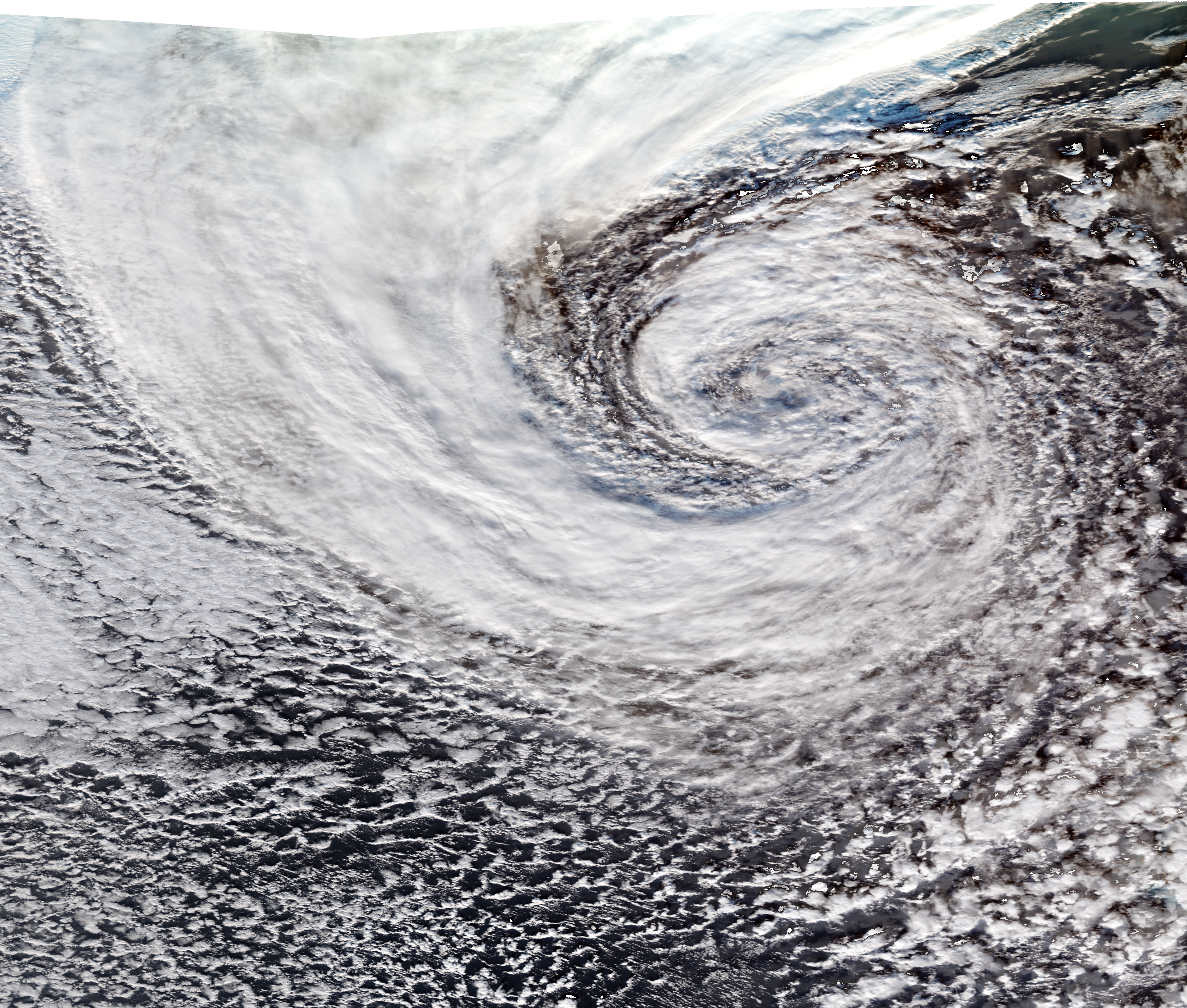
- Area affected: Azores, Ireland, United Kingdom
- Date of impact: 27–30 November 2018
- Maximum wind gust: 180 km/h (112 mph; 97 kn), Cairngorms, United Kingdom
- Lowest pressure: 960 hPa (28 inHg)
- Fatalities: 3
- Damage: Undetermined

Storm Diana was named by the Portuguese Institute of Sea and Atmosphere (IPMA) on 24 November, with an orange warning being issued for the Azores.

=== Storm Etienne ===
Etienne
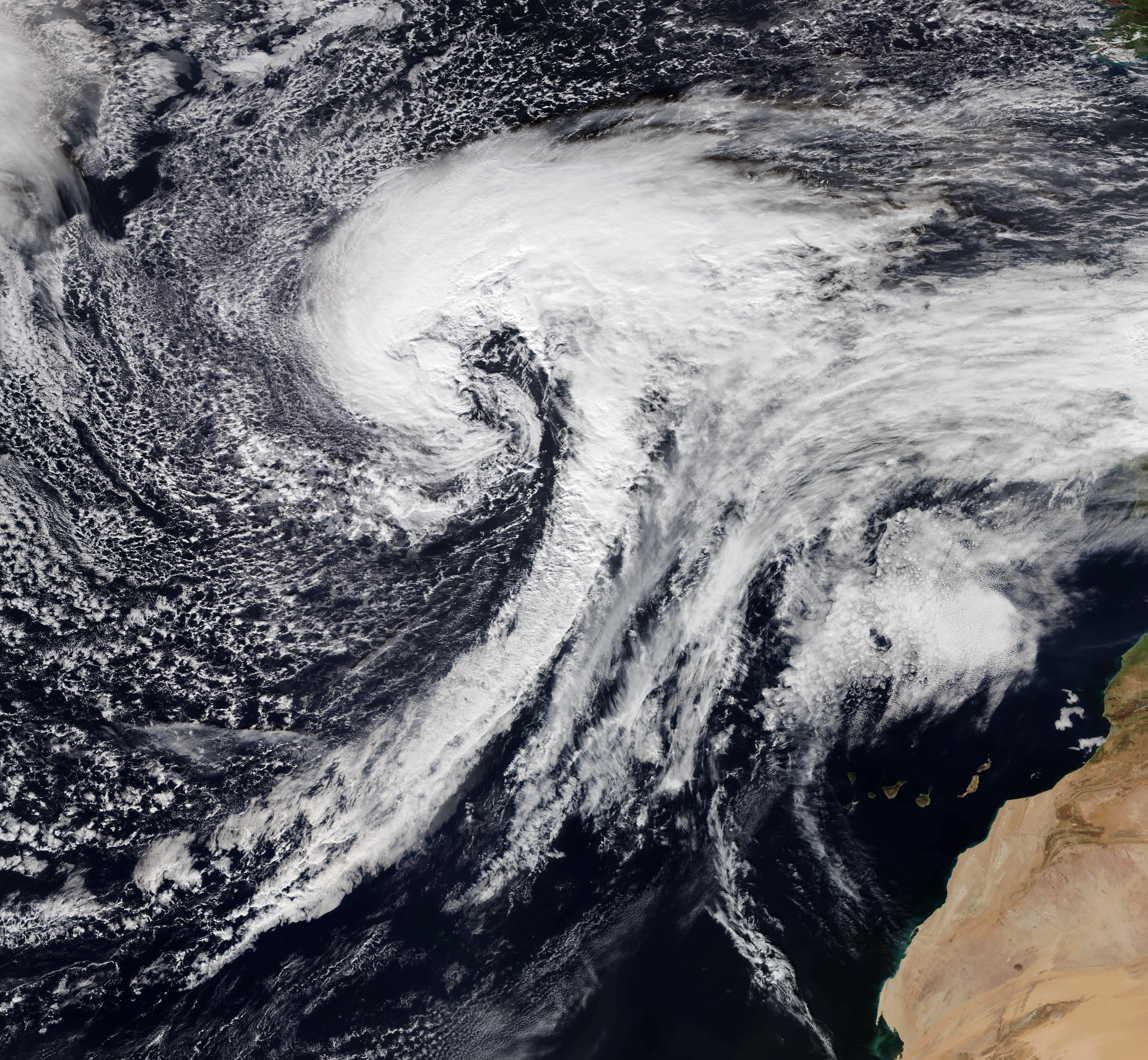
- Date of impact: 4–7 December 2018
- Lowest pressure: 980 hPa (29 inHg)
- Damage: Undetermined

=== Storm Flora ===
Flora
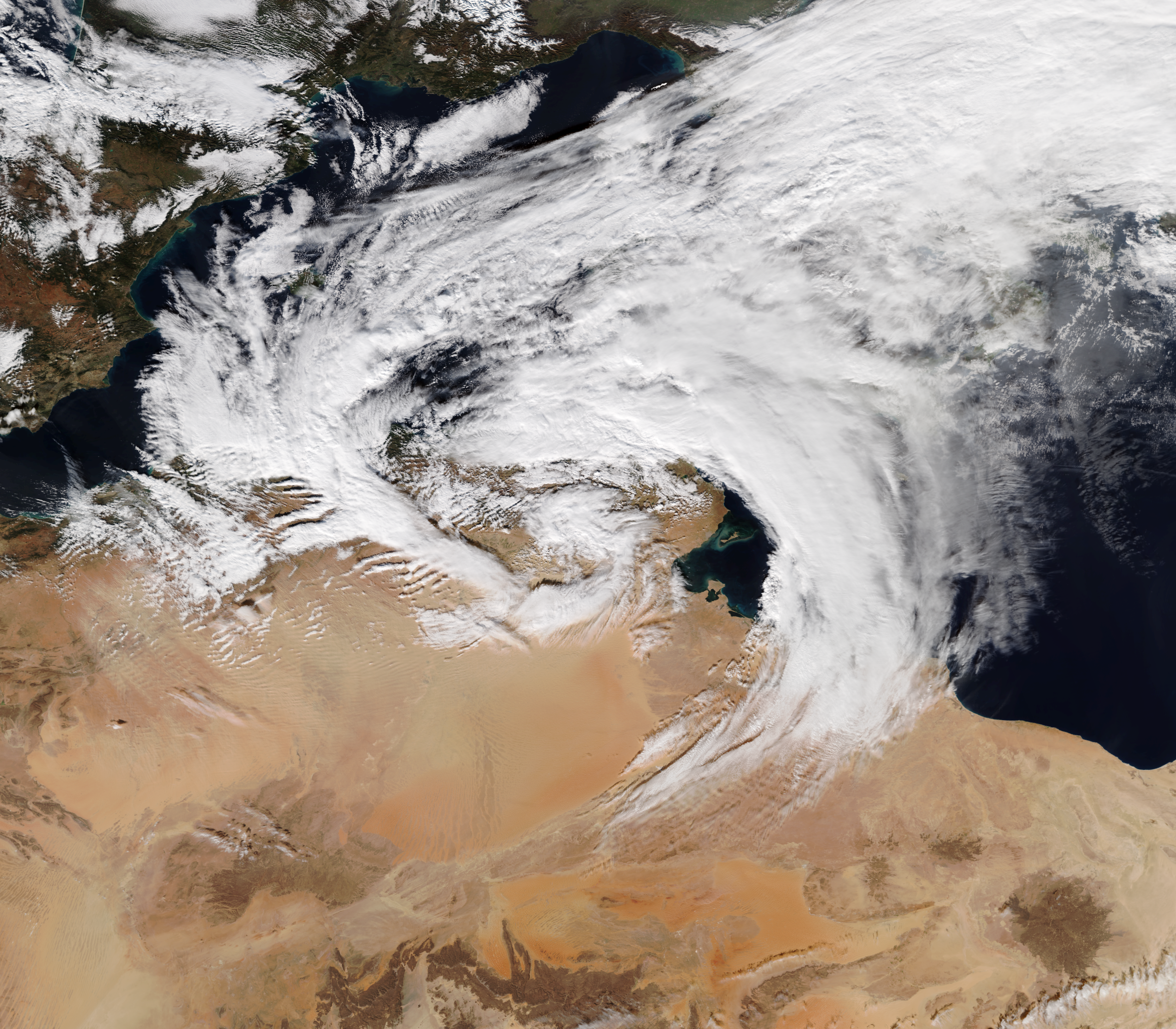
- Area affected: Spain
- Date of impact: 13–17 December 2018
- Maximum wind gust: 208 km/h (129 mph; 112 kn), Laujar de Andarax, Spain
- Lowest pressure: 1,000 hPa (30 inHg)
- Damage: Undetermined

=== Storm Deirdre ===
Deirdre
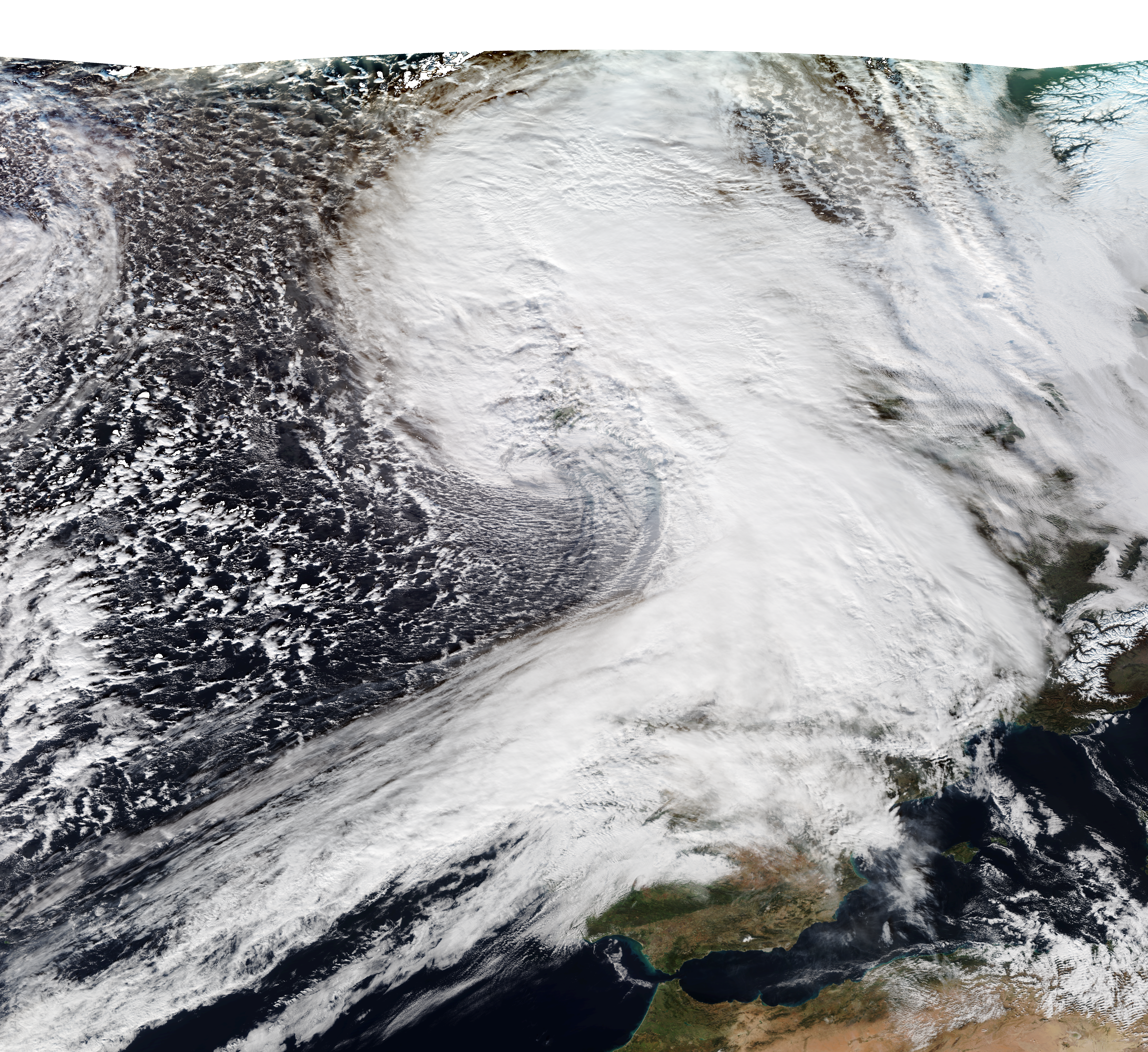
- Area affected: United Kingdom
- Date of impact: 15–17 December 2018
- Maximum wind gust: 127 km/h (79 mph; 69 kn), Aberdaron, United Kingdom
- Lowest pressure: 980 hPa (29 inHg)
- Damage: Undetermined

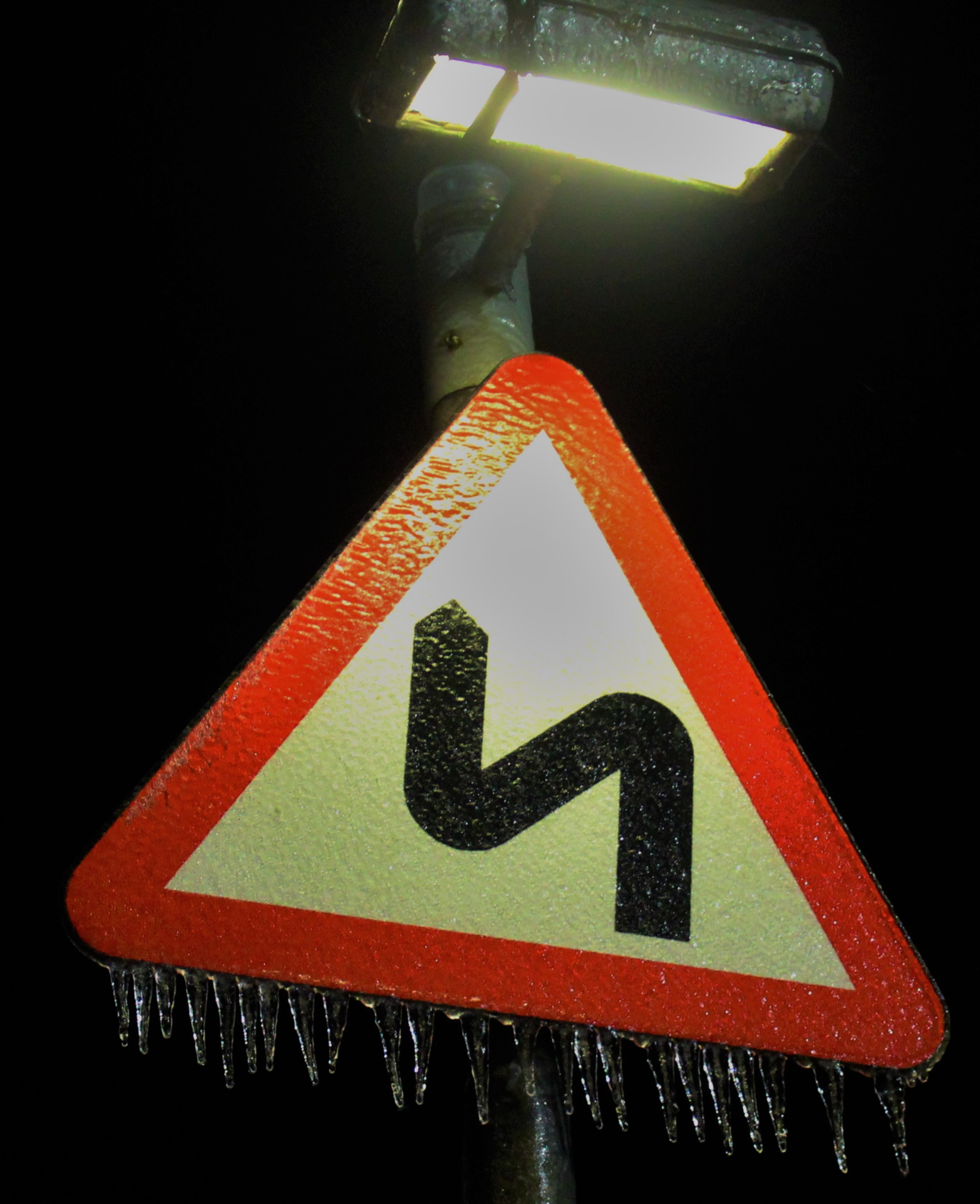
Ice accretion on a road sign left behind by heavy freezing rain from Storm Deirdre in Sheffield

=== Storm Gabriel ===
Gabriel
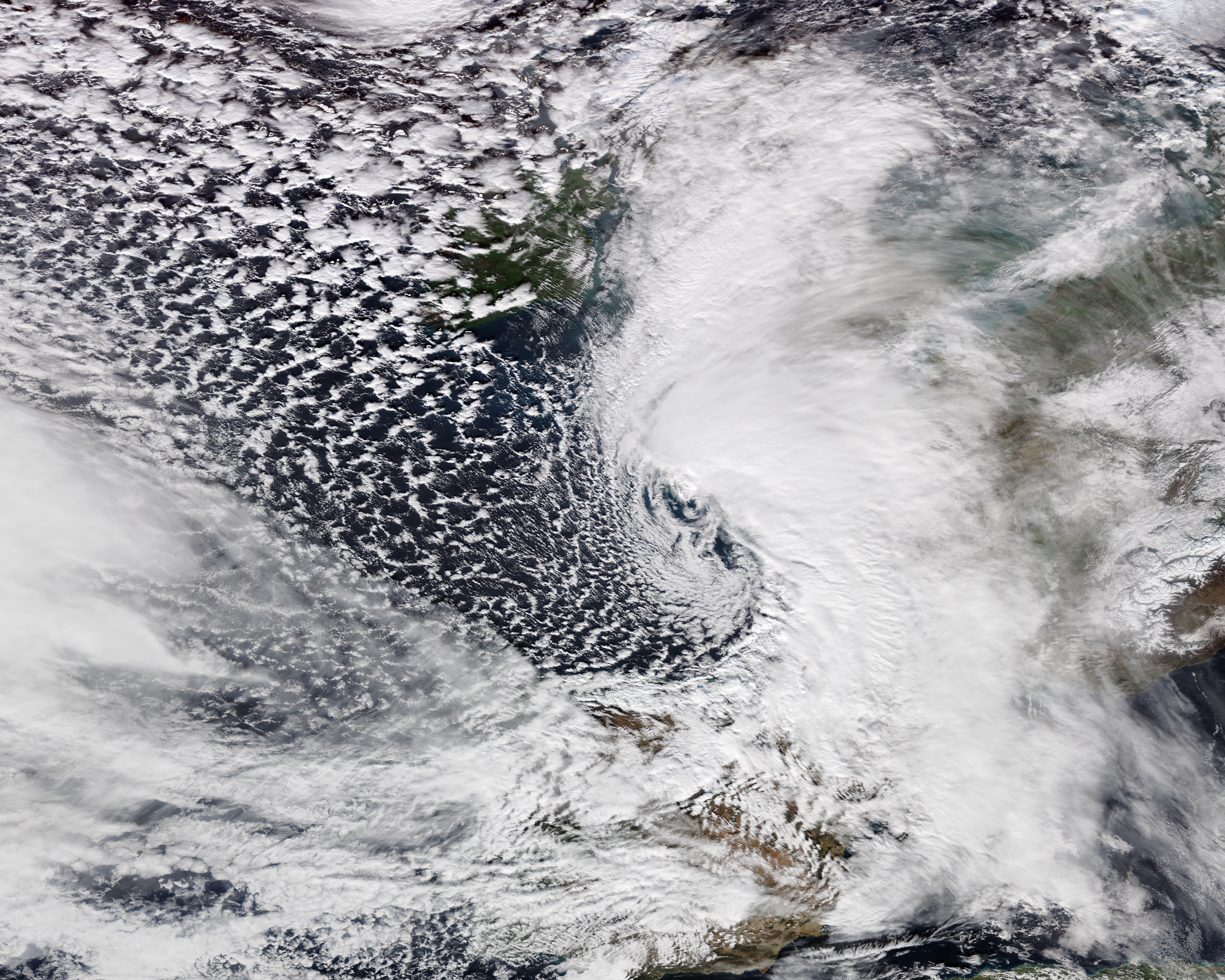
- Area affected: France, Spain, Portugal
- Date of impact: 28–31 January 2019
- Maximum wind gust: 169 km/h (105 mph; 91 kn), Prat-de-Bouc, Cantal, France
- Lowest pressure: 990 hPa (29 inHg)
- Power outages: Unspecified
- Damage: Undetermined

=== Storm Helena ===
Helena
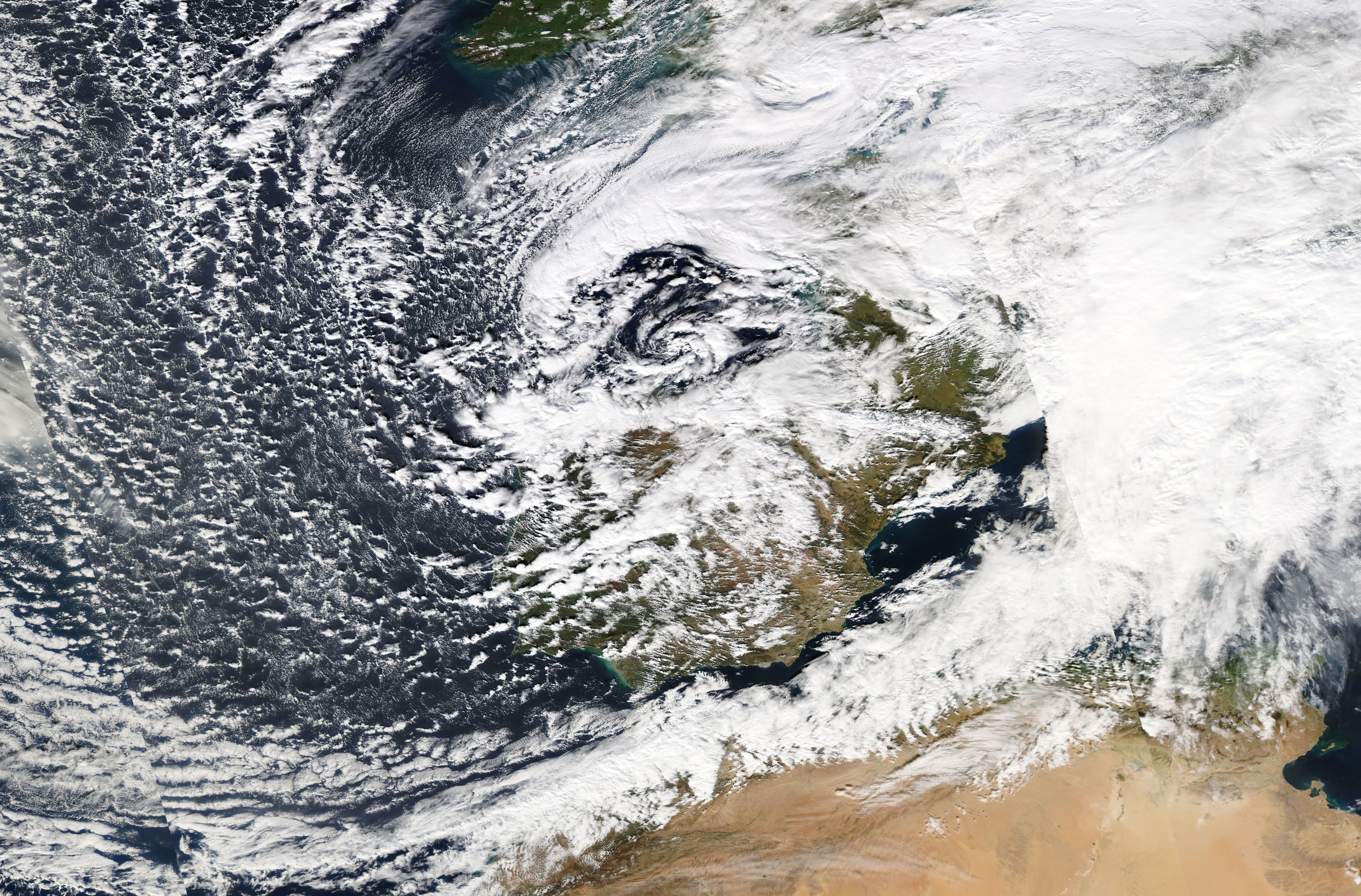
- Area affected: France, Spain, Portugal
- Date of impact: 29 January–5 February 2019
- Maximum wind gust: 183 km/h (114 mph; 99 kn), Cap Béar, Pyrénées-Orientales, France
- Lowest pressure: 970 hPa (29 inHg)
- Damage: Undetermined

=== Storm Erik ===
Erik
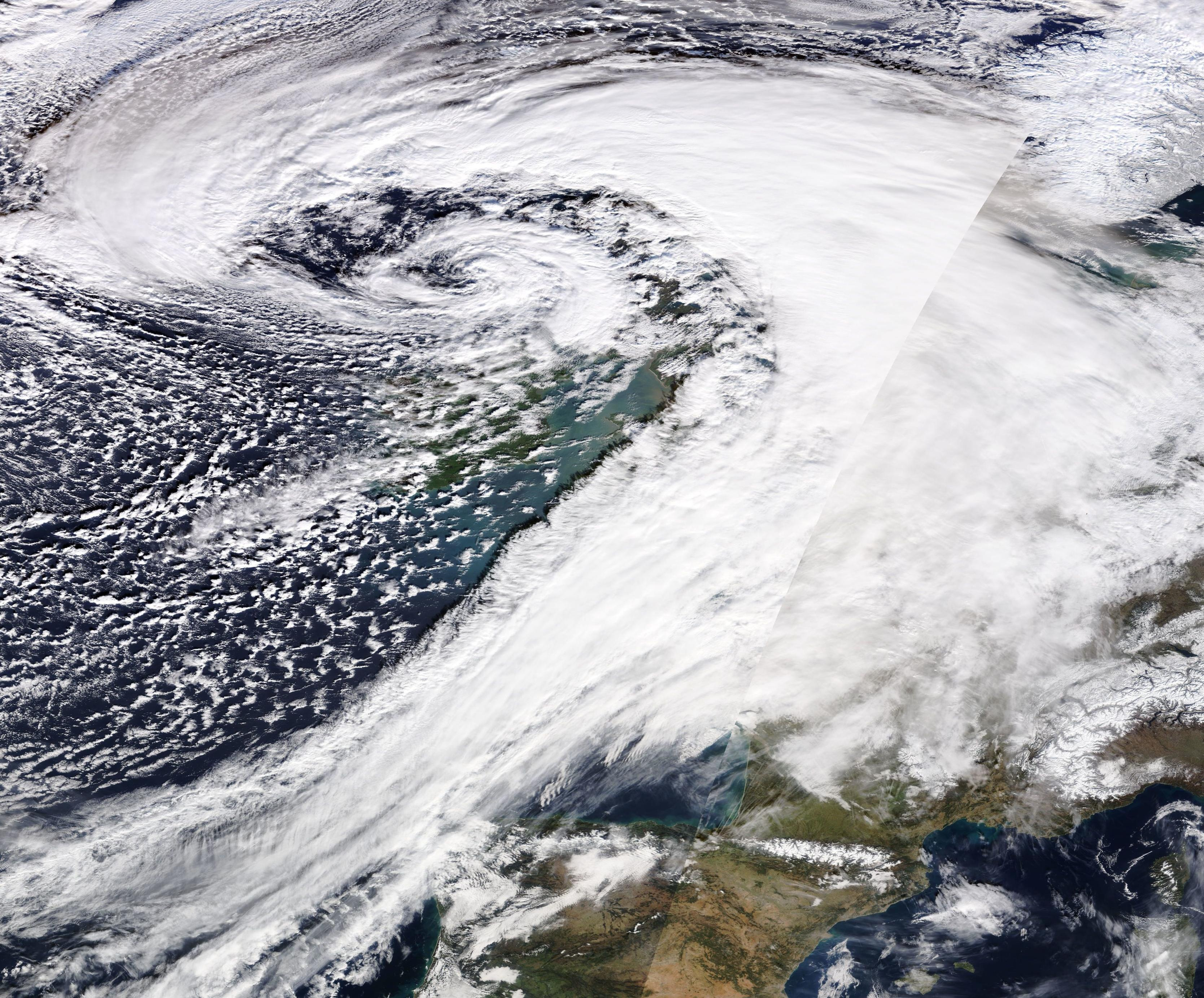
- Area affected: Ireland, United Kingdom
- Date of impact: 7–14 February 2019
- Maximum wind gust: 138 km/h (86 mph; 75 kn) Capel Curig, United Kingdom
- Fatalities: 2
- Damage: Undetermined

=== Storm Isaias ===
Isaias
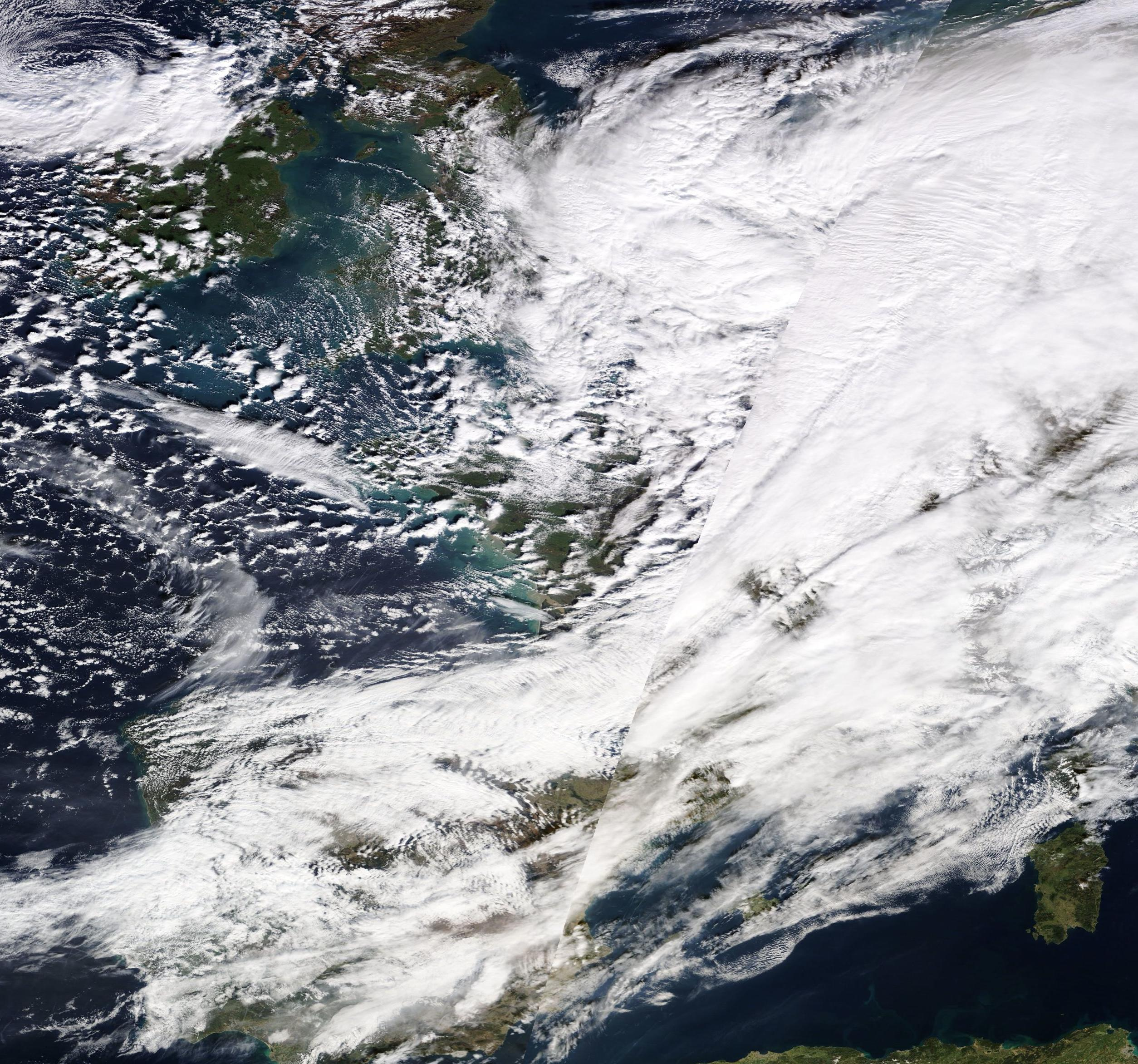
- Area affected: Spain, France, Belgium, Netherlands, Germany, Denmark, Sweden, Finland
- Date of impact: 8–12 February 2019
- Maximum wind gust: 175 km/h (109 mph; 95 kn), Cagnano, France
- Lowest pressure: 987 hPa (29.1 inHg)
- Damage: Undetermined

=== Storm Julia ===
Julia
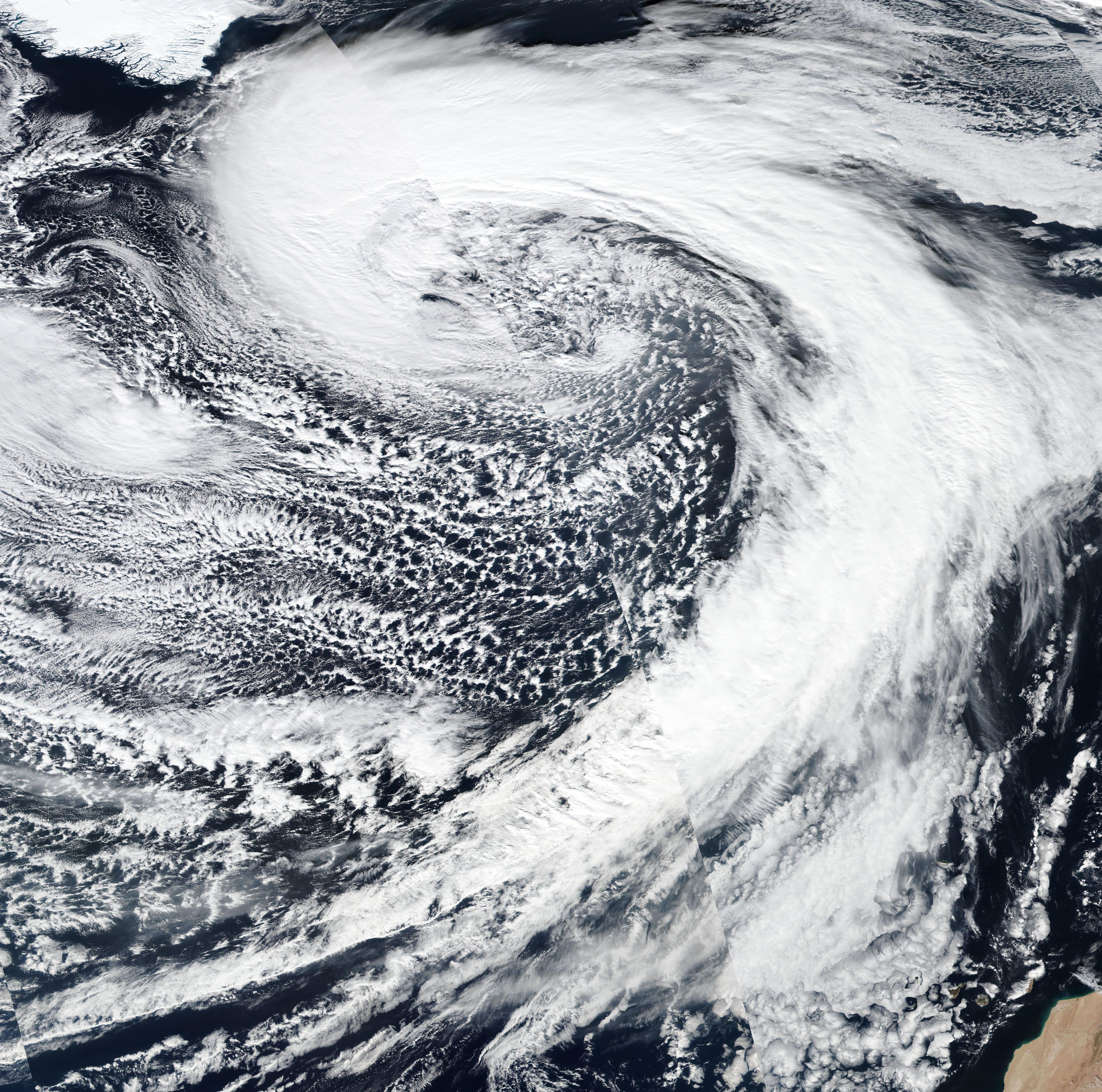
- Area affected: Azores
- Date of impact: 20–21 February 2019
- Lowest pressure: 940 hPa (27.76 inHg)
- Damage: Undetermined

A National Weather Service Ocean Prediction Centre analysis showed the low reaching a nadir of 934 hPa (27.6 inHg).English: NWS OPC synoptic chart of deep low in Atlantic. The UK Met Office produced an analysis chart with the low at 936 hPa (27.6 inHg).

=== Storm Kyllian ===
Kyllian
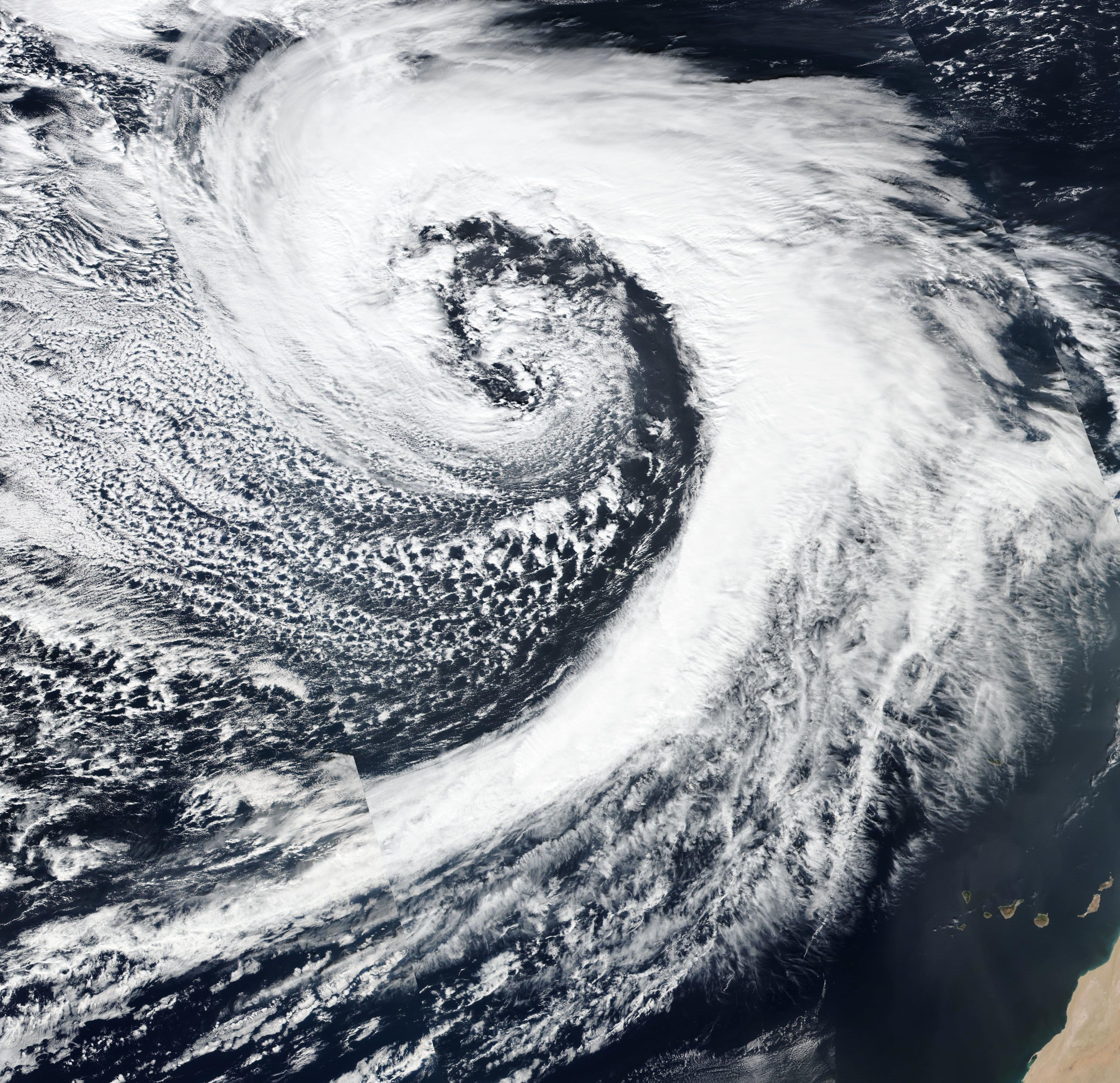
- Area affected: Azores
- Date of impact: 23 February–3 March 2019
- Lowest pressure: 950 to 960 hPa (28.05 to 28.35 inHg)
- Damage: Undetermined

=== Storm Freya ===
Freya
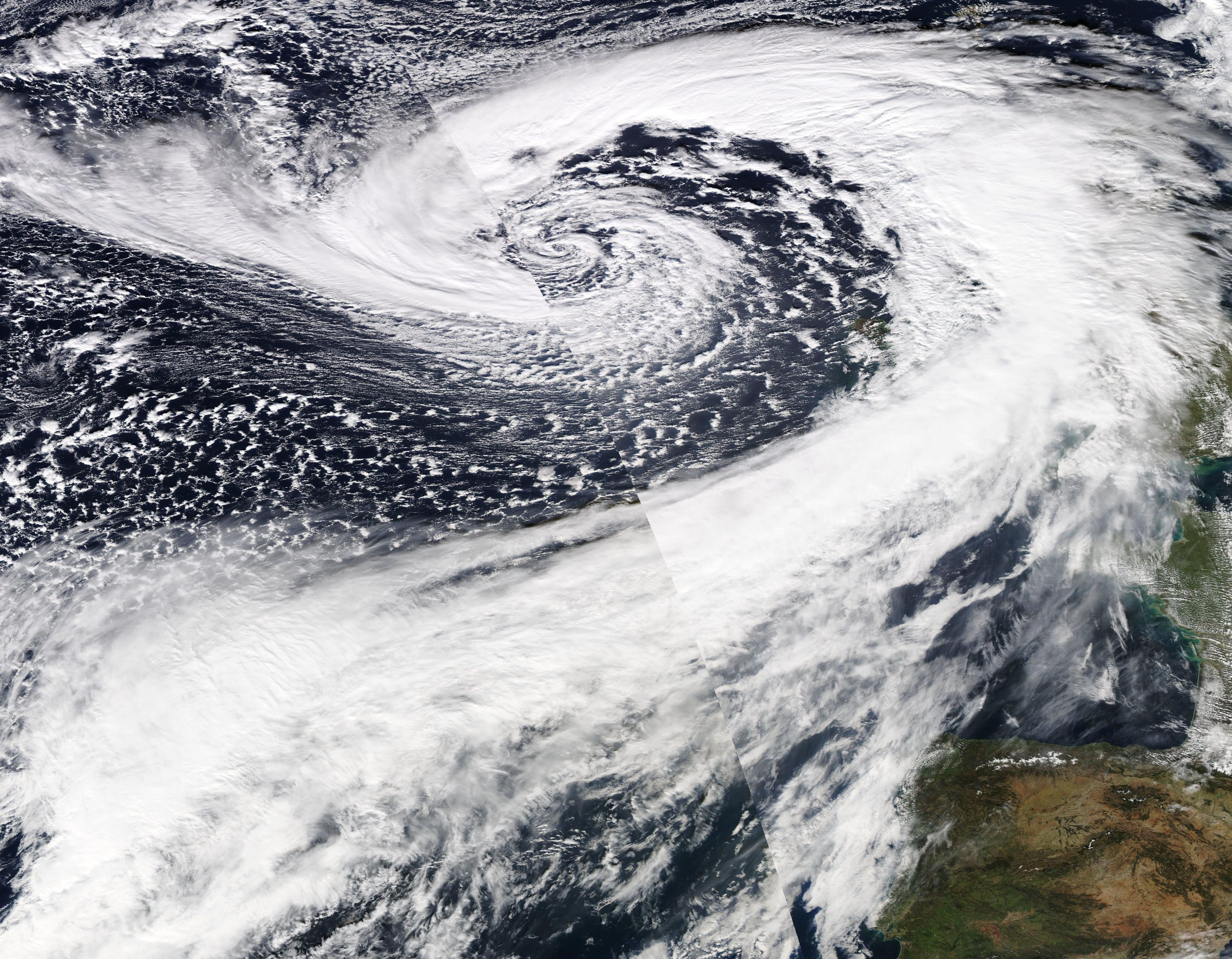
- Area affected: United Kingdom, Germany, France
- Date of impact: 2–7 March 2019
- Maximum wind gust: 152 km/h (94 mph; 82 kn), Corsica, France
- Lowest pressure: 974 hPa (28.8 inHg)
- Fatalities: 2
- Damage: Undetermined

Carnival processions in the German towns of Bottrop and Oberhausen were cancelled. One person died in Ochtrup after their car was hit by a falling tree. A second person died in Kempten.

=== Storm Laura ===
Laura
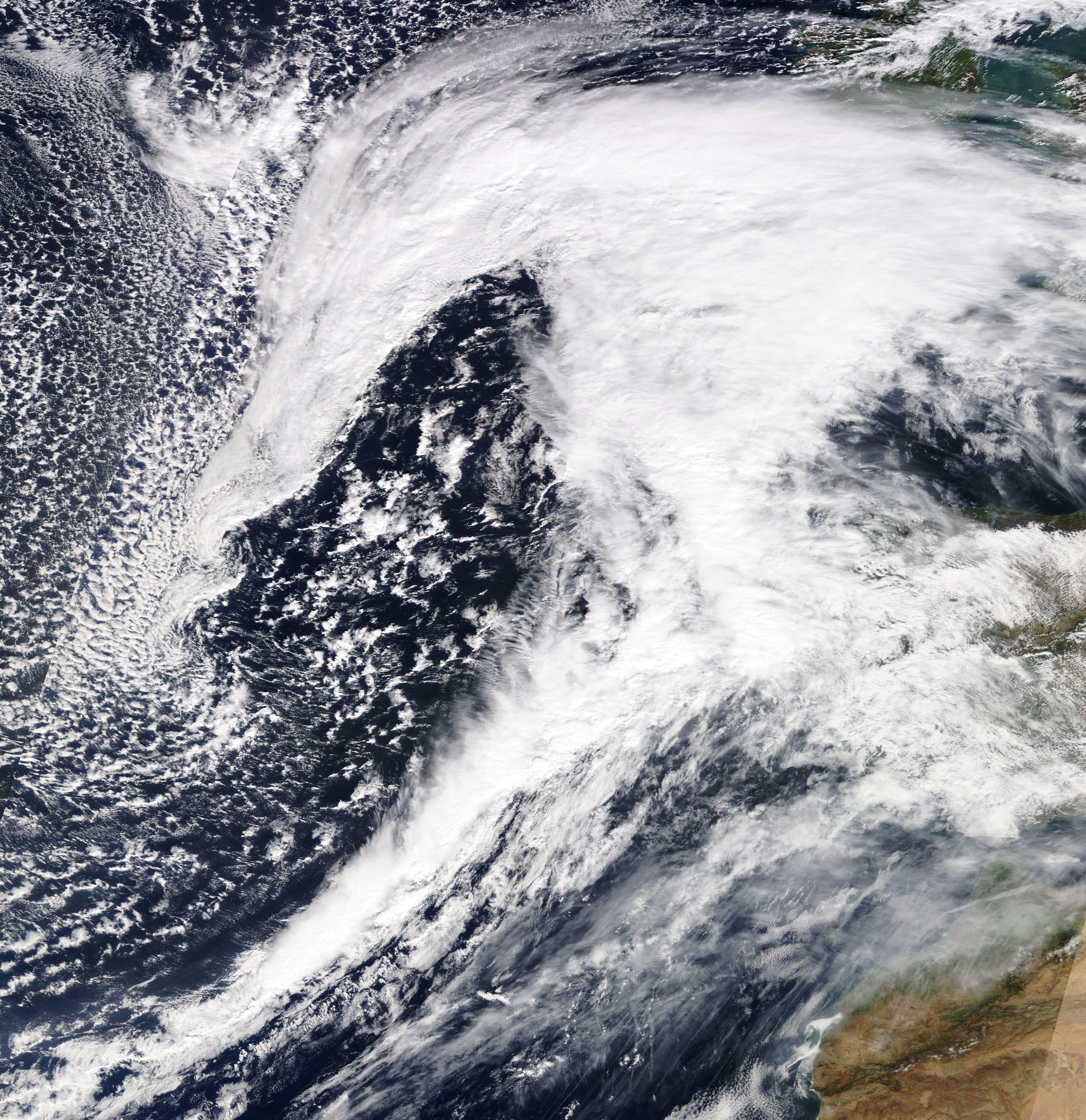
- Area affected: Portugal, Spain, France, Germany
- Date of impact: 4–11 March 2019
- Maximum wind gust: 170 km/h (110 mph; 92 kn), Iraty, France
- Fatalities: 3
- Damage: Undetermined

A storm-related traffic accident in northern Germany caused three deaths.

A wind gust of 244 km/h (152 mph; 132 kn) was measured at 3,845 m (12,615 ft) on Aiguille du Midi, a new record since measurements began in 1993 on that mountain. The old record of 225 km/h (140 mph; 121 kn) dated back to 11 January 2008.

=== Storm Gareth ===
Gareth
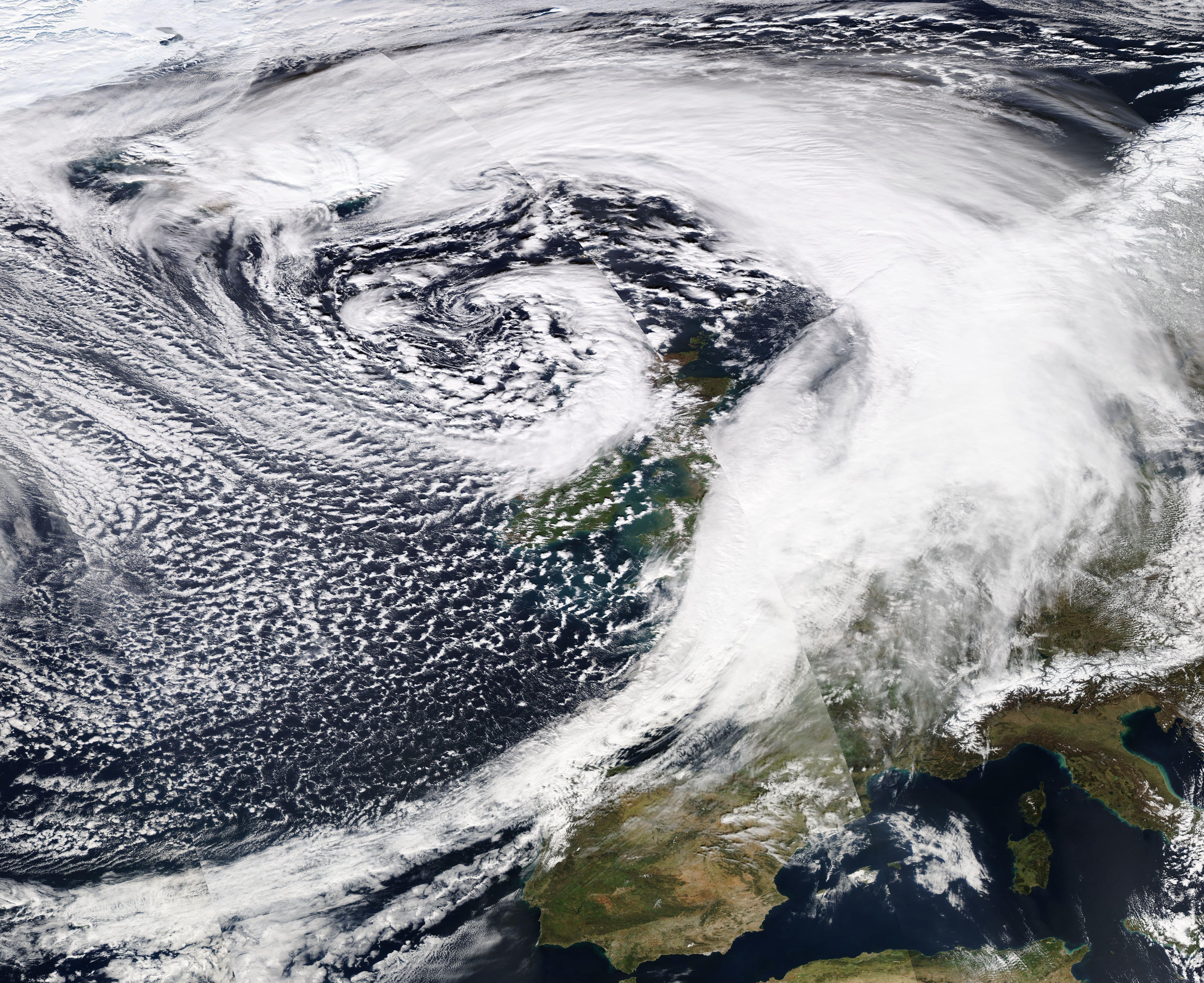
- Area affected: Ireland, United Kingdom
- Date of impact: 11–14 March 2019
- Maximum wind gust: 130 km/h (81 mph; 70 kn), Malin Head, County Donegal, Ireland
- Lowest pressure: 971 hPa (28.7 inHg)
- Damage: Undetermined

Gareth experienced explosive cyclogenesis when, between 10 and 11 March, its central pressure fell 37 hPa (1.1 inHg) in 24 hours.

=== Storm Hannah ===
Hannah
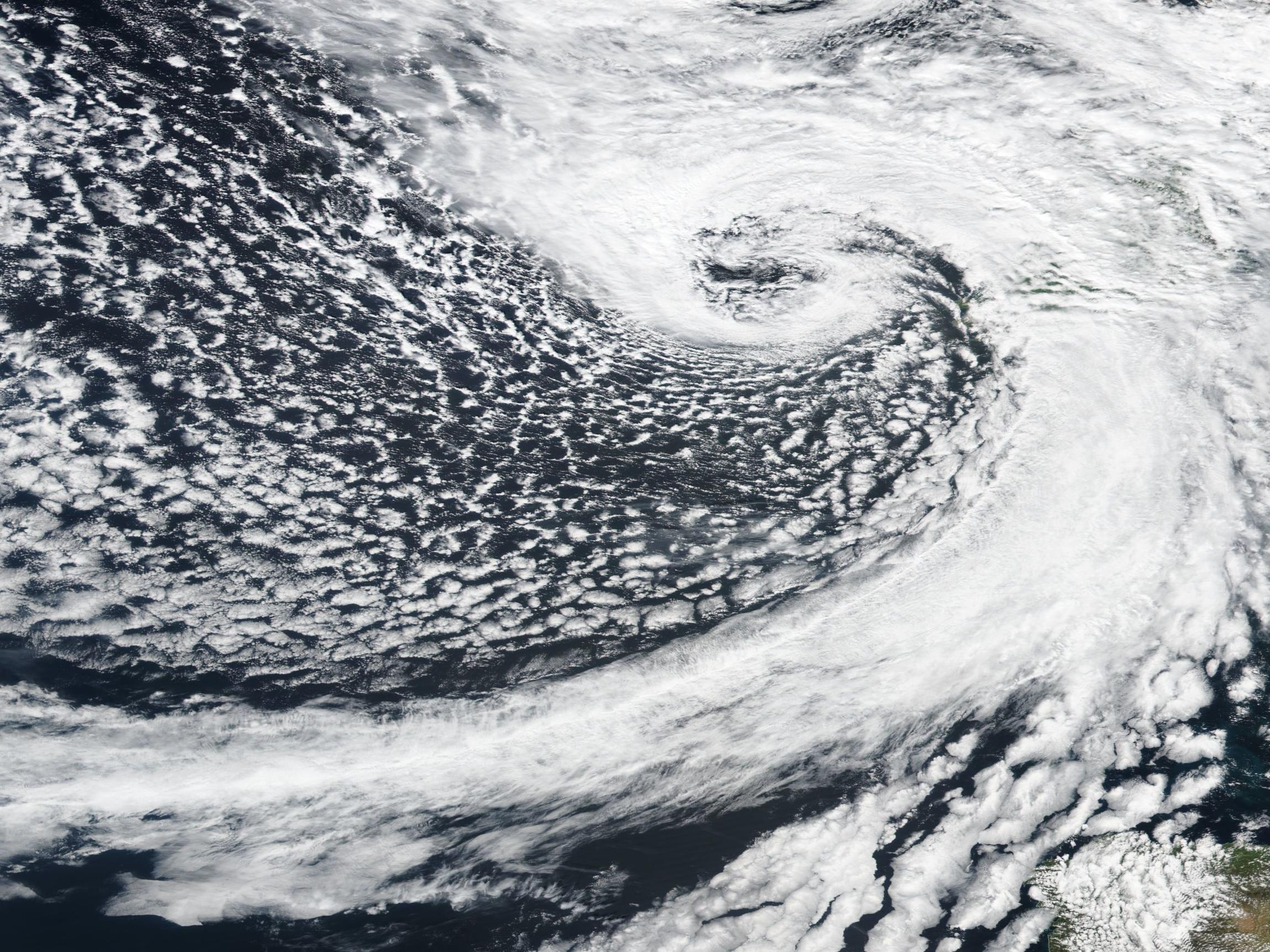
- Area affected: Ireland, United Kingdom
- Date of impact: 25–28 April 2019
- Maximum wind gust: 132 km/h (82 mph; 71 kn), Aberdaron, Wales, United Kingdom
- Lowest pressure: 984 hPa (29.1 inHg)
- Power outages: 32,000+ (Ireland), several thousand in Wales
- Damage: Undetermined

=== Storm Miguel ===
Miguel
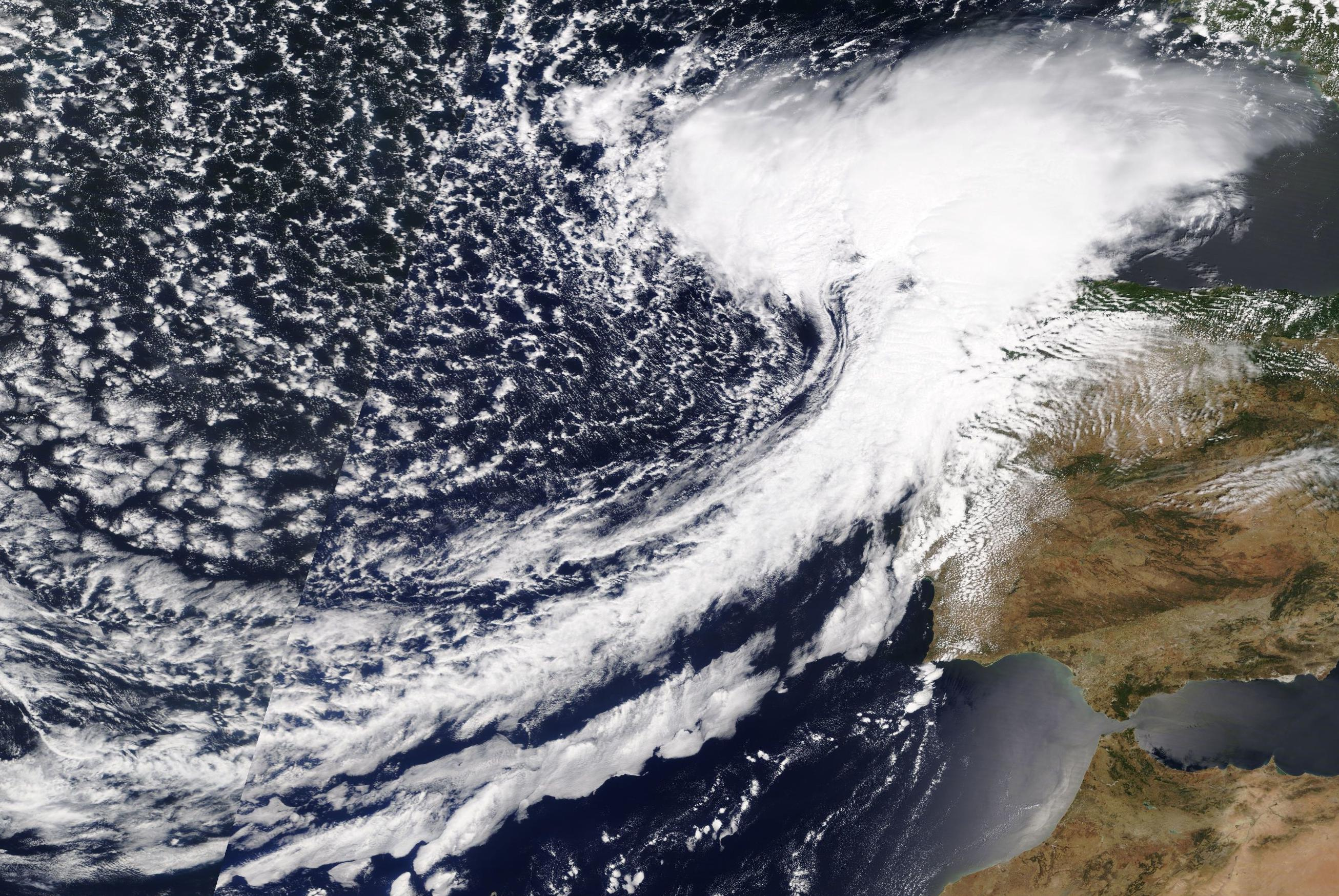
- Area affected: Portugal, Spain, France, United Kingdom, Netherlands
- Date of impact: 5–12 June 2019
- Maximum wind gust: 129 km/h (80 mph; 70 kn), Île d'Yeu, France & Pointe de Chémoulin, Saint-Marc-sur-Mer, France
- Lowest pressure: ≤988 hPa (29.2 inHg)
- Damage: Undetermined

On 5 June, the Spanish Met Agency named Miguel. It was expected to hit the UK from 7 to 13 June 2019.

On 7 June, storm Miguel produced gusts up to 129 km/h (80 mph; 70 kn) at the Atlantic coast of France. At Île d'Yeu, France, one of these gusts set a record for the month of June, last set in 1981.

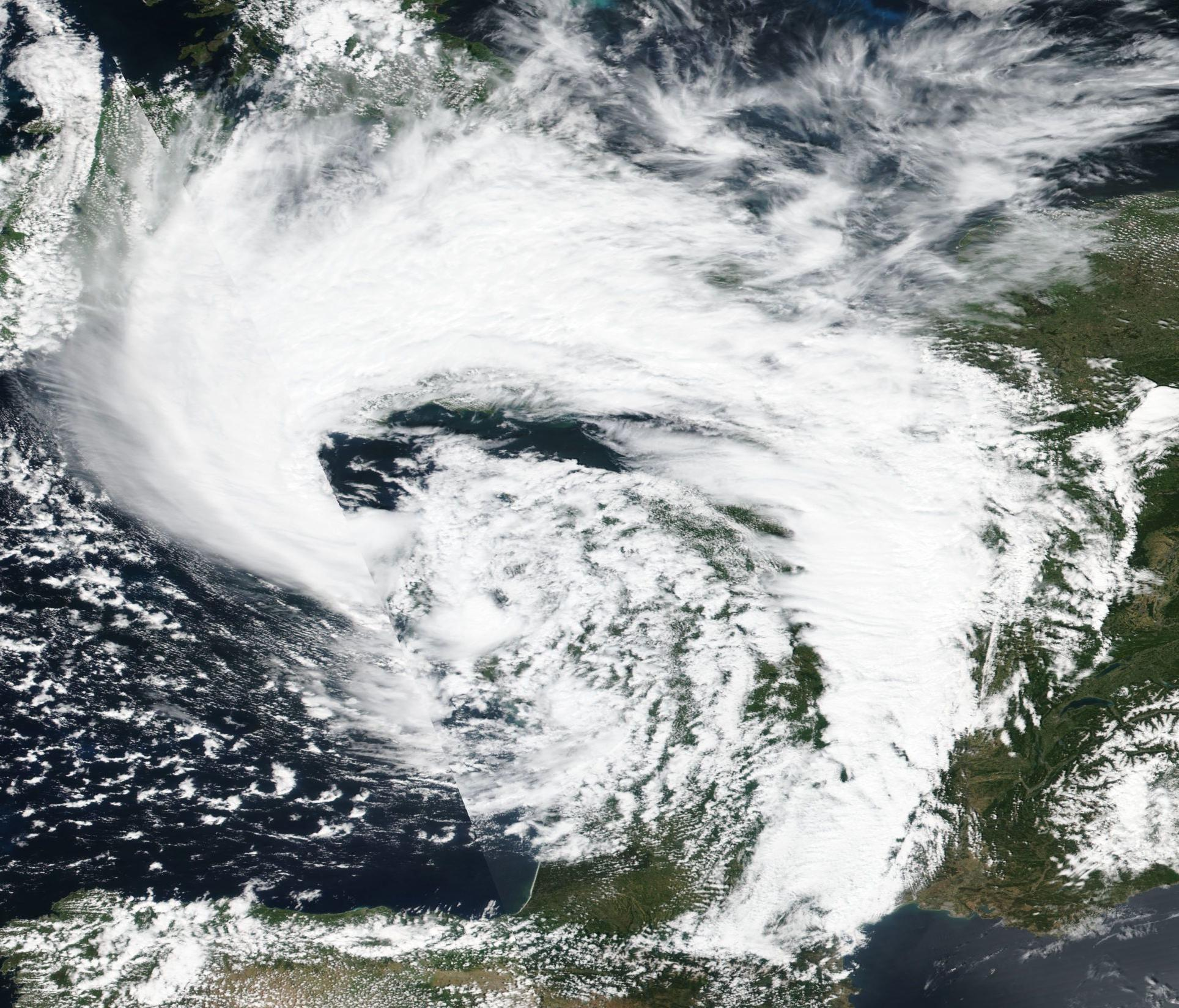
Miguel at the Atlantic coast of France on 7 June.

== Other systems ==
The fully extratropical remnants of Tropical Storm Ernesto crossed Ireland and the United Kingdom on 18–19 August, bringing heavy rainfall and winds of up to 64 km/h (40 mph; 35 kn), unseasonably strong for the time of year. The heavy rainfall from the remnants of Ernesto caused some flooding across the two countries. Additionally, Ernesto dragged up warm tropical air over the British Isles, resulting in unusually warm and humid weather. No warnings were issued in advance of Ernesto by either Met Éireann or the Met Office, and no damage was reported.

Cyclone Fabienne, named by the Free University of Berlin, affected Germany on 23 September with winds of up to 158 km/h (98 mph; 85 kn), causing widespread damage across southern and central Germany. One person, a 78-year-old woman, was killed after being struck by a falling tree at a campsite in Bamberg. A four-year-old boy suffered critical injuries after being struck by a falling tree in Epfenbach. Structural damage to properties was reported from a possible tornado in Erzgebirgskreis. Air and rail travel was disrupted across Germany, Austria and Switzerland due to high winds and fallen trees on train tracks. In the Czech Republic, more than 140,000 buildings were left without power during the height of Fabienne overnight on 23–24 September, and 23 buildings in Prague suffered structural damage. Two people were injured in Olomouc when a tree fell into their house.

Cyclone Zorbas formed over the Mediterranean Sea on 25 September. Beginning on 27 September, the system began to acquire some subtropical and then tropical characteristics, becoming a Mediterranean tropical-like cyclone. Heavy rainfall from Zorbas resulted in flash flooding which killed five people in Tunisia and three people in Greece.

Storm Kuisma (named by the Finnish Meteorological Institute; FUB: Gertraud) made landfall in southern Finland on 27 September, causing a storm surge of up to 123 cm (48 in) in Hamina and 92 cm (36 in) in Helsinki. The storm surge and heavy rainfall resulted in some coastal flooding. Kuisma brought winds gusting up to 114 km/h (71 mph; 61.6 kn; 31.7 m/s), bringing down trees and power lines; however, damage was lower than initially expected. Around 4,500 properties were left without power.

Storm Alfrida (named by the Swedish Meteorological and Hydrological Institute; FUB: Zeetje) crossed northern Europe on 1–2 January. In Denmark, high winds from Alfrida were involved in blowing a semi-trailer off a freight train on the Great Belt Fixed Link, resulting in a collision with a passenger train in which eight people were killed and sixteen more were injured. Experts however considered the wind speed measured at the bridge, a strong gale, to be insufficient for causing the accident by itself, which was confirmed in the official report by Accident Investigation Board Denmark where it was found that it only could happen because of a locking mechanism on the freight train that did not function properly. In Sweden, where winds gusting up to 110 km/h (67 mph; 58 kn; 30 m/s) were recorded, a commuter train collided with fallen trees along the Saltsjöbanan railway near Stockholm, although there were no injuries. The entire phone network on the island of Gotland was taken offline due to damage from Alfrida, and more than 100,000 homes were left without power in mainland Sweden. Power outages continued for over 30,000 homes across Sweden three days after the passage of Alfrida.

On 10 March, Storm Eberhard moved across the Netherlands, Belgium and central Germany. It caused one death in Belgium and one in Germany. 700.000 Households were without electricity in Poland and Czechia. On 11 March the Storm caused two deaths in Ukraine.

== Season effects ==
Storm	Dates active	Highest wind gust	Lowest pressure	Casualties	Damage	Affected areas
Helene	16–21 September	126 km/h (78 mph; 68 kn)	987 hPa (29.1 inHg)	None	Unknown	Portugal, Spain, United Kingdom, Ireland
Ali	17–22 September	164 km/h (102 mph; 89 kn)	967 hPa (28.6 inHg)	2	≥ £7.9 million (≥ €8.8 million)	Ireland, United Kingdom, Norway
Bronagh	20–25 September	154 km/h (96 mph; 83 kn)	969 hPa (28.6 inHg)	None	≥ £7.9 million (≥ €8.8 million)	Ireland, United Kingdom, Norway, Denmark, Germany, Poland
Callum	10–16 October	122 km/h (76 mph; 66 kn)	938 hPa (27.7 inHg)	3	Unknown	Ireland, United Kingdom, Wales
Leslie	13–15 October	180 km/h (110 mph; 96 kn)	984 hPa (29.1 inHg)	15	≥ £395 million (≥ €440 million)	Portugal, Spain, France
Adrian	27 October–3 November	188 km/h (117 mph; 102 kn)	977 hPa (28.9 inHg)	12	≥ £2.9 billion (≥ €3.3 billion)	Belgium, France, Italy, Netherlands, Spain, United Kingdom
Beatriz	5–9 November	135 km/h (84 mph; 73 kn)	960 hPa (28 inHg)	None	Unknown	Iberian Peninsula
Carlos	14–18 November	97 km/h (60 mph; 52 kn)	950 hPa (28 inHg)	None	≥ £111 million (≥ €123 million)	Canary Islands, Portugal, Spain
Diana	27–30 November	180 km/h (110 mph; 96 kn)	960 hPa (28 inHg)	None	Unknown	Azores, Ireland, United Kingdom
Etienne	4–7 December	Unknown	980 hPa (29 inHg)	None	Unknown	Unknown
Flora	13–17 December	130 km/h (80 mph; 70 kn)	1,000 hPa (30 inHg)	None	Unknown	Spain
Deirdre	15–17 December	127 km/h (79 mph; 69 kn)	980 hPa (29 inHg)	None	Unknown	United Kingdom
Gabriel	28–31 January	169 km/h (105 mph; 91 kn)	990 hPa (29 inHg)	None	Unknown	France, Spain, Portugal
Helena	29 January–5 February	183 km/h (114 mph; 99 kn)	970 hPa (29 inHg)	None	Unknown	France, Spain, Portugal
Erik	7–14 February	138 km/h (86 mph; 75 kn)	Unknown	2	Unknown	Ireland, United Kingdom
Isaias	8–12 February	175 km/h (109 mph; 95 kn)	981 hPa (29.0 inHg)	None	Unknown	Spain, France, Belgium, Netherlands, Germany, Denmark, Sweden, Finland
Julia	20–21 February	Unknown	940 hPa (28 inHg)	None	Unknown	Azores
Kyllian	23 February–3 March	Unknown	950–960 hPa (28–28 inHg)	None	Unknown	Azores
Freya	2–7 March	151 km/h (94 mph; 82 kn)	974 hPa (28.8 inHg)	2	Unknown	United Kingdom, Germany
Laura	4–11 March	180 km/h (110 mph; 96 kn)	Unknown	3	Unknown	Portugal, Spain, France, Germany
Gareth	11–14 March	130 km/h (81 mph; 70 kn)	971 hPa (28.7 inHg)	None	Unknown	Ireland, United Kingdom, Northern Europe
Hannah	25–28 April	132 km/h (82 mph; 71 kn)	984 hPa (29.1 inHg)	None	Unknown	Ireland, United Kingdom
Miguel	5–12 June	130 km/h (80 mph; 70 kn)	≤ 988 hPa (29.2 inHg)	None	Unknown	Portugal, Spain, France, United Kingdom, Netherlands
23 windstorms	16 September 2018 – 12 June 2019	188 km/h (117 mph; 102 kn)	938 hPa (27.7 inHg)	39	≥ £3.42 billion (≥ €3.81 billion)	

== Co-ordination of storms named by European meteorological services ==
2018–19 named storms table (dates of impact)
Ali (UK/IE), Dorcas (Free University of Berlin) 19 September 2018.
Bronagh (UK/IE), Elena (FUB), Knud (Danish Meteorological Institute, also Norway and Sweden), Mauri 18 (Finland). 19–20 September 2018.
Fabienne (FUB) 23 September 2018.
Kuisma (Finland), Gertraud (FUB) 26 September 2018.
Callum (UK/IE), Nevine (FUB) 11–12 October 2018.
Adrian (Météo-France) – a Mediterranean storm, Vaia (FUB).
Beatriz (AEMET), Yaprak II (FUB).
Carlos (IPMA), Cornelia (FUB) 15 November 2018.
Diana (IPMA), Halka (FUB).
Etienne (IPMA), Luana (FUB) 4 December 2018.
Flora (IPMA), Nadiia (FUB) 13 December 2018.
Deirdre (UK/IE), Oswalde (FUB) 15–16 December 2018.
Alfrida (Swedish Meteorological and Hydrological Institute), Zeetje (FUB), Aapeli (Finnish Meteorological Institute), 1–2 January 2019
Jan (SMHI), Donald (FUB), 11 January 2019.
Gabriel (FrEsPt), Oskar (FUB), 29–30 Jan 2019.
Helena (IPMA), Pirmin (FUB), 1 February 2019.
Erik (UK/IE), Thomas (FUB), 8 February 2019.
Isaias (MeteoFrance), Uwe (FUB), 10 February 2019.
Julia (SMHI), Unnamed (FUB), 16 February 2019.
Julia (IPMA), Unnamed (FUB), 19 February 2019.
Kyllian (IPMA), Unnamed (FUB), 21 February 2019.
Mats (SMHI), Unnamed (FUB), 24 February 2019.
Freya (UK/IE), Bennet (FUB), 3–4 March 2019.
Laura (IPMA), Cornelius (FUB), 6 March 2019
Eberhard (FUB), 10 March 2019.
Gareth (UK/IE), Franz (FUB), 12–13 March 2019.
Hannah (UK/IE), Uli (FUB), 26–27 April 2019.
Miguel (AEMET), Ivan (FUB), 6 June 2019.
