= Storm Adrian =

2018 weather event

Storm Adrian / Storm Vaia
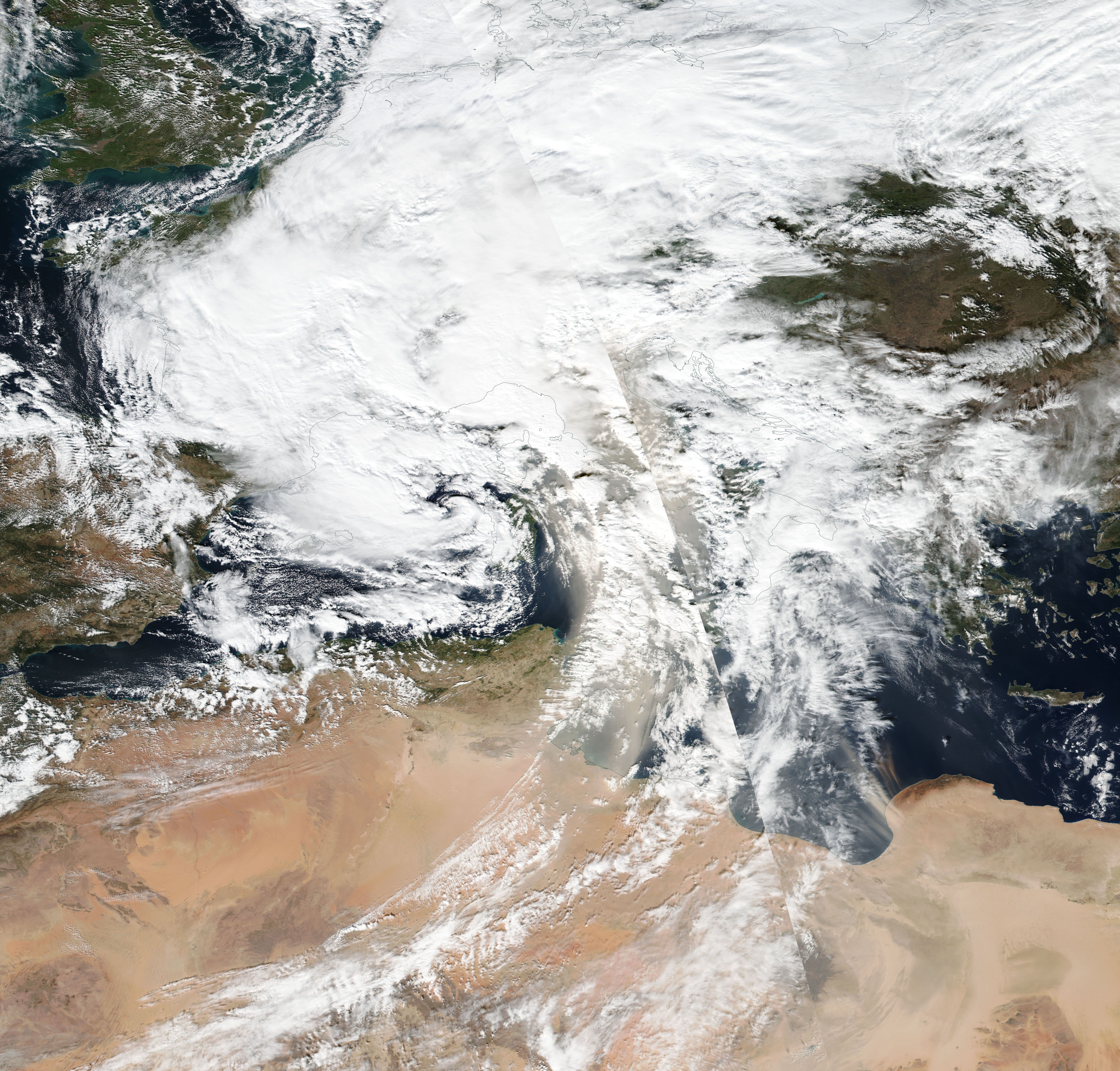
- Windstorm Adrian-Vaia strengthening over the Western Mediterranean Sea
- Area affected: Balearic Islands, Belgium, France, Italy, Netherlands, United Kingdom, Tunisia, Morocco, Algeria, Austria, Switzerland, Croatia, Slovenia
- Date of impact: 27 October–3 November 2018
- Maximum wind gust: 135.0 mph (217.3 km/h), Rolle Pass, Italy
- Lowest pressure: 977 hPa (28.9 inHg)
- Fatalities: 29
- Power outages: 200,000+
- Damage: ≥ £2.9 billion (≥ €3.3 billion)

Storm Adrian (also known as Storm Vaia) was an intense Mediterranean storm which brought severe conditions to Northern Italy and surrounding regions. it was one of the costliest of the 2018-19 named storms, causing £2.9 billion (≥ €3.3 billion) in damages.

== Event ==
The storm formed over the western Mediterranean Sea on October 28, becoming the sixth named storm of the season and the first named storm of the season for Météo-France. The storm made landfall in Corsica on 29 October with powerful wind gusts in excess of 189 km/h (117 mph), winds the equivalent of a Category 3 hurricane. The storm made landfall along the French Riviera later that day, bringing high winds, heavy rain, thunderstorms and a severe storm surge along the south coast of France, causing coastal erosion in Nice. The storm's weather front brought similar problems to northern Italy and the Adriatic coast. Throughout Italy, 11 fatalities were reported. The storm damaged the Basilica of San Marco and left 75% of Venice underwater. It also caused devastating damage to the Alpine forests south of the Dolomites. Additionally, as Storm Adrian pulled north, Central France experienced a winter storm with snowfall totals in excess of 50 cm (20 in) in higher elevations. The wintry weather cut power to 200,000+ and resulted in traffic chaos.

== Origin of the name ==
In Europe, it is possible to pay to have one's name associated with a meteorological event. Since the 1950s, the Institute of Meteorology at the Free University of Berlin has offered the opportunity to name weather events, assigning female names to specific events (such as areas of high or low pressure) on a random basis.

The event from October 26-30, 2018, was named after Mrs. Vaia Jakobs, a manager of a large multinational mattress company, thanks to an original gift from her brother.

== After the storm ==
Following the devastation caused by Storm Vaia, numerous companies initiated efforts to recover the wood from the fallen trees.

=== VAIA Startup ===
One of the standout companies in this field is the startup VAIA. Founded in 2019, VAIA is dedicated to transforming wood recovered from devastated forests into design products. One of its most renowned products is the "VAIA Cube," a natural amplifier for smartphones made entirely from the wood of trees felled by the storm. The VAIA project not only repurposes damaged natural resources but also raises public awareness about the importance of sustainability. For every "VAIA Cube" sold, the company contributes to the reforestation of affected areas by planting new trees, actively aiding in the environmental recovery of the damaged regions.

=== Art ===
In Trentino, local and international artists have responded to the devastation caused by Storm Vaia. Local and international artists have used the wood from fallen trees to create artworks that not only celebrate the natural beauty of the wood but also serve as monuments to the resilience and regeneration of nature. These sculptures are displayed in various locations across the region, attracting tourists and art enthusiasts, and offering a tangible way to remember the storm's impact and the need to protect the environment.

- Winged Dragon of Vaia: Located in the hamlet of Magré in the municipality of Lavarone, Alpe Cimbra, this was the world's largest wooden dragon, created over months of work, with 3,000 screws and 2,000 wood scraps.
- Griffon of Vaia from Tesino: This wooden artwork was created from spruce scraps uprooted by Storm Vaia in October 2018.
- Haflinger in Strembo: This statue was made by recovering the roots of trees broken by the storm. The choice of larch wood, which is similar in color to the Haflinger horse and is very durable, required the search for about twenty roots over more than a year from various areas of the Giudicarie, from Madonna di Campiglio to Storo.
- Eagle in Mercesina: At 7 meters high, 5 meters long, and weighing 1,600 kg, this is the largest wooden eagle in Europe. Symbolizing strength and freedom, this imposing sculpture spreads its wings towards the horizon, looking towards the areas affected by Storm Vaia.
- Wolf of Lagorai: Located at an altitude of 1,600 meters in the hamlet of Vetriolo, the highest spa center in Europe, this 6-meter-high sculpture is made from about 2,000 wood scraps and is the work of sculptor Marco Martalar.
- Stag in Millegrobbe: The Vaia Stag is a large wooden sculpture with sinuous and light forms, situated at an altitude of 1,400 meters in the Millegrobbe locality on Alpe di Cimbra, 2 km from Luserna. It stands out among the mountains of Trentino with its impressive antlers.
