= Almudena Sevilla =

Professor of Economic and Social Policy

Almudena Sevilla CBE
- Education: Queen Mary University of London; Brown University; University College London
- Scientific career
- Workplaces: London School of Economics
- Thesis: Time allocation, social constraints and demographic change in developed countries (2004)

Maria Almudena Sevilla Sanz is a Spanish born academic who is professor of Economic and Social Policy in the Department of Social Policy at the London School of Economics, the Founding Chair of the Royal Economic Society Women in Economics Network and the LSE Women in Social and Public Policy Research Hub.

== Early life and education ==
Sevilla studied business management and economics at the University of Valladolid. She moved to the Pompeu Fabra University for her graduate studies, where she earned an MSc in 1999. Sevilla was a doctoral researcher at Brown University, where she worked in population economics. Her doctorate explored the role of gender-based social attitudes in demographic outcomes. She was awarded the Marie J. Langlois Prize After earning her doctorate she joined the Congressional Budget Office as a Research Officer.

== Research and career ==
Sevilla moved to the United Kingdom in 2005, where she worked at University College London, the University of Essex and Queen Mary University of London. In 2022, she was made a professor of Economics and Public Policy at the London School of Economics. Sevilla works in gender economics. She serves as President of the Society of the Economics of the Household. Sevilla led PARENTIME, a European Research Council project to understand intergenerational transmission of inequality. Before Sevilla's studies, literature had not properly evaluated parent time or child outcomes.

Sevilla was made Chair of the Royal Economic Society Women in Economics Network in 2018, and Director of Women in Social and Public Policy Hub at London School of Economics.

Sevilla was appointed a Commander of the British Empire in the 2025 New Year Honours.

== Selected publications ==
- Alison Andrew; Sarah Cattan; Monica Costa Dias; Christine Farquharson; Lucy Kraftman; Sonya Krutikova; Angus Phimister; Almudena Sevilla (1 September 2020). "Inequalities in Children's Experiences of Home Learning during the COVID-19 Lockdown in England". Fiscal Studies. 41 (3): 653–683. doi:10.1111/1475-5890.12240. ISSN 0143-5671. PMID 33362314. Wikidata Q104574218.
- Natalia Nollenberger; Nuria Rodriguez-Planas; Almudena Sevilla Sanz (2014). "The Math Gender Gap: The Role of Culture". SSRN. doi:10.2139/ssrn.2481568. ISSN 1556-5068. Wikidata Q115232102.
- Cristina Borra; Maria Iacovou; Almudena Sevilla (1 April 2015). "New evidence on breastfeeding and postpartum depression: the importance of understanding women's intentions". Maternal and Child Health Journal. 19 (4): 897–907. doi:10.1007/s10995-014-1591-z. ISSN 1092-7875. PMC 4353856. PMID 25138629. Wikidata Q35159830.
