= Hurricane Katrina =

Category 5 Atlantic hurricane in 2005

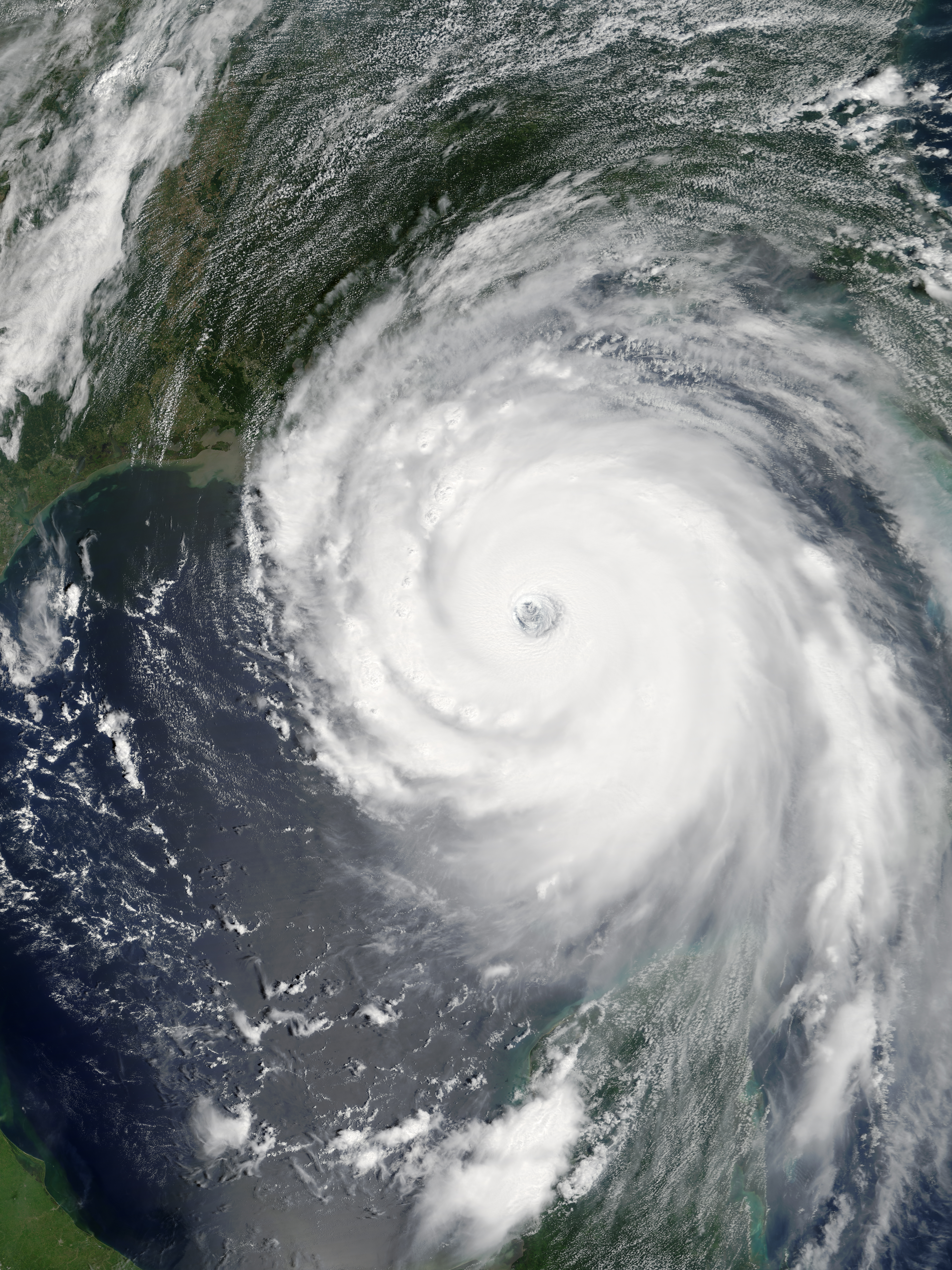
- Katrina at peak intensity in the Gulf of Mexico on August 28

Meteorological history
- Formed: August 23, 2005
- Extratropical: August 30, 2005
- Dissipated: August 31, 2005

Category 5 major hurricane
- 1-minute sustained (SSHWS/NWS)
- Highest winds: 175 mph (280 km/h)
- Lowest pressure: 902 mbar (hPa); 26.64 inHg

Overall effects
- Fatalities: 1,392
- Missing: 652
- Damage: $125 billion (2005 USD) (Costliest tropical cyclone on record when adjusted for inflation)
- Areas affected: Bahamas; Southeastern United States (especially Florida, Louisiana, and Mississippi); Cuba; Northeastern United States; Eastern Canada
- IBTrACS
- Part of the 2005 Atlantic hurricane season

Hurricane Katrina was an extremely powerful and catastrophic tropical cyclone that affected the Southeastern United States in late August 2005, particularly in and around the city of New Orleans. Katrina became the costliest tropical cyclone in the United States, with damage estimated at $125 billion ($206 billion when adjusted for inflation). The hurricane killed 1,392 people, (Note: On January 4, 2023, the NHC updated the Katrina fatality data on the basis of a 2014 report, which reduced the total number from an estimated 1,833 to 1,392.) making it the deadliest American hurricane since the 1928 Okeechobee hurricane and is the only mainland U.S. hurricane to have killed over a thousand people since then. Katrina was the twelfth tropical cyclone, the fifth hurricane, the third major hurricane, and the second Category 5 hurricane of the 2005 Atlantic hurricane season. It was also the fourth-most intense Atlantic hurricane to make landfall in the contiguous United States, as measured by barometric pressure.

The hurricane originated on August 23 near the Bahamas, from the merger of a tropical wave and the remnants of a tropical depression. Katrina strengthened into a hurricane before making its first landfall in southeast Florida on August 25. Crossing the state, the hurricane entered the Gulf of Mexico on August 26 and rapidly intensified. Early on August 28, Katrina peaked as a Category 5 hurricane, with winds of 175 mph (280 km/h) and a minimum central pressure of 902 mbar (26.64 inHg). Turning to the north, the hurricane weakened to a Category 3 hurricane before making landfall on August 29 near Buras-Triumph, Louisiana, with a subsequent final landfall near the Louisiana–Mississippi border. Katrina also produced a widespread tornado outbreak while moving inland and weakening. On August 31, a cold front over Ohio absorbed the circulation of the former hurricane. The remnants of Katrina continued to the northeast, later moving through Canada before losing their identity on September 7 over the eastern Great Lakes.

Eighty percent of New Orleans, as well as large areas in neighboring parishes, were flooded. It is estimated that about 97,000 people remained in the City of New Orleans, despite mandatory evacuation orders. The flooding prompted a massive national and international response effort, including federal, local, and private rescue operations. The largest loss of life was due to flooding caused by engineering flaws in the federally built hurricane protection system, particularly the levees around New Orleans. Investigators concluded that the U.S. Army Corps of Engineers, tasked by Congress in the Flood Control Act of 1965 to design and build the region's hurricane protection, was responsible for the breached floodwalls. Later, a federal appeals court ruled that the Army Corps, despite being responsible, could not be held financially liable due to the Flood Control Act of 1928.

Many major investigations were completed which examined the preparations for and the response to Katrina by the local, state and federal government, leading to the resignation of Federal Emergency Management Agency (FEMA) director Michael D. Brown. President George W. Bush also faced criticism. However, several agencies, such as the United States Coast Guard (USCG), National Hurricane Center (NHC), and National Weather Service (NWS), were commended for their actions. The destruction and loss of life caused by the storm prompted the name Katrina to be retired by the World Meteorological Organization in April 2006.

== Meteorological history ==
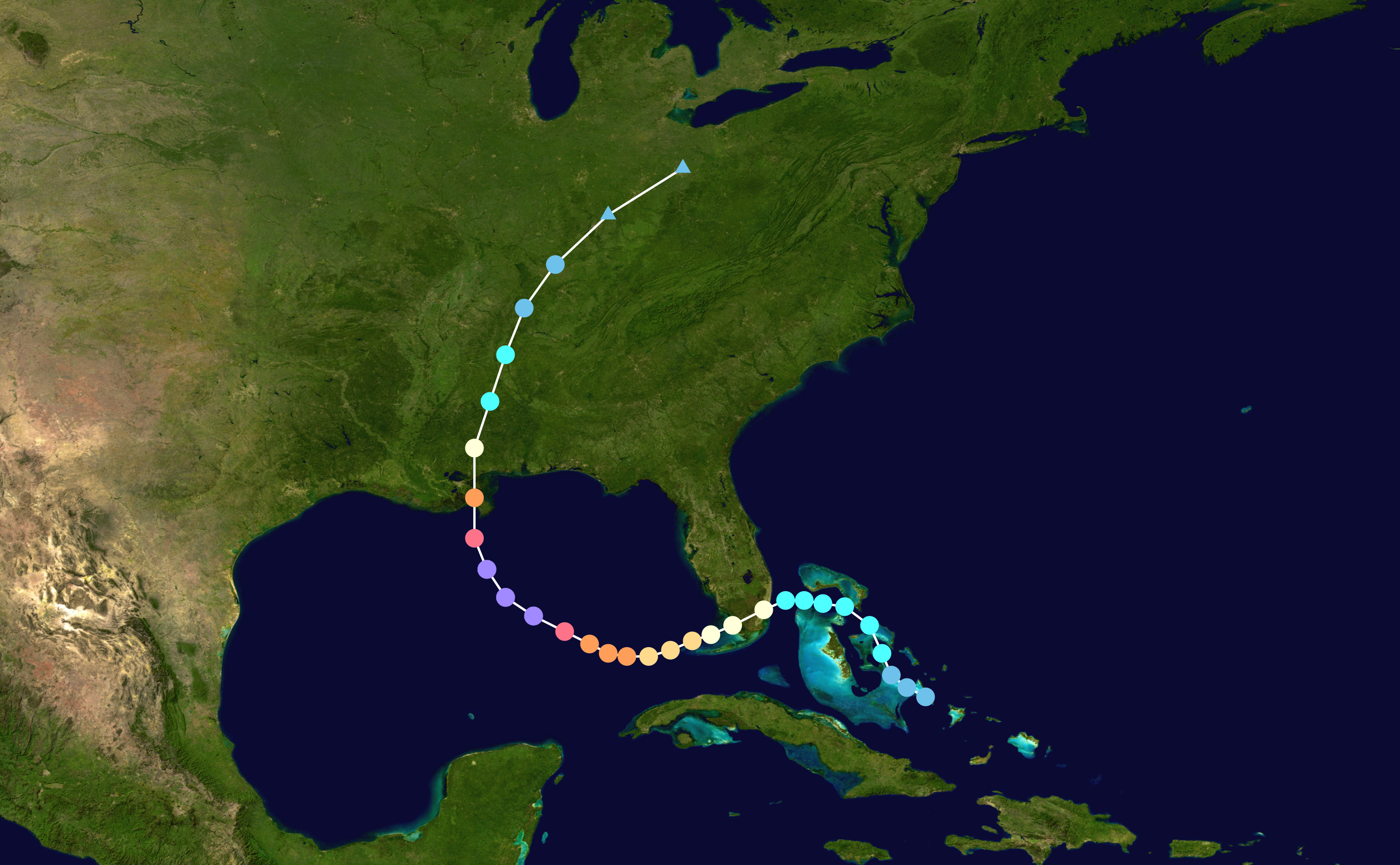
Map plotting the storm's track and intensity, according to the Saffir–Simpson scale Map key Saffir–Simpson scale Tropical depression (≤38 mph, ≤62 km/h) Tropical storm (39–73 mph, 63–118 km/h) Category 1 (74–95 mph, 119–153 km/h) Category 2 (96–110 mph, 154–177 km/h) Category 3 (111–129 mph, 178–208 km/h) Category 4 (130–156 mph, 209–251 km/h) Category 5 (≥157 mph, ≥252 km/h) Unknown Storm type Tropical cyclone Subtropical cyclone Extratropical cyclone, remnant low, tropical disturbance, or monsoon depression

On August 19, 2005, a weak tropical wave combined with the mid-level remnants of Tropical Depression Ten and an upper tropospheric trough near the Lesser Antilles. On August 23, this disturbance organized into Tropical Depression Twelve over the southeastern Bahamas. The storm strengthened into Tropical Storm Katrina on the morning of August 24. The tropical storm moved towards Florida and became a hurricane only two hours before making landfall between Hallandale Beach and Aventura on the morning of August 25. The storm weakened over land, but it regained hurricane status about one hour after entering the Gulf of Mexico, and it continued strengthening over open waters. On August 27, the storm reached Category 3 intensity on the Saffir–Simpson hurricane wind scale, becoming the third major hurricane of the season. An eyewall replacement cycle disrupted the intensification but caused the storm to nearly double in size. Thereafter, Katrina rapidly intensified over the "unusually warm" waters of the Loop Current, from a Category 3 hurricane to a Category 5 hurricane in just nine hours.

After attaining Category 5 hurricane status on the morning of August 28, Katrina reached its peak strength at 1800 UTC, with maximum sustained winds of 175 mph (280 km/h) and a minimum central pressure of 902 mbar (26.64 inHg). The pressure measurement made Katrina the fifth most intense Atlantic hurricane on record at the time, only to be surpassed by Hurricanes Rita and Wilma later in the season; it was also the strongest hurricane ever recorded in the Gulf of Mexico at the time, before Rita broke the record. The hurricane subsequently weakened due to another eyewall replacement cycle, and Katrina made its second landfall at 1110 UTC on August 29, as a high-end Category 3 hurricane with sustained winds of 125 mph (201 km/h), near Buras-Triumph, Louisiana. At landfall, hurricane-force winds extended outward 120 miles (190 km) from the center and the storm's central pressure was 920 mbar (27 inHg). After moving over southeastern Louisiana and then Breton Sound, it made its third and final landfall near the Louisiana–Mississippi border, with Category 3 sustained winds of 120 mph (195 km/h). Katrina maintained hurricane strength well into Mississippi, finally weakening to tropical storm strength more than 150 miles (240 km) inland near Meridian, Mississippi. It was downgraded to a tropical depression near Clarksville, Tennessee; its remnants were absorbed by a cold front in the eastern Great Lakes region on August 31. The resulting extratropical storm moved rapidly to the northeast and affected eastern Canada and was absorbed within a frontal zone over the eastern Great Lakes.

== Preparations ==
=== Federal government ===
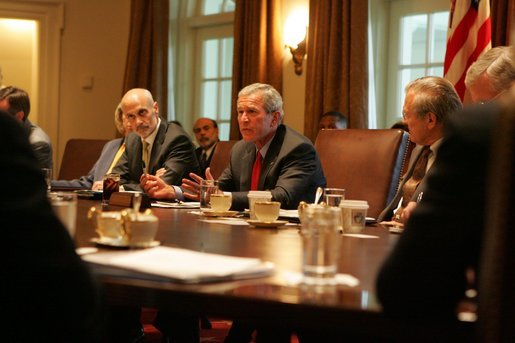
Flanked by Michael Chertoff, Secretary of Homeland Security, left, and Secretary of Defense Donald Rumsfeld, President Bush meets with members of the Task Force on Hurricane Katrina Recovery on August 31, 2005.

The United States Coast Guard began pre-positioning resources in a ring around the expected impact zone and activated more than 400 reservists. On August 27, it moved its personnel out of the New Orleans region prior to the mandatory evacuation. Aircrews from the Aviation Training Center, in Mobile, staged rescue aircraft from Texas to Florida. All aircraft were returning towards the Gulf of Mexico by the afternoon of August 29.

President George W. Bush declared a state of emergency in selected regions of Louisiana, Alabama, and Mississippi on August 27. On Sunday August 28, Governor Kathleen Blanco requested that the President declare an "expedited major disaster for the State of Louisiana" including all the southeastern parishes including the City of New Orleans. On Sunday, August 28, President Bush spoke with Governor Blanco to encourage her to order a mandatory evacuation of New Orleans."

The Associated Press reported that federal officials warned President Bush before landfall that Katrina could 'breach levees', however the AP subsequently corrected that characterization, namely that the pre-landfall federal briefing warned about 'overtopping' not structural breach/failure. The first suggestion that levees could fail structurally occurred at 1:47 a.m. August 29 in a memo from the Homeland Security Operations Center to the White House Situation Room, nine hours after the evacuation was already completed.

Data provided by FEMA indicate that over 1.2 million people along the northern Gulf coast from southeastern Louisiana to Alabama were under some type of evacuation order.

==== National Hurricane Center (NHC) ====
The NHC issued 31 bulletins between August 23 and August 30. Late on the afternoon of Friday August 26, the Center's prediction models shifted in unison away from the Florida panhandle, and New Orleans was moved to the center of the cone of certainty. Jonathan Erdman, senior meteorologist at Weather.com called this “one of the two most memorable forecast shifts I've seen in my 28-plus year career in meteorology, along with Sandy.” At 10:00 a.m. CDTon Sunday August 28––less than 24 hours before landfall––the NHC issued a bulletin predicting maximum sustained winds of 175 mph (280 km/h) and urging that "preparations to protect life and property should be rushed to completion. At 10:11 a.m CDT, Robert Ricks in the Slidell office of the NWS re-issued the bulletin predicting that "high rise office and apartment buildings will sway dangerously... a few to the point of total collapse. All windows will blow out." In a noon teleconference on Sunday August 28, NHC Director Max Mayfield said, "on the forecast track, if it maintains intensity, about twelve feet of storm surge in the lake, the big question is will that top some of the levees? ... I don't think any model can tell you with any confidence right now whether the levees will be topped or not, but that's obviously a very, very grave concern."

=== State government ===
==== Florida ====
In Florida, Governor Jeb Bush declared a state of emergency on August 24 in advance of Hurricane Katrina's landfall. By the following day, Florida's Emergency Operations Center was activated in Tallahassee to monitor the progress of the hurricane. Before Katrina moved ashore, schools and businesses were closed in the Miami area. Cruise ships altered their paths due to seaports in southeastern Florida closing. Officials in Miami-Dade County advised residents in mobile homes or with special needs to evacuate. To the north in Broward County, residents east of the Intracoastal Waterway or in mobile homes were advised to leave their homes. Evacuation orders were issued for offshore islands in Palm Beach County, and for residents in mobile homes south of Lantana Road. Additionally, a mandatory evacuation was ordered for vulnerable housing in Martin County. Shelters were opened across the region. Officials closed the Miami International Airport, Fort Lauderdale–Hollywood International Airport, Key West International Airport, and Florida Keys Marathon Airport due to the storm. In Monroe and Collier counties, schools were closed, and a shelter was opened in Immokalee.

==== Alabama ====
On August 28, Alabama Governor Bob Riley declared a state of emergency for the approaching Hurricane Katrina. On the same day, he requested President Bush to declare "expedited major disaster declaration" for six counties of South Alabama, which was quickly approved. Three hundred fifty national guardsmen were called on duty by August 30. The state of Mississippi activated its National Guard on August 26 in preparation for the storm's landfall. Additionally, the state government activated its Emergency Operations Center the next day, and local governments began issuing evacuation orders. By 6:00 p.m. CDT on August 28, 11 counties and cities issued evacuation orders, a number which increased to 41 counties and 61 cities by the following morning. Moreover, 57 emergency shelters were established on coastal communities, with 31 additional shelters available to open if needed.

By Sunday, August 28, most infrastructure along the Gulf Coast had been shut down, including all freight and Amtrak rail traffic into the evacuation areas as well as the Waterford Nuclear Generating Station. Since Hurricane Katrina, Amtrak's Sunset Limited service has never been restored past New Orleans. (Note: Almost exactly 20 years later, the Mardi Gras Service would restore service served by the Sunset Limited between New Orleans and Mobile.)

==== Louisiana ====
By August 26, many of the computer models had shifted the potential path of Katrina 150 miles (240 km) westward from the Florida Panhandle, putting southeast Louisiana and Mississippi near the center of their track probabilities; the chances of a direct hit were forecast at 17%, with strike probability rising to 29% by August 28. Emergency management officials in New Orleans feared that the storm surge could go over the tops of levees protecting the city.

Louisiana's hurricane evacuation plan used contraflow: turning all lanes of Interstate-10 into one-way lanes outbound from the city. The concept is simple, but it requires perfect coordination local parish governments and the state police in three phases, starting with the immediate coast 50 hours before the start of tropical-storm-force winds. Persons in areas designated Phase II begin evacuating 40 hours before the onset of tropical storm winds and those in Phase III areas (including New Orleans) evacuate 30 hours before the start of such winds. Governor Blanco initiated contraflow at 4 p.m on Saturday, August 27 and ended it at 5 p.m. on Sunday, August 28. The contraflow plan successfully evacuated about one million people and is considered the most successful rapid evacuation of a major city in American history. Louisiana's Emergency Operations Plan Supplement 1C (Part II, Section II, Paragraph D) calls for use of school and other public buses in evacuations. Although buses that later flooded were available to transport those dependent on public transportation, that option was not employed. Public officials instead directed transit-dependent residents to local emergency shelters, since that strategy had worked successfully during previous hurricanes. Some estimates claimed that 80% of the 1.3 million residents of the greater New Orleans metropolitan area evacuated. The Louisiana National Guard delivered three truckloads of water and seven truckloads of MREs — short for "meals ready to eat."

=== Local government ===
==== New Orleans ====
On Sunday August 28th, at about 9:30 a.m. CDT, Mayor Ray Nagin began a news conference where he ordered the first-ever mandatory evacuation of the city, calling Katrina "a storm that most of us have long feared". The mayor also announced that the Louisiana Superdome would be "refuge of last resort" for citizens who could not leave the city. NOAA's official Katrina Service Assessment (2006) states that approximately 80% of New Orleans residents evacuated before Katrina. Using the city's approximately 485,000 residents, that implies roughly 97,000 remained.

== Impact ==
Deaths by state
Alabama	2
Florida	14
Georgia	2
Kentucky	1
Louisiana	986–1,577*
Mississippi	238
Ohio	2
Total	1,245–1,836
Missing	652
*Includes out-of-state evacuees counted by Louisiana

Katrina brought hurricane conditions to southeastern Louisiana, southern Mississippi and southwestern Alabama. Storm surge flooding of 25 to 28 feet above normal tide level occurred along portions of the Mississippi coast. Almost half the total economic loss is the result of flooding in New Orleans where storm surge triggered multiple breaches in the federal flood protection. Katrina is the most costly tropical cyclone in the history of the United States with total damage estimated at $125 billion (2005 U.S. dollars). Katrina was the deadliest storm to strike the U.S. since the 1928 Okeechobee hurricane with a death toll that far outweighs any other storm during the modern era of weather forecasting.

Federal disaster declarations covered 90,000 square miles (230,000 km^{2}) of the United States, an area almost as large as the United Kingdom. The hurricane left an estimated three million people without electricity. On September 3, 2005, Homeland Security Secretary Michael Chertoff described the aftermath of Hurricane Katrina as "probably the worst catastrophe or set of catastrophes" in the country's history, referring to the hurricane itself plus the flooding of New Orleans.

The National Hurricane Center (NHC) originally attributed 1,836 fatalities to the storm: one in Kentucky, two each in Alabama, Georgia, and Ohio, 14 in Florida, 238 in Mississippi, and 1,577 in Louisiana. However, 135 people remain categorized as missing in Louisiana, and many of the deaths are indirect. A 2008 report by the Disaster Medicine and Public Health Preparedness journal indicates that 966 deaths can be directly attributed to the storm in Louisiana, including out of state evacuees, and another 20 indirectly (such as firearm-related deaths and gas poisoning). Due to uncertain causes of death with 454 evacuees, an upper-bound of 1,440 is noted in the paper. A follow-up study by the Louisiana Department of Health & Hospitals determined that the storm was directly responsible for 1,170 fatalities in Louisiana.

On January 4, 2023, the NHC updated the Katrina fatality data on the basis of the published studies of Rappaport (2014) and Rappaport and Blanchard (2016) which reduced the total number from an estimated 1,833 to 1,392.

=== Bahamas and Cuba ===
Before striking South Florida, Katrina traversed the Bahamas as a tropical storm. However, minimal impact was reported, with only "fresh breezes" on various islands.

Although Hurricane Katrina stayed well to the north of Cuba, on August 28 it brought tropical-storm-force winds and rainfall of over 8 in (200 mm) to western regions of the island. Telephone and power lines were damaged and around 8,000 people were evacuated in the Pinar del Río Province. According to Cuban television, the coastal town of Surgidero de Batabanó was 90% underwater.

=== United States ===
Hurricane Katrina was one of the largest-diameter US Gulf Coast hurricanes. Though large size does not imply strength—which is based on sustained wind measurements—it can mean that more people are exposed to its hazards.

==== Florida ====
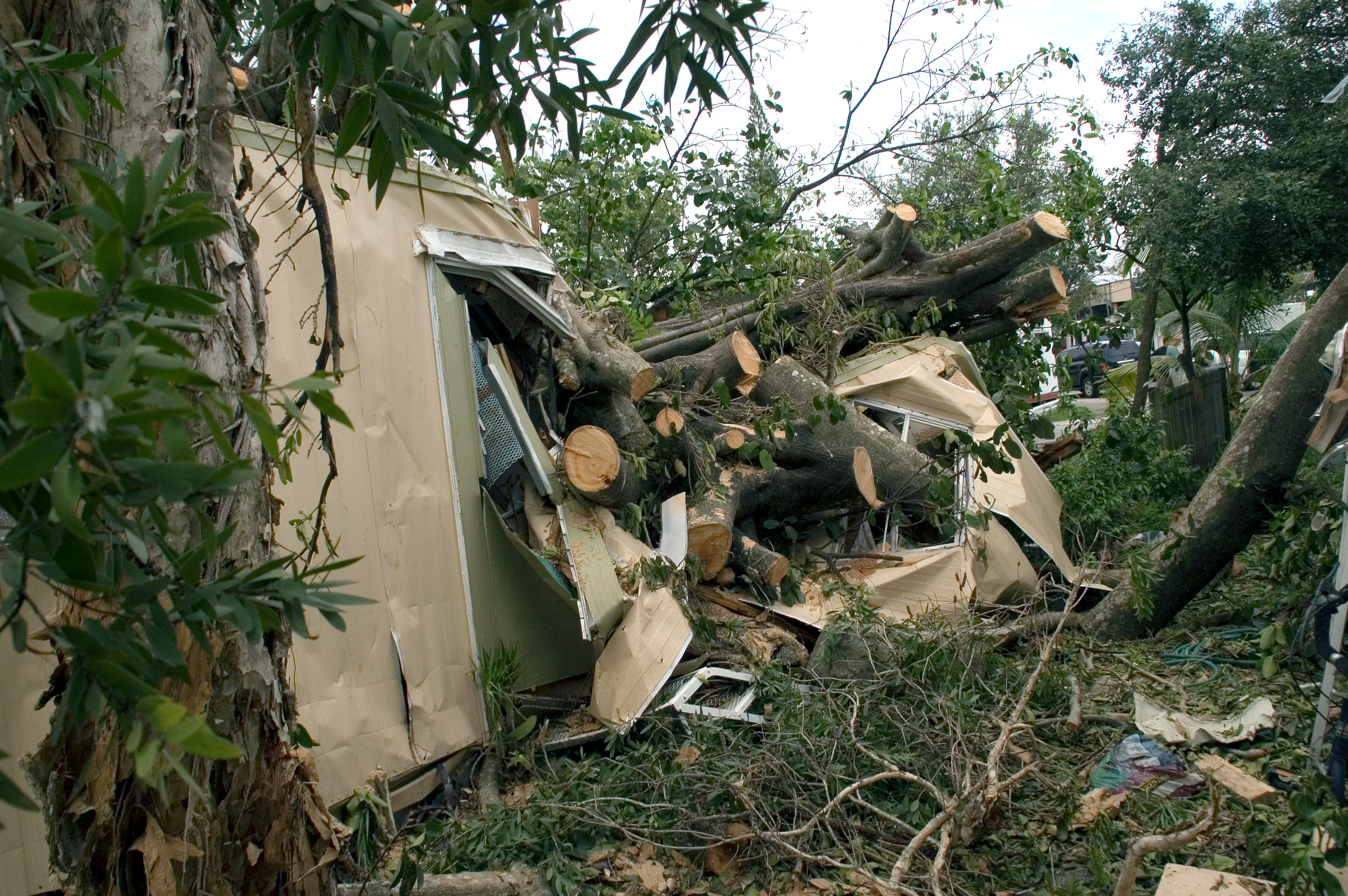
Damage to a mobile home in Davie, Florida following Hurricane Katrina

Hurricane Katrina first made landfall between Hallandale Beach and Aventura, Florida on August 25. The storm dropped heavy rainfall in portions of the Miami metropolitan area, with a peak total of 16.43 in (417 mm) in Perrine. As a result, local flooding occurred in Miami-Dade County, damaging approximately 100 homes. Farther south in the Florida Keys, a tornado was spawned in Marathon on August 26. The tornado damaged a hangar at the airport there and caused an estimated $5 million in damage. The rains caused flooding, and the combination of rains and winds downed trees and power lines, leaving 1.45 million people without power. Damage in South Florida was estimated at $523 million, mostly as a result of crop damage. Twelve deaths occurred in South Florida, of which three were caused by downed trees in Broward County, three from drowning in Miami-Dade County, three were from carbon monoxide poisoning caused by generators, one was due to a vehicle accident, one occurred during debris cleanup, and one was associated with a lack of electricity.

Significant impacts were also reported in the Florida Panhandle. Although Katrina moved ashore in Louisiana and Mississippi, its outer periphery produced a 5.37 ft (1.64 m) storm surge in Pensacola. High waves caused beach erosion and closed nearby roadways. There were five tornadoes in the northwestern portion of the state, though none of them caused significant damage. Throughout the Florida Panhandle, the storm resulted in an estimated $100 million in damage. In the Florida Panhandle, 77,000 customers lost power. Overall, the hurricane killed 14 people and caused at least $623 million in damage.

==== Louisiana ====
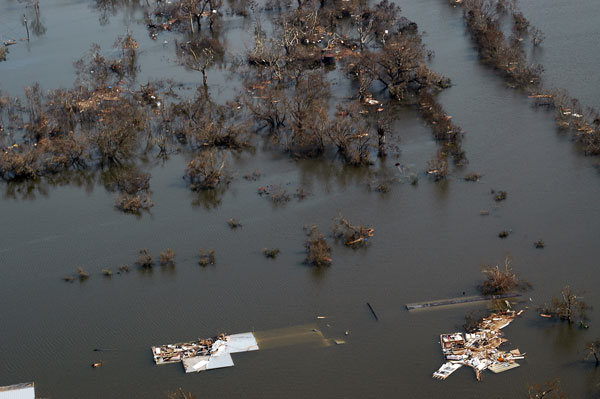
Flooding in Venice, Louisiana

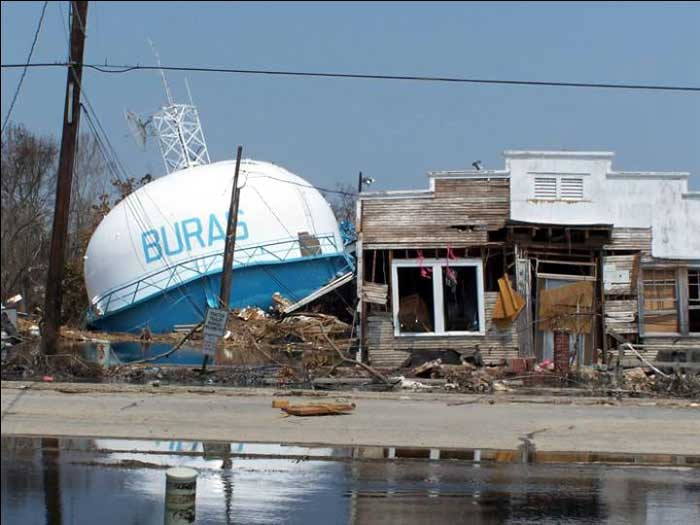
A fallen water tower in Buras-Triumph, Louisiana, where Katrina made landfall

On August 29, 2005, Hurricane Katrina made landfall near Buras-Triumph, Louisiana, with 125 mph (200 km/h) winds, as a strong Category 3 hurricane. Although the storm surge to the east of the path of the eye in Mississippi was higher, a significant surge affected the Louisiana coast. The height of the surge is uncertain because of a lack of data, although a tide gauge in Plaquemines Parish indicated a storm tide in excess of 14 feet (4.3 m), and a 12-foot (3.7 m) storm surge was recorded in Grand Isle. The hurricane made its final landfall near the mouth of the Pearl River on the morning of August 29 at about 9:45 am. CDT.

Hurricane Katrina also brought heavy rain to Louisiana, with 8–10 inches (200–250 mm) falling on a wide swath of the eastern part of the state. In the area around Slidell, the rainfall was even higher, and the highest rainfall recorded in the state was approximately 15 inches (380 mm). As a result of the rainfall and storm surge the level of Lake Pontchartrain rose and caused significant flooding along its northeastern shore, affecting communities from Slidell to Mandeville. Several bridges were destroyed, including the I-10 Twin Span Bridge connecting Slidell to New Orleans. Almost 900,000 people in Louisiana lost power as a result of Hurricane Katrina.

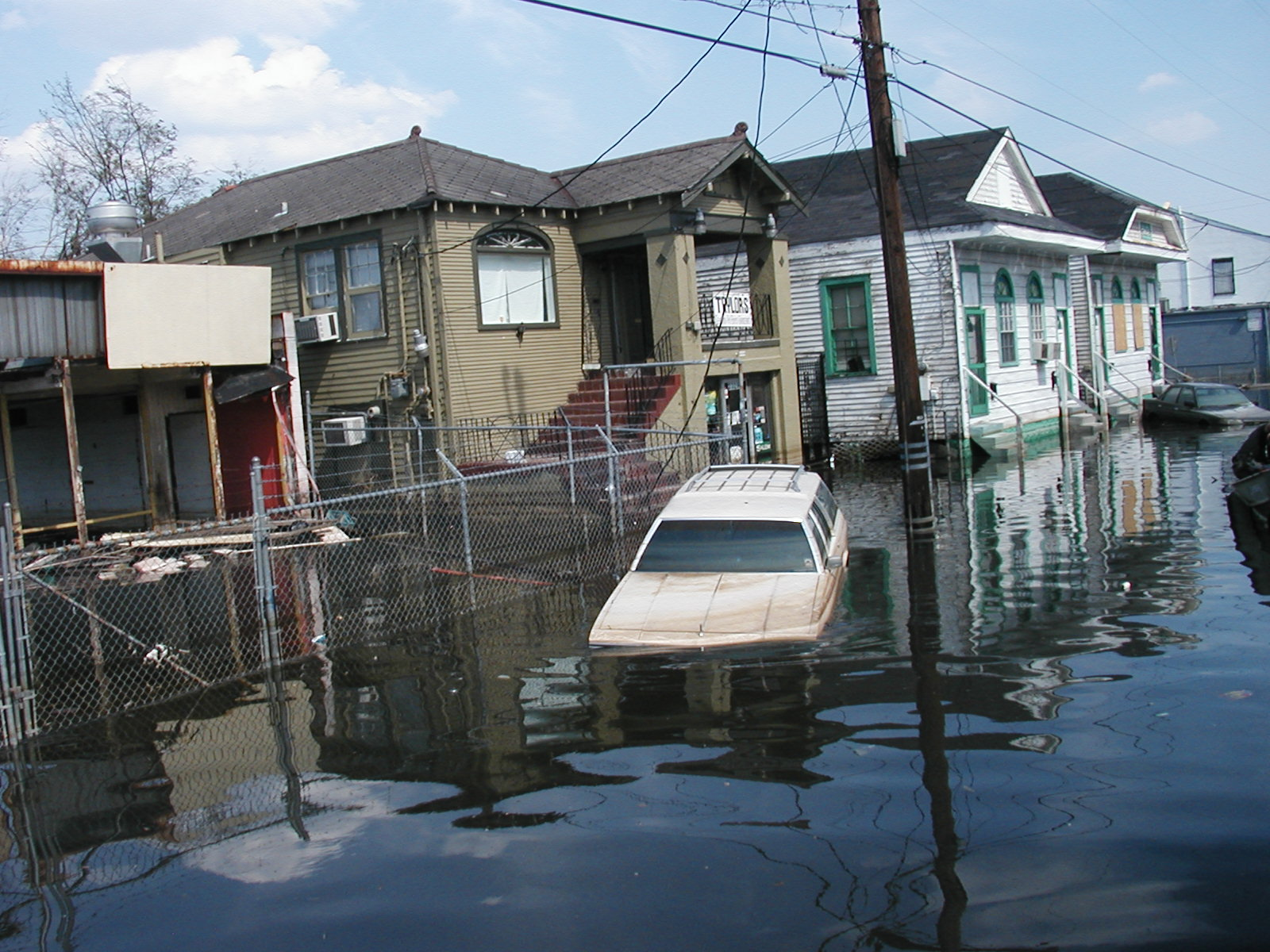
New Orleans

Katrina's storm surge inundated all parishes surrounding Lake Pontchartrain, including St. Tammany, Tangipahoa, St. John the Baptist, and St. Charles Parishes. St. Tammany Parish received a two-part storm surge. The first surge came as Lake Pontchartrain rose and the storm blew water from the Gulf of Mexico into the lake. The second came as the eye of Katrina passed, westerly winds pushed water into a bottleneck at the Rigolets Pass, forcing it farther inland. The range of surge levels in eastern St. Tammany Parish is estimated at 13–16 feet (4.0–4.9 m), not including wave action.

Hard-hit St. Bernard Parish was flooded because of breaching of the levees that contained a navigation channel called the Mississippi River Gulf Outlet (MR-GO.) In the months after the storm, many of the missing were tracked down by searching flooded homes, tracking credit card records, and visiting homes of family and relatives. According to the U.S. Dept. of Housing and Urban Development, in St. Bernard Parish, 81% (20,229) of the housing units were damaged. In St. Tammany Parish, 70% (48,792) were damaged and in Plaquemines Parish 80% (7,212) were damaged.

In addition, the combined effect of Hurricanes Katrina and Rita was the destruction of an estimated 562 square kilometres (217 sq mi) of coastal wetlands in Louisiana.

===== New Orleans =====
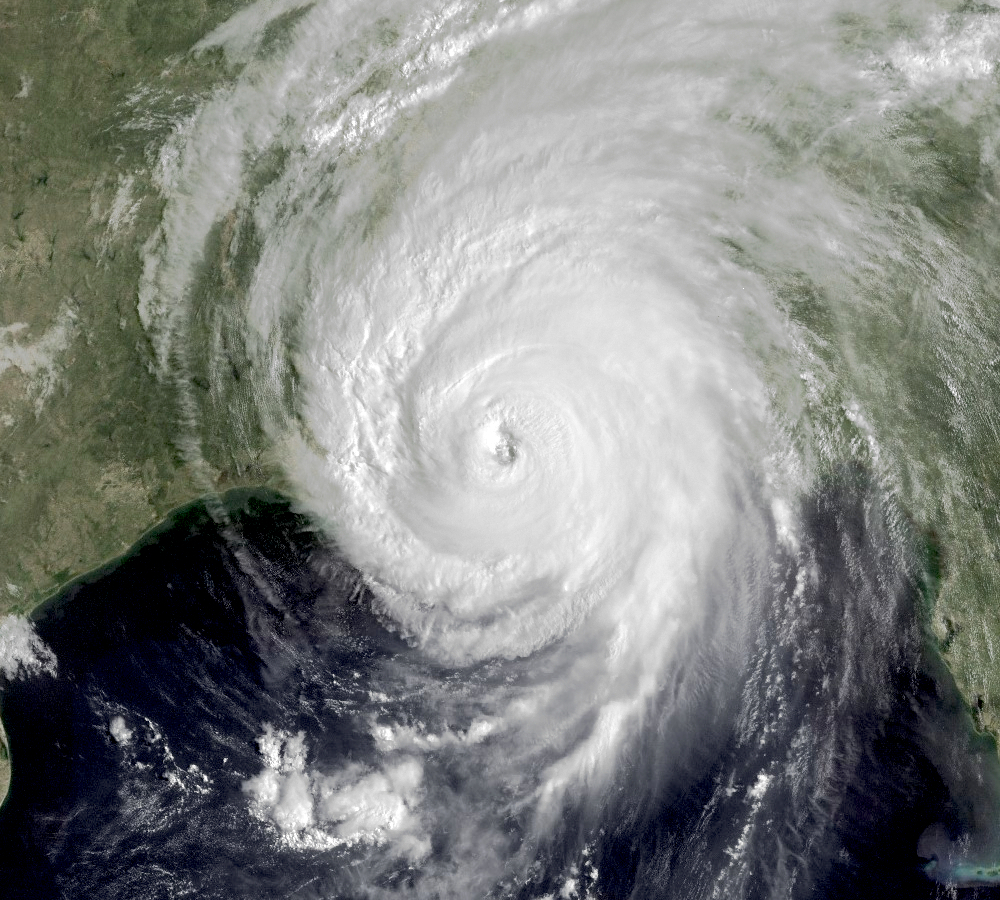
Hurricane Katrina making landfall at the Louisiana-Mississippi border

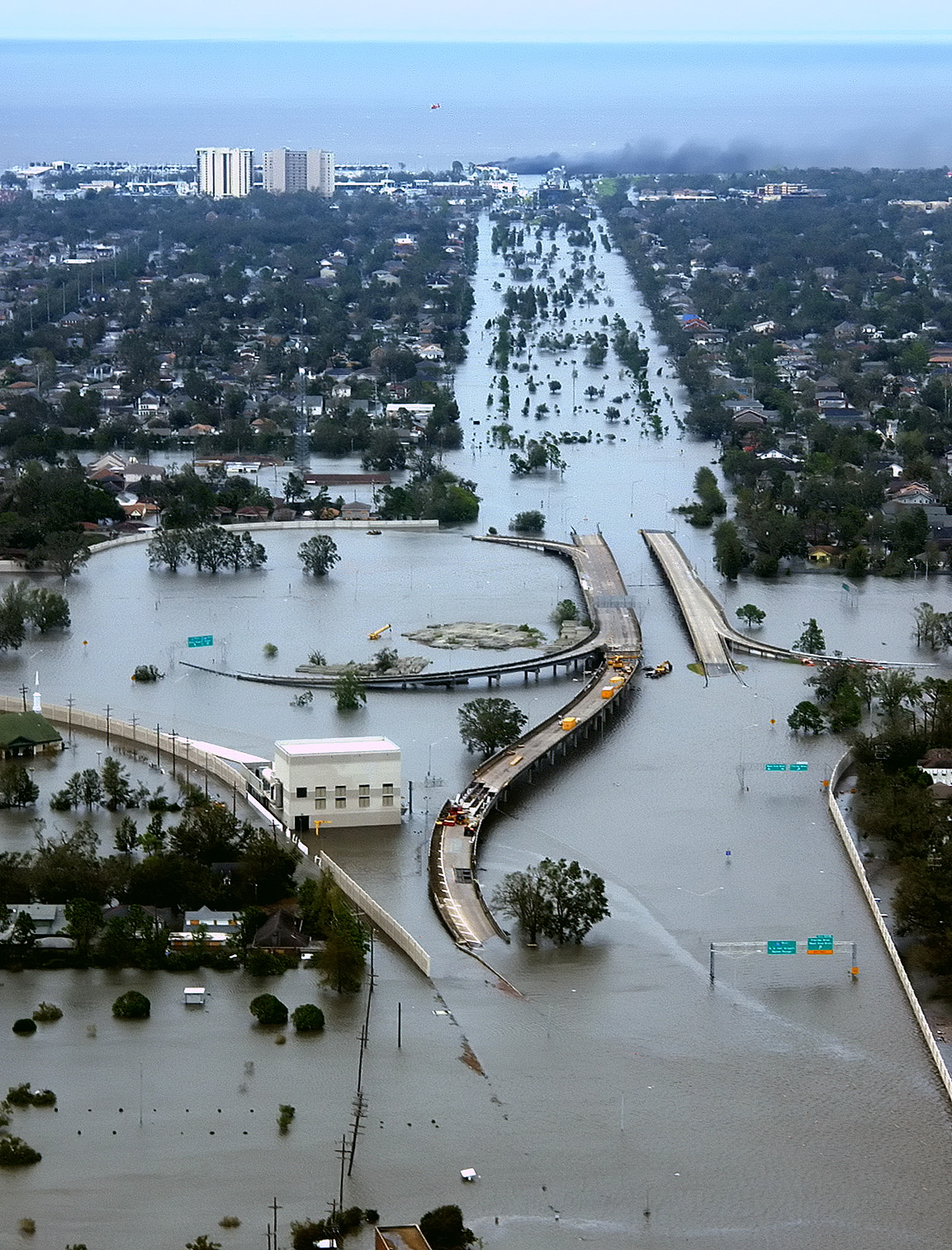
Flooded I-10/I-610/West End Blvd interchange and surrounding area of northwest New Orleans and Metairie, Louisiana

As the eye of Hurricane Katrina swept to the northeast, it subjected the city to hurricane conditions for several hours on August 29. The strongest sustained wind in New Orleans is subject to speculation since observations were sparse, due in part to the power failures that disabled ASOS stations in the area before peak wind conditions occurred. The NHC concluded that much of the city likely experienced sustained surface winds of Category 1 or 2 hurricane strength.

Katrina's storm surge caused more than 50 levee breaches in the federally built levee system protecting metro New Orleans. The major levee breaches in the city included breaches at the 17th Street Canal levee, the London Avenue Canal, and the wide, navigable Industrial Canal, which left approximately 80% of the city flooded. A June 2007 report by the American Society of Civil Engineers indicated that two-thirds of the flooding was caused by the multiple failures of the city's floodwalls.

Most of the major roads traveling into and out of the city were damaged. The only major intact highway routes out of the city were the westbound Crescent City Connection and the Huey P. Long Bridge, as large portions of the I-10 Twin Span Bridge traveling eastbound towards Slidell, Louisiana had collapsed. Both the Lake Pontchartrain Causeway and the Crescent City Connection only carried emergency traffic. According to the New Orleans Police, "although much of New Orleans was flooded, portions of the riverfront corridor remained accessible; police established operations at the Wal-Mart on Tchoupitoulas Street and at a hotel on Convention Center Boulevard in the days following Katrina."

On August 29, at 7:40 a.m., most of the windows on the north side of the Hyatt Regency New Orleans had been blown out, and many other high rise buildings had extensive window damage. At 8:00 a.m, the National Hurricane Center warned, “winds affecting the upper floors of high-rise buildings will be significantly stronger then those near ground level." The next day, the Times-Picayune reported that the Hyatt and other downtown hotels illustrated that the practice of 'vertical evacuation' (i.e. sheltering in high-rise buildings instead of using roadways to evacuate) "is not without its hazards - or discomforts."

Katrina's wind combined with water from the floodwall breaches was damaging the communication infrastructure that local law enforcement, political leaders and emergency managers in Baton Rouge and Washington relied on. Electricity was now out, landlines and telephone switching stations were being submerged. Some cell towers had lost power while others had been knocked over. "One by one, police, city, state, and federal agencies were going blind." More than 1000 base station sites were impacted. Some base stations had their own back-up generators but the long duration of power outages exceeded their capabilities. Eight days after the storm, BellSouth Corp. estimated it could take four to six months to restore service in New Orleans.

The Superdome, which was sheltering many people who had not evacuated, sustained significant damage. Two sections of the Superdome's roof were compromised and the dome's waterproof membrane was essentially peeled off. Louis Armstrong New Orleans International Airport was closed before the storm but did not flood. On August 30, it was reopened to humanitarian and rescue operations. Limited commercial passenger service resumed at the airport on September 13 and regular carrier operations resumed in early October.

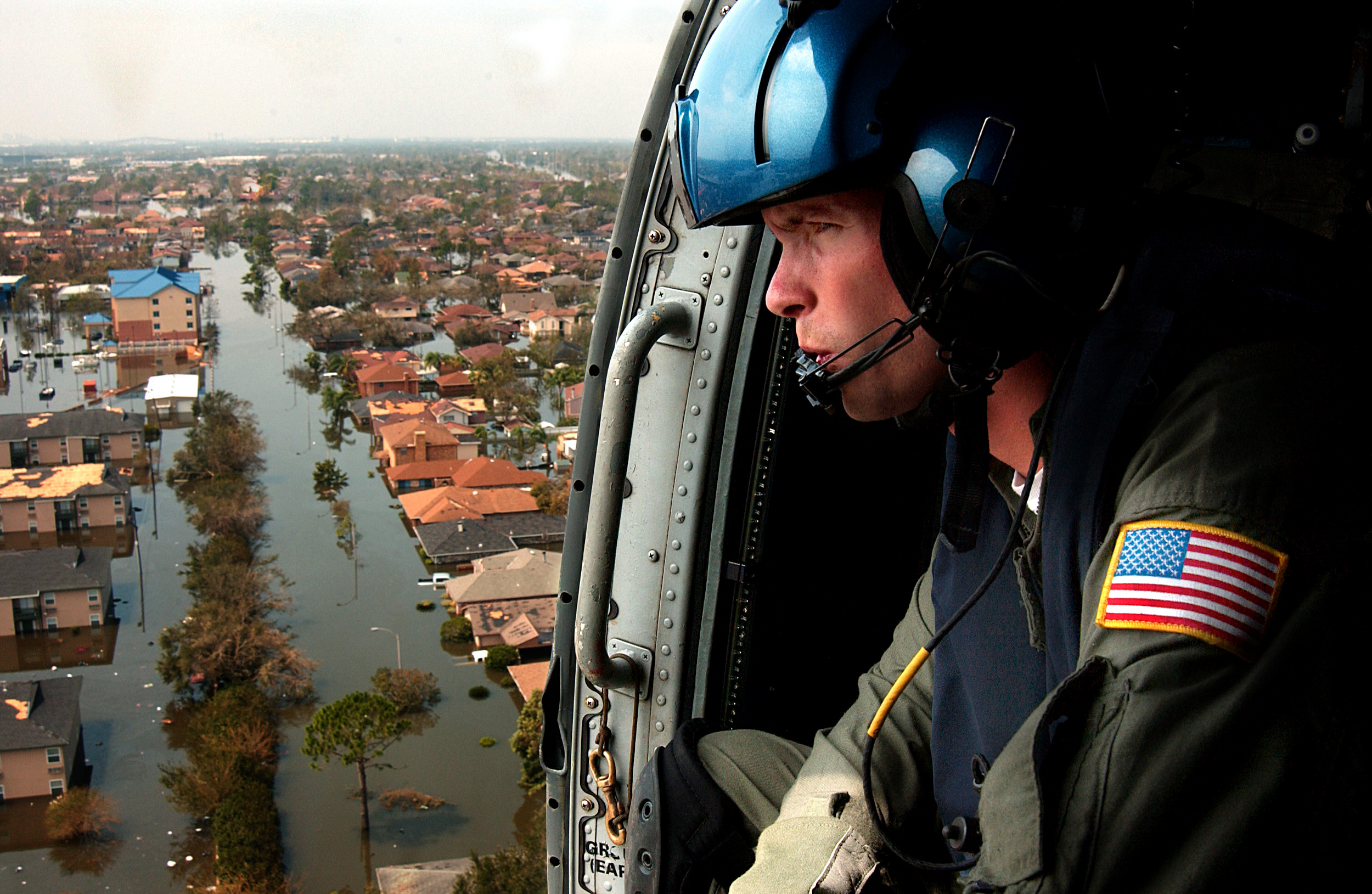
A U.S. coast guardsman searches for survivors in New Orleans in the Katrina aftermath.

Levee breaches and flooding in New Orleans contributed to a significant number of deaths, with over 700 bodies recovered in New Orleans by October 23, 2005. Some survivors and evacuees reported seeing dead bodies lying in city streets and floating in still-flooded sections, especially in the east of the city. The advanced state of decomposition of many corpses, some of which were left in the water or sun for days before being collected, hindered efforts by coroners to identify many of the dead.

An estimated 195 bodies were found in hospitals in New Orleans, with the largest number being at Memorial Medical Center where 45 corpses were recovered. Some 200 patients at Charity Hospital were not evacuated until Friday, September 2, having been without power or fresh water for five days. At the Convention Center, four bodies were recovered. One of the four is believed to be the result of a homicide. An estimated 103 bodies were found in nursing homes.

There is evidence that many prisoners were abandoned in their cells during the storm, while the guards sought shelter. Hundreds of prisoners were later registered as "unaccounted for".

==== Mississippi ====
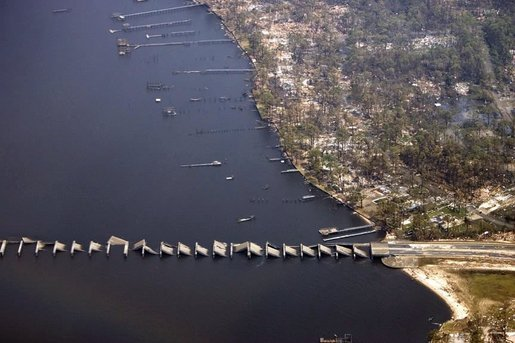
U.S. Route 90's Bay St. Louis Bridge on Pass Christian was destroyed as a result of Katrina.

The Gulf coast of Mississippi suffered extreme damage from the impact of Hurricane Katrina on August 29, leaving 238 people dead, 67 missing, and billions of dollars in damage: bridges, barges, boats, piers, houses, and cars were washed inland. Katrina traveled up the entire state; as a result, all 82 counties in Mississippi were declared disaster areas for federal assistance, 47 for full assistance.

Katrina had made its final landfall near the mouth of the Pearl River at the Louisiana/Mississippi border, still as a Category 3 hurricane with an estimated intensity of 120 mph (190 km/h). Katrina's powerful right-front quadrant passed over the west and central Mississippi coast, causing a powerful 27-foot (8.2 m) storm surge, which penetrated 6 miles (10 km) inland in many areas and up to 12 miles (19 km) inland along bays and rivers; in some areas, the surge crossed Interstate 10 for several miles. Hurricane Katrina brought strong winds to Mississippi, which caused significant tree damage throughout the state. The strongest reported wind gust, although unofficial, was 117 kt (135 mph) in Poplarville, in Pearl River County.

Damage to Long Beach, Mississippi following Hurricane Katrina

A large swath of 8-10 inches of rain fell across southeastern Louisiana and southwestern Mississippi, with a small area of 10-12 inches over eastern Louisiana. Katrina caused eleven tornadoes in Mississippi on August 29, some of which damaged trees and power lines.

Battered by wind, rain and storm surge, some beachfront neighborhoods were completely leveled. Preliminary estimates by Mississippi officials calculated that 90% of the structures within half a mile of the coastline were completely destroyed, and that storm surges traveled as much as 6 miles (10 km) inland in portions of the state's coast. One apartment complex with approximately thirty residents seeking shelter inside collapsed. More than half of the 13 casinos in the state, which were floated on barges to comply with Mississippi land-based gambling laws, were washed hundreds of yards inland by waves.

Major bridges along the northern Gulf coast were destroyed, including several in Mississippi. In the weeks after the storm, with the connectivity of the coastal U.S. Highway 90 shattered, traffic traveling parallel to the coast was reduced first to State Road 11 (parallel to I-10) then to two lanes on the remaining I-10 span when it was opened.

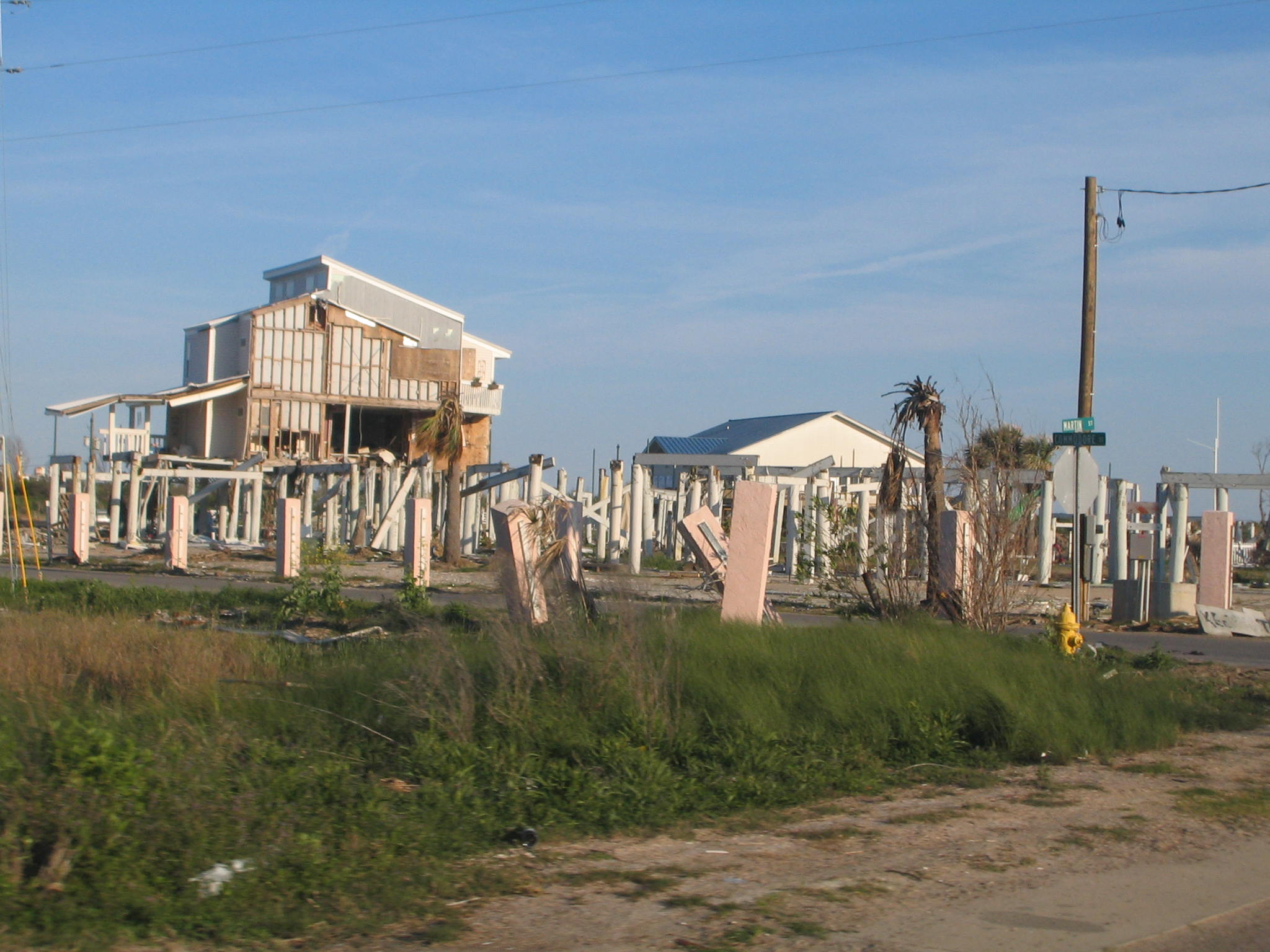
Surge damage in Pascagoula, Mississippi

All three coastal counties of the state were severely affected by the storm. Katrina's surge was the most extensive, as well as the highest, in the documented history of the United States; large portions of Hancock, Harrison, and Jackson counties were inundated by the storm surge, in all three cases affecting most of the populated areas. Surge covered almost the entire lower half of Hancock County, destroying the coastal communities of Clermont Harbor and Waveland, much of Bay St. Louis, and flowed up the Jourdan River, flooding Diamondhead and Kiln. In Harrison County, Pass Christian was completely inundated, along with a narrow strip of land to the east along the coast, which includes the cities of Long Beach and Gulfport; the flooding was more extensive in communities such as D'Iberville, which borders Back Bay. Biloxi, on a peninsula between the Back Bay and the coast, was particularly hard hit, especially the low-lying Point Cadet area. In Jackson County, storm surge flowed up the wide river estuary, with the combined surge and freshwater flooding cutting the county in half. Remarkably, over 90% of Pascagoula, the easternmost coastal city in Mississippi, and about 75 miles (120 km) east of Katrina's landfall near the Louisiana-Mississippi border was flooded from storm surge at the height of the storm. Other large Jackson County neighborhoods such as Porteaux Bay and Gulf Hills were severely damaged with large portions being completely destroyed, and St. Martin was hard hit; Ocean Springs, Moss Point, Gautier and Escatawpa also suffered major surge damage.

Mississippi Emergency Management Agency officials also recorded deaths in Forrest, Hinds, Warren, and Leake counties. Over 900,000 people throughout the state experienced power outages.

==== Alabama ====
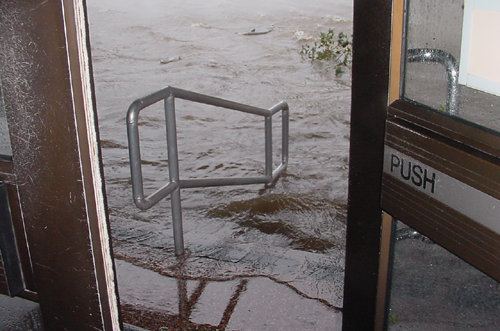
Flood waters come up the steps of Mobile's federal courthouse.

Although Hurricane Katrina made landfall well to the west, Alabama and the Florida Panhandle were both affected by tropical-storm-force winds and a storm surge varying from 12 to 16 feet (3.7–4.9 m) around Mobile Bay, with higher waves on top. Sustained winds of 67 mph (108 km/h) were recorded in Mobile, Alabama, and the storm surge there was approximately 12 feet (3.7 m). The surge caused significant flooding several miles inland along Mobile Bay. Four tornadoes were also reported in Alabama. Ships, oil rigs, boats and fishing piers were washed ashore along Mobile Bay: the cargo ship M/V Caribbean Clipper and many fishing boats were grounded at Bayou La Batre.

An oil rig under construction along the Mobile River broke its moorings and floated 1.5 miles (2.4 km) northwards before striking the Cochrane Bridge just outside Mobile. No significant damage resulted to the bridge and it was soon reopened. The damage on Dauphin Island was severe, with the surge destroying many houses and cutting a new canal through the western portion of the island. An offshore oil rig also became grounded on the island. As in Mississippi, the storm surge caused significant beach erosion along the Alabama coastline. More than 600,000 people lost power in Alabama as a result of Hurricane Katrina and two people died in a traffic accident in the state. Residents in some areas, such as Selma, were without power for several days.

==== Other U.S. states ====
Northern and central Georgia were affected by heavy rains and strong winds from Hurricane Katrina as the storm moved inland, with more than 3 inches (76 mm) of rain falling in several areas. At least 18 tornadoes formed in Georgia on August 29, 2005, the most on record in that state for one day in August. The most serious of these tornadoes was an F2 tornado which affected Heard County and Carroll County. This tornado caused three injuries and one fatality and damaged several houses. The other tornadoes caused significant damage to buildings and agricultural facilities. In addition to the fatality caused by the F2 tornado, there was another fatality in a traffic accident.

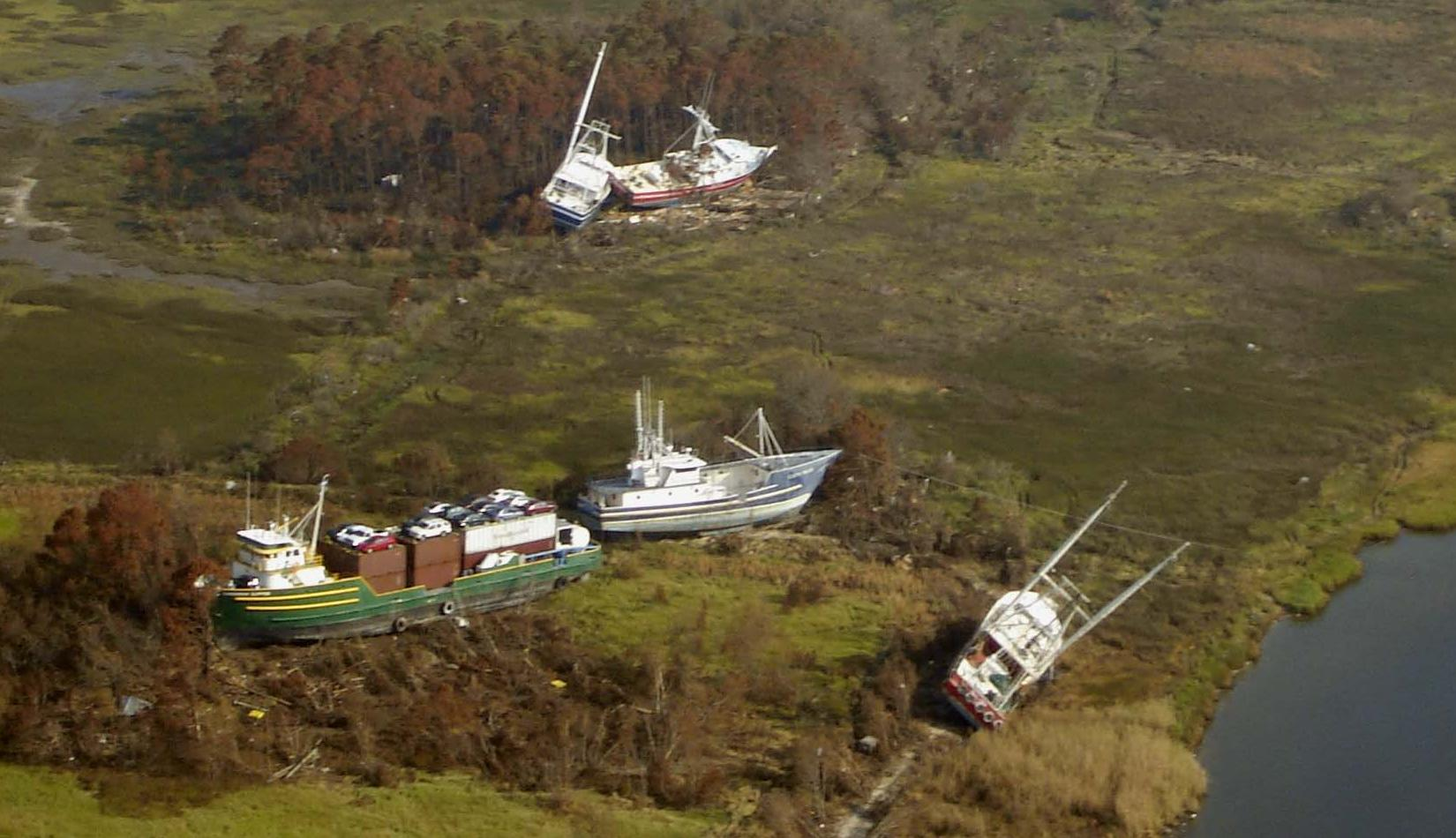
Bayou La Batre: cargo ship and fishing boats were grounded

Eastern Arkansas received light rain from the passage of Katrina. Gusty winds downed some trees and power lines, though damage was minimal. Katrina also caused a number of power outages in many areas, with over 100,000 customers affected in Tennessee, primarily in the Memphis and Nashville areas.

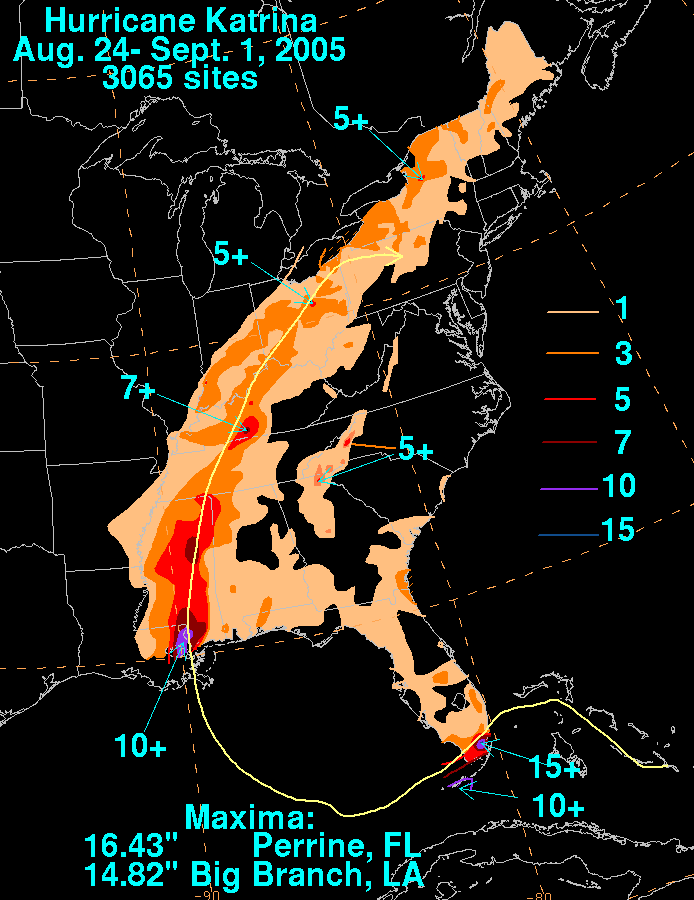
Total rainfall from Katrina in the United States. Data for the New Orleans area is not available.

In Kentucky, rainfall from Katrina compounded flooding from a storm that had moved through during the previous weekend. A 10-year-old girl drowned in Hopkinsville. Dozens of businesses were closed and several families evacuated due to rising floodwaters. As a result of the flooding, Kentucky Governor Ernie Fletcher declared three counties disaster areas and a statewide state of emergency. Additionally, wind gusts up to 72 mph (116 km/h) resulted in some damage. Downed trees and power lines were reported in several counties in western Kentucky, especially Calloway and Christian counties. Overall, more than 10,000 utility customers in western Kentucky experienced power outages. The remnants of Katrina spawned a tornado in Virginia, damaging at least 13 homes in Marshall. In addition, approximately 4,000 people lost electricity. Over 3 in (76 mm) of rain fell in portions of West Virginia, causing localized flooding in several counties. At least 103 homes and 7 buildings suffered some degree of water damage. A number of roads and bridges were inundated or washed out. The remnants of Katrina produced locally heavy precipitation in northeast Ohio, ranging from about 2 to 4 in (51 to 102 mm). Numerous streams and rivers overflowed their banks, forcing the closure of several roads, including Interstate 90 in Cleveland. Two deaths occurred due to a flood-related automobile accident in Huron County. Additionally, hundreds of homes and businesses suffered flood damage.

Katrina spawned five tornadoes in Pennsylvania, though none resulted in significant damage. Up to 5 in (130 mm) of rain fell in western New York. Gusty winds also left approximately 4,500 people in Buffalo without electricity. The remnants of Katrina brought 3 to 6 in (76 to 152 mm) of rain to portions of Massachusetts, causing flash flooding in Bristol and Plymouth counties. Several roads were closed due to floodwater inundation in Acushnet, Dartmouth, New Bedford, and Wareham, including Route 18 in New Bedford. Very minimal impact was reported in Rhode Island, with winds downing a tree and two electrical poles in the city of Warwick. In Vermont, 2.5 in (64 mm) of rain in Chittenden County caused cars to hydroplane on Interstate 89, resulting in many automobile accidents. The storm brought 3 to 5 in (76 to 127 mm) of precipitation to isolated areas of Maine and up to 9 in (230 mm) near Patten. Several roads were inundated or washed out by overflowing brooks and streams, including sections of U.S. Route 1 and Maine routes 11 and 159. Several structures and one parked vehicle were also affected by the waters. Wind gusts up to 60 mph (97 km/h) also impacted parts of Maine, felling trees and causing power outages in Bar Harbor, Blue Hill, Dover-Foxcroft, Sedgwick Ridge, and Sorrento.

=== Canada ===
In Canada, the remnants of Katrina brought rainfall amounts in excess of 3.94 in (100 mm) to many locations between the Niagara Peninsula and the Saint Lawrence River valley. Severe local flooding occurred in Quebec, forcing the evacuations of dozens of homes in some communities as rivers began overflowing their banks and sewage systems were becoming overwhelmed by the influx of precipitation. Inundated and washed out roads, including Route 138 along the north shore of the Saint Lawrence River, Route 172 north of Tadoussac, and Route 385 near Forestville left several communities isolated for at least a week.

== Aftermath ==
As a result of the high death toll and widespread property destruction along the U.S. Gulf Coast, the name Katrina was retired by the World Meteorological Organization in April 2006, and it will never again be used for another tropical cyclone in the Atlantic basin. It was replaced with Katia for the 2011 Atlantic hurricane season.

=== Widespread communications void ===
In the aftermath of Katrina, flooding and widespread power outages crippled most of the New Orleans area's communications infrastructure. Virtually every major means of communication was disrupted by the “hurricane and the extensive flooding from the breached levees” including landline and cellular telephone service, internet access, television and radio broadcasting, and emergency communications systems. Satellite communications were a notable exception. The satellite infrastructure largely remained operational and provided critical alternatives, although access to satellite equipment was limited. According to BellSouth, over 20 million calls attempted on Tues Aug 30 could not be completed. Text messaging sometimes succeeded when voice calls failed, because text messages required much less network capacity and could be stored temporarily for later delivery. However, text messaging was not immune to the destruction of cellular infrastructure.

The equipment failures hampered the ability of first responders to conduct search-and-rescue operations because it prevented emergency personnel from coordinating effectively. For example, hundreds of New Orleans first responders had to communicate over just two radio channels.At least 38 of the affected region’s 911 centers lost their ability to function. In addition to delaying search-and-rescue operations, the communications breakdown also delayed the delivery of relief supplies. Volunteers from the Amateur Radio Emergency Service provided communications in areas where the communications infrastructure had been damaged or totally destroyed, relaying everything from 911 traffic to messages home. In Hancock County, Mississippi, ham radio operators provided the only communications into or out of the area and even served as 911 dispatchers.

=== Economic effects ===
Costliest U.S. Atlantic hurricanes (Note: The storm category color indicates the intensity of the hurricane when landfalling in the U.S.)
Rank	Hurricane	Season	Damage
1	3 Katrina	2005	$125 billion
1	4 Harvey	2017	$125 billion
3	4 Ian	2022	$112 billion
4	4 Maria	2017	$90 billion
5	4 Helene	2024	$78.7 billion
6	4 Ida	2021	$75 billion
7	ET Sandy	2012	$65 billion
8	4 Irma	2017	$52.1 billion
9	3 Milton	2024	$34.3 billion
10	2 Ike	2008	$30 billion

The economic effects of the storm reached high levels. The Bush administration sought $105 billion for repairs and reconstruction in the region, which did not account for damage to the economy caused by potential interruption of the oil supply, destruction of the Gulf Coast's highway infrastructure, and exports of commodities such as grain. Katrina damaged or destroyed 30 oil platforms and caused the closure of nine refineries; the total shut-in oil production from the Gulf of Mexico in the six-month period following Katrina was approximately 24% of the annual production and the shut-in gas production for the same period was about 18%. The forestry industry in Mississippi was also affected, as 1.3 million acres (5,300 km^{2}) of forest lands were destroyed. The total loss to the forestry industry from Katrina was calculated to rise to about $5 billion. Furthermore, hundreds of thousands of local residents were left unemployed. Before the hurricane, the region supported approximately one million non-farm jobs, with 600,000 of them in New Orleans. It was estimated that the total economic impact in Louisiana and Mississippi may eventually exceed $150 billion. Forensic accountants were involved in the assessment of economic damage resulting from this catastrophe.

Katrina displaced over one million people from the central Gulf Coast to elsewhere across the United States, becoming the largest diaspora in the history of the United States. Baton Rouge, Houston, and Atlanta were among the principal destinations for Hurricane Katrina evacuees. Contemporary and subsequent estimates indicate that Baton Rouge initially received approximately 300,000 evacuees, Houston 250,000, and Atlanta 100,000. Chicago, Illinois received over 6,000 people, the most of any non-southern city. By late January 2006, about 200,000 people were once again living in New Orleans, less than half of the pre-storm population. By July 1, 2006, when new population estimates were calculated by the U.S. Census Bureau, the state of Louisiana showed a population decline of 219,563 or 4.87%. Additionally, some insurance companies have stopped insuring homeowners in the area because of the high costs from Hurricanes Katrina and Rita, or have raised homeowners' insurance premiums to cover their risk.

=== Environmental effects ===
Large oil spills caused by Hurricane Katrina Spills exceeding 10,000 US gallons (38,000 L)
Spill Location	Quantity	
Spill Location	(US gal)	(L)
Bass Enterprises (Cox Bay)	3,780,000	14,300,000
Shell (Pilot Town)	1,050,000	4,000,000
Chevron (Empire)	991,000	3,750,000
Murphy Oil (Meraux and Chalmette)	819,000	3,100,000
Bass Enterprises (Pointe à la Hache)	461,000	1,750,000
Chevron (Port Fourchon)	53,000	200,000
Venice Energy Services (Venice)	25,000	95,000
Shell Pipeline Oil (Nairn)	13,440	50,900
Sundown Energy (West Potash)	13,000	49,000

Katrina also had a profound impact on the environment. The storm surge caused substantial beach erosion, in some cases completely devastating coastal areas. In Dauphin Island (a barrier island), approximately 90 mi (140 km) to the east of the point where the hurricane made landfall, the sand that comprised the island was transported across the island into the Mississippi Sound, pushing the island towards land. The storm surge and waves from Katrina also severely damaged the Chandeleur Islands, which had been affected by Hurricane Ivan the previous year. The US Geological Survey has estimated 217 sq mi (560 km^{2}) of land was transformed to water by the hurricanes Katrina and Rita. Before the storm, subsidence and erosion caused loss of land in the Louisiana wetlands and bayous. This, along with the canals built in the area, let Katrina keep more of its intensity when it struck. The lands that were lost were breeding grounds for marine mammals, brown pelicans, turtles, and fish, and migratory species such as redhead ducks. Overall, about 20% of the local marshes were permanently overrun by water as a result of the storm.

The damage from Katrina forced the closure of 16 National Wildlife Refuges. Breton National Wildlife Refuge lost half its area in the storm. As a result, the hurricane affected the habitats of sea turtles, Mississippi sandhill cranes, red-cockaded woodpeckers, and Alabama Beach mice.

Katrina produced massive tree loss along the Gulf Coast, particularly in Louisiana's Pearl River Basin and among bottomland hardwood forests. Before the storm, the standard mortality rate for the area's trees was 1.9%, but this interval increased to 20.5% by the end of 2006. Delayed mortality as an effect of the storm continued with rates up to 5% until 2011. This significant loss in biomass caused greater decay and an increase in carbon emissions. For example, by 2006 the decreased biomass in bottomland hardwood forests contributed an amount of carbon which equated to roughly 140% of the net annual U.S. carbon sink in forest trees.

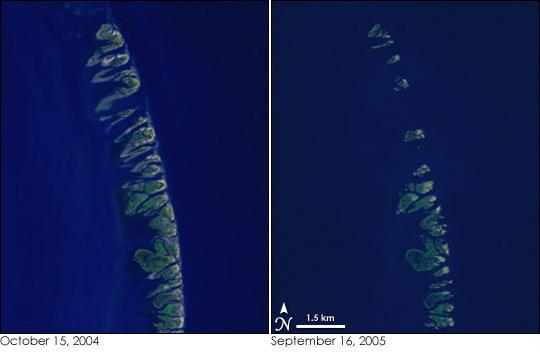
The Chandeleur Islands, before Katrina (left) and after (right), showing the impact of the storm along coastal areas

The storm caused oil spills from 44 facilities throughout southeastern Louisiana, which resulted in over 7 million US gallons (26,000 m^{3}) of oil being leaked. Some spills were only a few hundred gallons and most were contained on-site, though some oil entered the ecosystem and residential areas. After a spill at the Murphy Oil refinery, for example, 1,800 homes were oiled in the towns of Chalmette and Meraux. Unlike Hurricane Ivan, no offshore oil spills were officially reported after Hurricane Katrina. However, Skytruth reported some signs of surface oil in the Gulf of Mexico.

Finally, as part of the cleanup effort, the floodwaters that covered New Orleans were pumped into Lake Pontchartrain, a process that took 43 days to complete. These residual waters contained a mix of raw sewage, bacteria, heavy metals, pesticides, toxic chemicals, and oil, which sparked fears in the scientific community of massive numbers of fish dying. The toxic floodwaters were also a danger for New Orleans, due to the presence of petrochemical chemicals and industrial toxins close to the city. Thomas La Point, director of the Institute of Applied Sciences at the University of North Texas, stated that "[a] toxic soup would be a good way to describe the situation".

=== Reestablishing governance ===
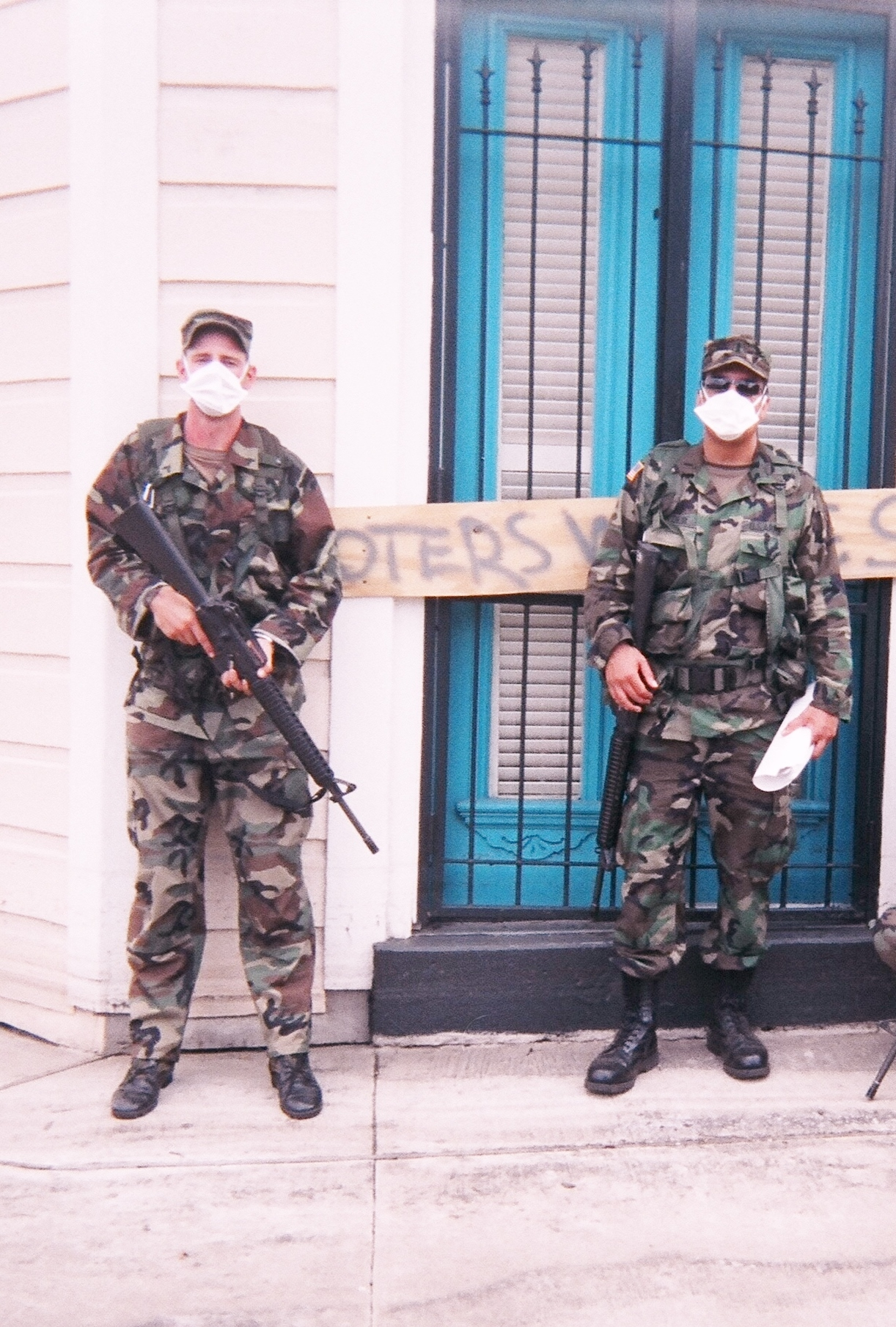
U.S. Army Infantry on patrol in New Orleans in an area previously underwater, September 2005

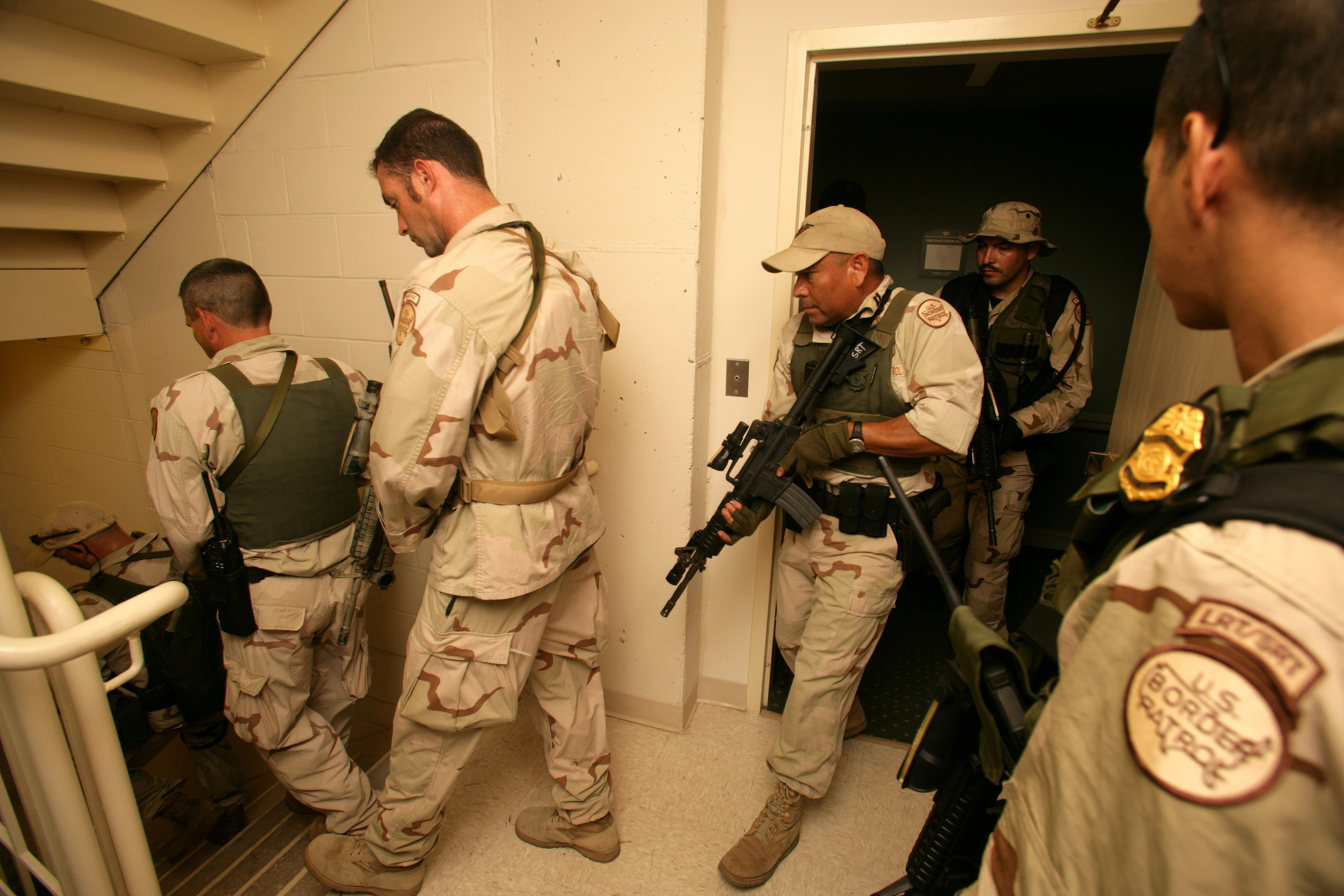
A Border Patrol Special Response Team searches a hotel room-by-room in New Orleans in response to Hurricane Katrina.

On August 30, some residents remaining in New Orleans began taking goods from stores. Many took food, water and other essential supplies, while others took nonessential merchandise such as clothing, jewelry, electronics and appliances. Additionally, there were reports of carjacking, murders, thefts, and rapes in New Orleans. Some sources later determined that many of the reports were inaccurate, greatly exaggerated or completely false, leading news agencies to print retractions. The unverified reporting also earned to a stern rebuke from a February 2006 Select Bipartisan Committee Hearing.

Thousands of National Guard and federal troops were mobilized and sent to Louisiana, with 7,841 in the area on August 29, to a maximum of 46,838 on September 10. A number of local law enforcement agents from across the country were temporarily deputized by the state. "They have M16s and are locked and loaded. These troops know how to shoot and kill and I expect they will," Louisiana Governor Kathleen Blanco said. Congressman Bill Jefferson told ABC News: "There was shooting going on. There was sniping going on. Over the first week of September, law and order were gradually restored to the city." Several shootings occurred between police and New Orleans residents, some involving police misconduct; including an incident where police officers killed two unarmed civilians and seriously injured four others at Danziger Bridge. Five former police officers pleaded guilty to charges connected to the Danziger Bridge shootings in the aftermath of the hurricane. Six other former or existing officers appeared in court in June 2011.

Overall, a number of arrests were made throughout the affected area, including some near the New Orleans Convention Center. A temporary jail was constructed of chain link cages in the New Orleans Union Passenger Terminal, the city's main train station. On September 30, the New Orleans Police Department confirmed that 12 police officers were participating in looting and property theft.

In West Virginia, where roughly 350 refugees were located, local officials took fingerprints to run criminal background checks on the refugees. The background checks found that 45% of the refugees had a criminal record of some nature, and that 22% had a violent criminal record. Media speculation fueled a popular perception that the displaced New Orleans residents brought a wave of crime into the communities where they relocated, however, detailed studies of crime statistics in these communities did not reveal a significant increase in violent crime.

=== Federal government response ===
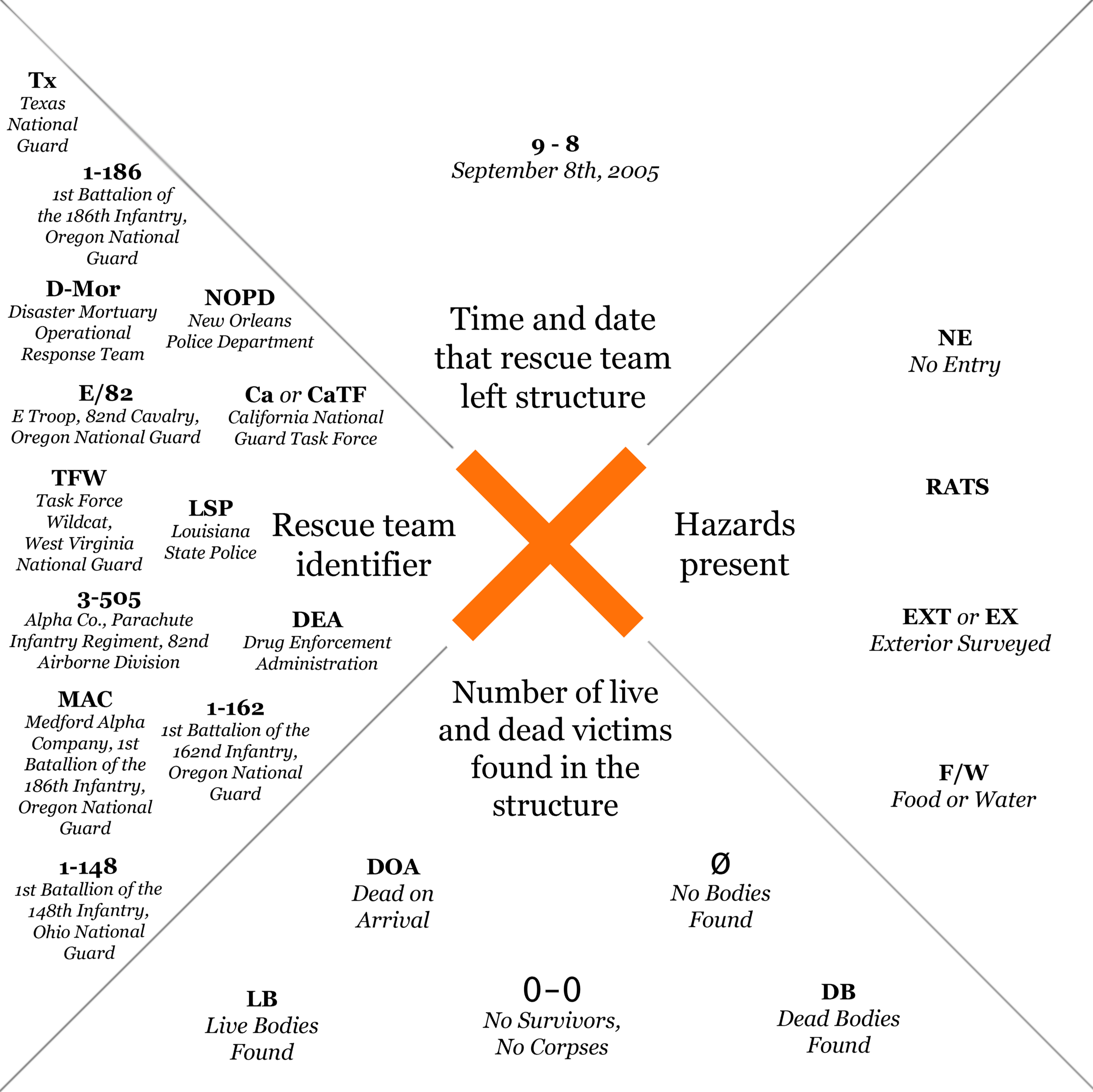
Chart showing some common uses of the FEMA marking system in New Orleans after Hurricane Katrina

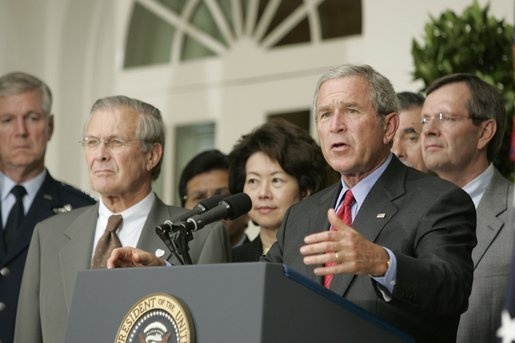
President Bush stands with Donald Rumsfeld, Elaine Chao, and Mike Leavitt during a press conference from the Rose Garden, regarding the devastation along the Gulf Coast caused by Katrina.

In the event of a large-scale emergency like Katrina, the Department of Homeland Security assumes primary responsibility for ensuring that response professionals are prepared. This is intended to prevent the negative consequences of uncoordinated responses by local, state, and federal agencies during emergencies. After Katrina, many of the problems that arose developed from inadequate planning and back-up communication systems at various levels.

Of the 60,000 people stranded in New Orleans, the Coast Guard rescued more than 33,500. Starting the night before the storm, Aircrews began a round-the-clock rescue effort in New Orleans, and along the Mississippi and Alabama coastlines. Congress recognized the Coast Guard's response with an official entry in the Congressional Record, and the Armed Service was awarded the Presidential Unit Citation.

The United States Northern Command established Joint Task Force (JTF) Katrina based out of Camp Shelby, Mississippi, to act as the military's on-scene response on Sunday, August 28, with Lieutenant General Russel L. Honoré as commander. Approximately 58,000 National Guard personnel were activated to deal with the storm's aftermath, with troops coming from all 50 states. The Department of Defense also activated volunteer members of the Civil Air Patrol.

Michael Chertoff, Secretary of the Department of Homeland Security, decided to take over the federal, state, and local operations officially on August 30, 2005, citing the National Response Plan. Early in September, Congress authorized a total of $62.3 billion in aid for victims. Additionally, President George W. Bush enlisted the help of former presidents Bill Clinton and George H. W. Bush to raise additional voluntary contributions, much as they did after the 2004 Indian Ocean earthquake and tsunami. American flags were also ordered to be half-staff from September 2, 2005, to September 20, 2005, in honor of the victims.

FEMA provided housing assistance (rental assistance, trailers, etc.) to more than 700,000 applicants—families and individuals. However, only one-fifth of the trailers requested in Orleans Parish were supplied, resulting in an enormous housing shortage in the city of New Orleans. Many local areas voted to not allow the trailers, and many areas had no utilities, a requirement prior to placing the trailers. To provide for additional housing, FEMA has also paid for the hotel costs of 12,000 individuals and families displaced by Katrina through February 7, 2006, when a final deadline was set for the end of hotel cost coverage. After this deadline, evacuees were still eligible to receive federal assistance, which could be used towards either apartment rent, additional hotel stays, or fixing their ruined homes, although FEMA no longer paid for hotels directly. As of March 30, 2010, there were still 260 families living in FEMA-provided trailers in Louisiana and Mississippi.

Law enforcement and public safety agencies, from across the United States, provided a "mutual aid" response to Louisiana and New Orleans in the weeks following the disaster. Many agencies responded with manpower and equipment from as far away as California, Michigan, Nevada, New York, and Texas. This response was welcomed by local Louisiana authorities as their staff were either becoming fatigued, stretched too thin, or even quitting from the job.

Two weeks after the storm, more than half of the states were involved in providing shelter for evacuees. By four weeks after the storm, evacuees had been registered in all 50 states and in 18,700 zip codes—half of the nation's residential postal zones. Most evacuees had stayed within 250 miles (400 km), but 240,000 households went to Houston and other cities over 250 miles (400 km) away and another 60,000 households went over 750 miles (1,200 km) away.

==== Criticism ====
Within days of Katrina's August 29 landfall, public debate arose about the local, state and federal governments' role in the preparations for and response to the hurricane. Criticism was initially prompted by televised images of visibly shaken and frustrated political leaders, and of residents who remained stranded by floodwaters without water, food, or shelter. Deaths from thirst and exhaustion days after the storm had passed fueled the criticism, as did the dilemma of the evacuees at facilities such as the Louisiana Superdome and the New Orleans Civic Center. Some alleged that race, class, and other factors could have contributed to delays in government response. For example, during A Concert for Hurricane Relief, a benefit concert for victims of the hurricane, rapper Kanye West veered off script and harshly criticized the government's response to the crisis, stating that "George Bush doesn't care about black people." The neologism Katrinagate was coined to refer to the lack of planning, and was one among other Katrina-related terms in a runoff for "2005 word of the year".

Many major investigations were completed which examined the preparations for and the response to Hurricane Katrina by the local, state and federal government. These include but are not limited to: the United States House, the United States Senate, the White House, the Government Accountability Office, FEMA and the DHS Office of the Inspector General.

In accordance with federal law, President George W. Bush directed the Secretary of the Department of Homeland Security, Michael Chertoff, to coordinate the Federal response. Chertoff designated Michael D. Brown, head of the Federal Emergency Management Agency, as the Principal Federal Official to lead the deployment and coordination of all federal response resources and forces in the Gulf Coast region. However, the president and Secretary Chertoff initially came under harsh criticism for what some perceived as a lack of planning and coordination.

The lack of communication infrastructure hindered relief efforts, but was worsened by FEMA personnel. At noon on Tuesday (August 30), a FEMA team, led by Phil Parr, had helicoptered into the Superdome. Parr had expected to work out of Red October—a Mobile Emergency Response Support (MERS)––a high-tech communications center with thirty computer workstations on the back of a tractor trailer. Its satellite phones and internet capability could have provided a makeshift network and allowed first responders to communicate. But Red October was still a six-hour drive away in Shreveport. Former FEMA Director Michael Brown later testified that, in hindsight, FEMA should have pre-positioned a MERS detachment in New Orleans four days earlier.

On September 26, during testimony by former Federal Emergency Management Agency (FEMA) chief Michael Brown before a U.S. House subcommittee, Representative Stephen Buyer (R-IN) inquired as to why President Bush's declaration of state of emergency for Louisiana on August 27 had not specifically included the coastal parishes of Orleans, Jefferson, and Plaquemines while the declarations for Mississippi and for Alabama did include coastal parishes. Michael Brown attributed the omission of Orleans, Jefferson and Plaquemines parishes to Governor Blanco, claiming that she had excluded them from her initial request. However, Blanco's request in writing did in fact, seek assistance for all southeastern Louisiana parishes, including the three coastal parishes and including the City of New Orleans. Eight days later, Michael Chertoff announced that Coast Guard Vice Admiral Thad Allen will replace FEMA director Michael Brown as the on-site head of hurricane relief operations in the Gulf Coast. Three days after the recall, Brown resigned as director of FEMA.

A Bipartisan Government Report determined that evacuations of general populations went relatively well in Louisiana, Mississippi and Alabama. But federal, state, and local officials' failure to anticipate the post-landfall conditions delayed post-landfall evacuation and support. This was due largely to a lack of a warning system for levee breaches which led to deaths, thousands of dangerous rescues, and horrible conditions for those who remained.

While the city of New Orleans had issued a mandatory evacuation, this did not provide for those without transportation. The 2006 Senate Committee on Homeland Security and Governmental Affairs found that New Orleans had expressed an intention to help residents without access to private cars, but lacked a plan to actually carry it out.

The destruction wrought by Hurricane Katrina raised other, more general public policy issues about emergency management, environmental policy, poverty, and unemployment. The discussion of both the immediate response and of the broader public policy issues may have affected elections and legislation enacted at various levels of government. The storm's devastation also prompted a congressional investigation, which found that FEMA and the Red Cross "did not have a logistics capacity sophisticated enough to fully support the massive number of Gulf coast victims". Additionally, it placed responsibility for the disaster on all three levels of government. An ABC News poll conducted on September 2, 2005, showed more blame was being directed at state and local governments (75%) than at the Federal government (67%), with 44% blaming Bush's leadership directly. A later CNN/USAToday/Gallup poll showed that respondents disagreed widely on who was to blame for the problems in the city following the hurricane—13% said Bush, 18% said federal agencies, 25% blamed state or local officials and 38% said no one was to blame.

=== International response ===
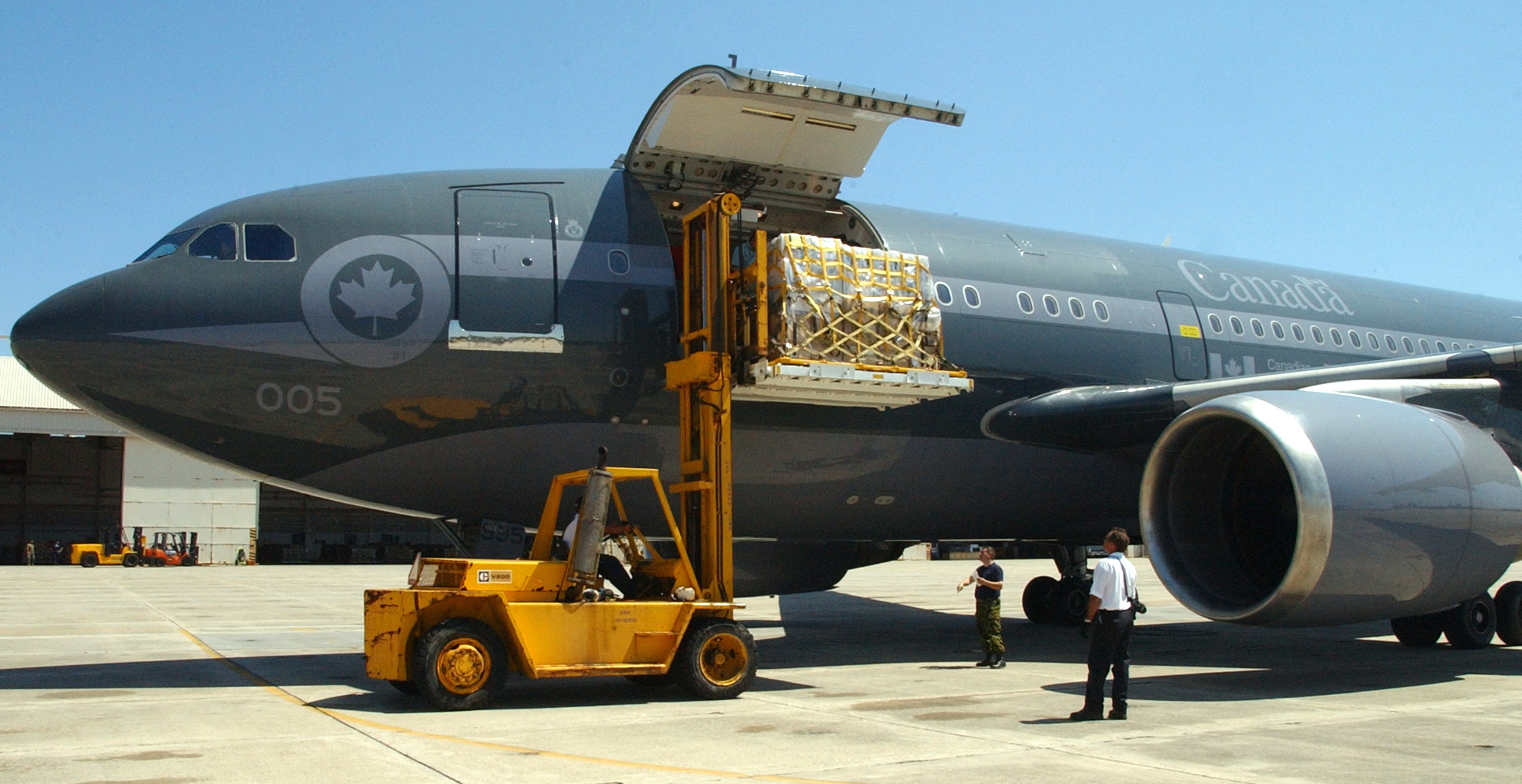
United States Navy personnel unload Canadian relief supplies from a Royal Canadian Air Force transport aircraft in Pensacola, Florida.

Over seventy countries pledged monetary donations or other assistance. Cuba and Venezuela were the first countries to offer assistance, pledging over $1 million, several mobile hospitals, water treatment plants, canned food, bottled water, heating oil, 1,100 doctors and 26.4 metric tons of medicine, though this aid was rejected by the U.S. government. Kuwait made the largest single pledge, $500 million; other large donations were made by Qatar and the United Arab Emirates (each $100 million), South Korea ($30 million), Australia ($10 million), India, China (both $5 million), New Zealand ($2 million), Pakistan ($1.5 million), Norway ($1.8 million), and Bangladesh ($1 million).

India sent tarps, blankets, and hygiene kits. An Indian Air Force IL-76 aircraft delivered 25 tonnes of relief supplies for the Hurricane Katrina victims at the Little Rock Air Force Base, Arkansas, on September 13, 2005.

Israel sent an IDF delegation to New Orleans to transport aid equipment including 80 tons of food, disposable diapers, beds, blankets, generators and additional equipment which were donated from different governmental institutions, civilian institutions, and the IDF. The Bush administration announced in mid-September that it did not need Israeli divers and physicians to come to the United States for search and rescue missions, but a small team landed in New Orleans on September 10 to give assistance to operations already underway. The team administered first aid to survivors, rescued abandoned pets and discovered hurricane victims.

Countries like Sri Lanka, which was still recovering from a tsunami the previous year, also offered to help. Canada, Mexico, Singapore, and Germany sent supplies, relief personnel (like Technisches Hilfswerk), troops, ships and water pumps to aid in the disaster recovery. Belgium sent in a team of relief personnel. The United Kingdom's donation of 350,000 emergency meals did not reach victims because of laws regarding mad cow disease.

Russia's initial offer of two jets was declined by the U.S. State Department but accepted later. The French offer was also declined and requested later.

=== Non-governmental organization (NGO) response ===
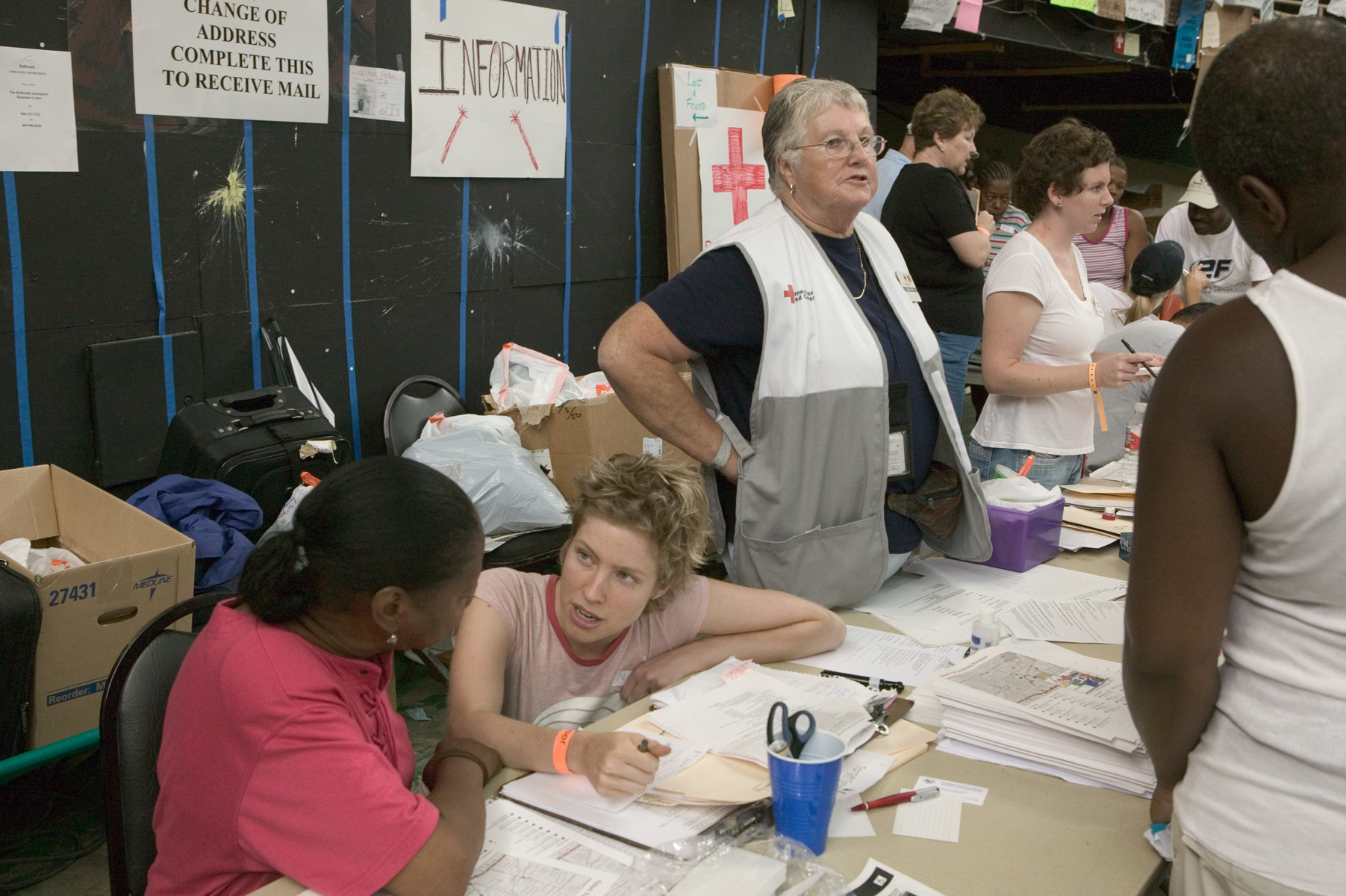
Residents of Louisiana, who had to flee their homes because of Hurricane Katrina, are inside the Houston Astrodome and being helped by the Red Cross and other agencies and associations.

In the immediate aftermath of the hurricane, hundreds of Louisiana residents used privately owned boats to rescue people stranded by floodwaters in New Orleans. The volunteer effort later became known as the Cajun Navy and was subsequently praised for its lifesaving work.

NGOs including the American Red Cross, America's Second Harvest (now known as Feeding America), Southern Baptist Convention, Salvation Army, Oxfam, Common Ground Collective, Burners Without Borders, Emergency Communities, Habitat for Humanity, Catholic Charities, Direct Relief, Service International, "A River of Hope", The Church of Jesus Christ of Latter-day Saints, and many others provided aid to victims, but they were not allowed into New Orleans proper by the National Guard for several days after the storm because of safety concerns. These organizations raised $4.25 billion in donations from the public, with the Red Cross receiving over half of these donations. Some smaller organizations and individuals ignored the access restrictions and provided early relief. For example, two privately chartered planes from FasterCures evacuated 200 patients from Charity Hospital in New Orleans.

Many private corporations also contributed to relief efforts. On September 13, 2005, it was reported that corporate donations amounted to $409 million, and were expected to exceed $1 billion.

During and after the Hurricanes Katrina, Wilma and Rita, the American Red Cross had opened 1,470 shelters and registered 3.8 million overnight stays. None were allowed in New Orleans, however. A total of 244,000 Red Cross workers (95% of which were non-paid volunteers) were used throughout these three hurricanes. In addition, 346,980 comfort kits (including such basic necessities as toothpaste, soap, washcloths, and toys for children) and 205,360 cleanup kits (containing brooms, mops, and bleach) were distributed. For mass care, the organization served 68 million snacks and meals to victims of the disasters and to rescue workers. The Red Cross also had its Disaster Health services meet 596,810 contacts, and Disaster Mental Health services met 826,590 contacts. Red Cross emergency financial assistance was provided to 1.4 million families.

Direct Relief provided a major response in the Gulf states so health providers could treat the local patients and evacuees. Direct Relief furnished $10 million in medical material aid and cash grants to support clinics and health centers in the area.

In the year following Katrina's strike on the Gulf Coast, The Salvation Army allocated donations of more than $365 million to serve more than 1.7 million people in nearly every state. The organization's immediate response to Hurricane Katrina included more than 5.7 million hot meals and about 8.3 million sandwiches, snacks, and drinks served in and around New Orleans. Its SATERN network of amateur radio operators picked up where modern communications left off to help locate more than 25,000 survivors. Salvation Army pastoral care counselors were on hand to comfort the emotional and spiritual needs of 277,000 individuals. As part of the overall effort, Salvation Army officers, employees, and volunteers contributed more than 900,000 hours of service.

=== Analyses of New Orleans levee failures ===
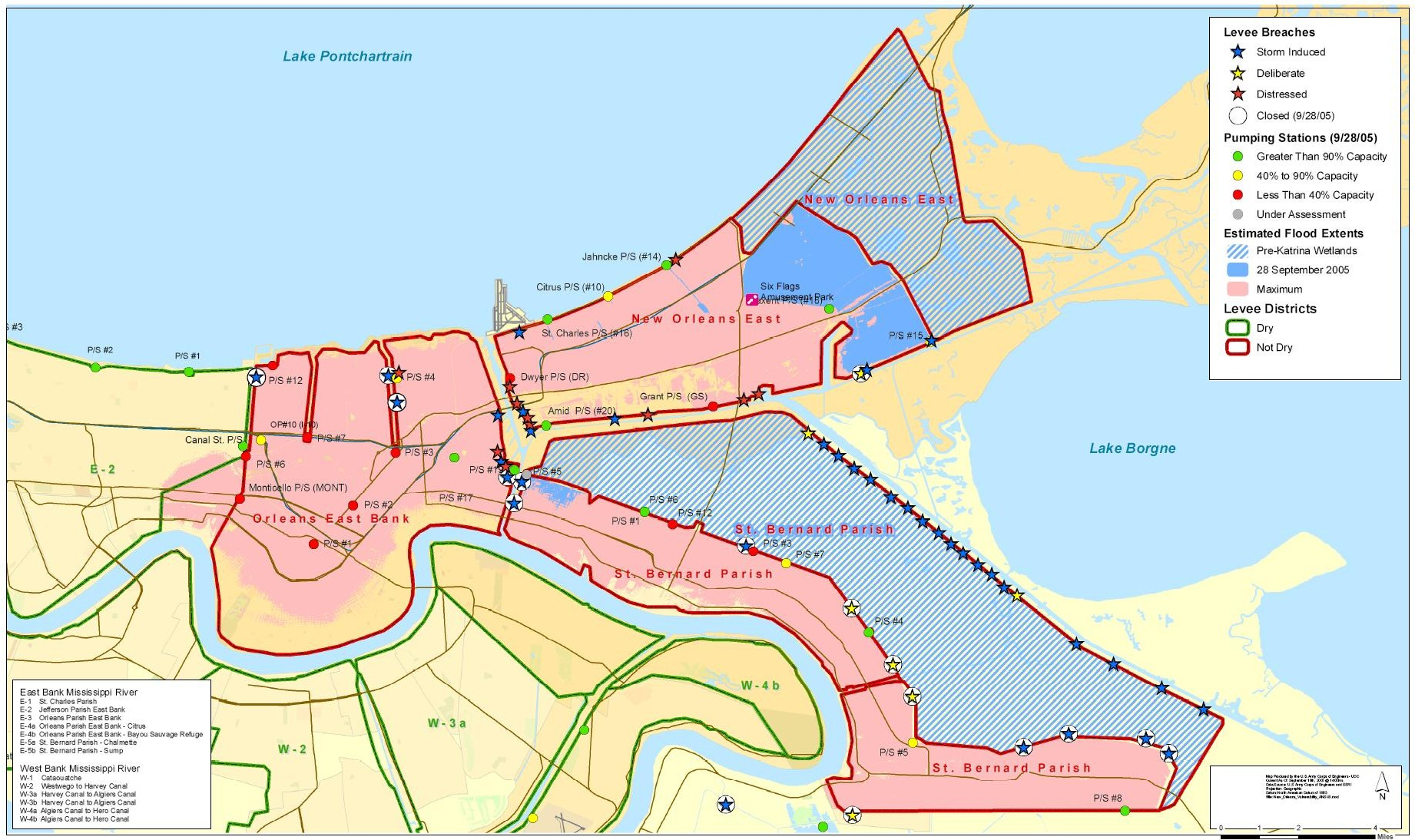
A map of levee breaches in New Orleans

There were over 50 breaches of the flood protection during Hurricane Katrina. This protection, called the Lake Pontchartrain and Vicinity Hurricane Protection Project (LPVHPP) was authorized by Congress in 1965 and tasked the Army Corps of Engineers with responsibility for its conception, design and construction. The LPVHPP was initially estimated to take 13 years, but when Katrina's surge arrived in 2005, parts of the project were 60-90% complete with a revised completion date of 2015.

In the immediate aftermath, three teams of engineers assembled evidence implicating design flaws in two floodwalls in New Orleans' main basin and that a little-used navigation channel amplified storm surge contributing to a third floodwall collapse in the east side of the city.

On April 5, 2006, Lieutenant General Carl A. Strock, chief of engineers and commander of the Army Corps, testified before the U.S. Senate Subcommittee on Energy and Water that "...we have now concluded that we did have a problem with the design of the structures..."

According to the American Geosciences Institute, there were twenty Senate and House Committee hearings on Hurricane Katrina in the six months following the catastrophe. In the decade following Katrina there were seven major levee failure investigations. One of these was convened and managed by the Army Corps and was called the Interagency Performance Evaluation Taskforce. The American Society of Civil Engineers (ASCE) was tasked by the Army Corps to peer-review the IPET. The ASCE's June 2007 report determined that the major failures of the levees and flood walls in New Orleans were the result of system design and construction flaws. According to a modeling exercise conducted by the U.S. Army Corps of Engineers (USACE), two-thirds of the deaths in Greater New Orleans were due to levee and flood wall failure.

In January 2008, Judge Stanwood Duval of the U.S. District Court ruled that despite the Corps' role in the flooding, the agency could not be held financially liable because of sovereign immunity in the Flood Control Act of 1928.

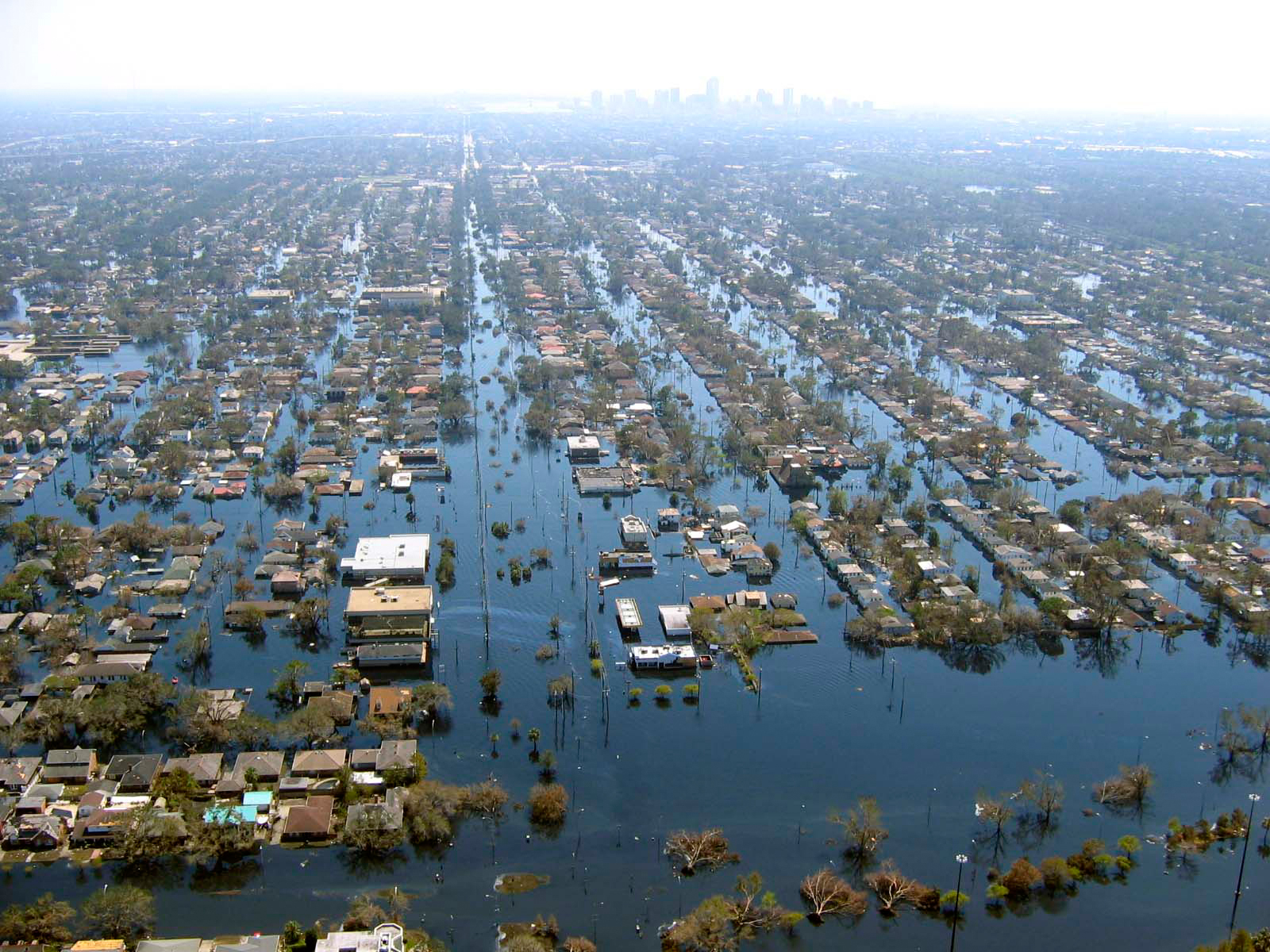
View of flooded New Orleans in the aftermath of Hurricane Katrina

All of the major studies in the aftermath of Katrina concluded that the USACE was responsible for the failure of the levees. This was primarily attributed to a decision to use shorter steel sheet pilings during construction in an effort to save money. According to a report published in August 2015 in the official journal of the World Water Council, the Corps misinterpreted the results of a 1985 study and wrongly concluded that sheet piles in the flood walls needed to be driven to depths of only 17 feet (5 m) instead of between 31 and 46 feet (9 and 14 m). That decision saved approximately $100 million, but significantly reduced overall engineering reliability.

Exactly ten years after Katrina, J. David Rogers, lead author of a new report in the official journal of the World Water Council, concluded that the flooding during Katrina "could have been prevented had the corps retained an external review board to double-check its flood-wall designs".

Other factors may have contributed to the flooding. According to the authors of Catastrophe in the Making (Island Press, 2009), the straight design and lack of outward flow into the Gulf allowed the Mississippi River-Gulf Outlet Canal to become "the perfect shortcut for salt-water intrusion", which damaged buffering cypress forests and wetlands that historically had protected New Orleans from storm surge. The Army Corps of Engineers built and maintained the canal. Furthermore, according to storm surge researcher Hassan Mashriqui:

Storm surge pushing across shallow Lake Borgne from the east is constrained by these MRGO levees to the south and, to the north, by the long-standing levees of the Intracoastal Waterway (GIWW). Initially ten or more miles apart, these two channels meet, and when they do, the water building between their levees is squeezed into a single channel – the Funnel – only 260 yards wide, constrained by levees 14 feet to 16 feet high....In concert with the denuded marshes, it could increase the local storm surge hitting the Intracoastal Waterway by 20 percent to 40 percent – a critical and fundamental flaw.

In June 2008, the Army Corps New Orleans District submitted a Deep-Draft De-authorization Study of the MRGO which stated that "an economic evaluation of channel navigation use does not demonstrate a Federal interest in continued operation and maintenance of the channel." Congress ordered the MRGO closed as a direct result.

=== Media involvement ===
Katrina's wind and water sliced up commination webs that journalists needed. "Electricity was out. Landlines and telephone switching stations were being submerged. Some cell phone towers had lost power; others had been knocked over." In this chaos, news crews sometimes became conduits for information about stranded survivors, locating victims and relaying their locations to rescue authorities. One illustration was when Geraldo Rivera of Fox News tearfully pleaded for authorities to either send help or evacuate the thousands of evacuees stranded at the Ernest N. Morial Convention Center. With telephone service, electrical power, and television broadcasting severely disrupted, radio became an important source of emergency information after Katrina. WWL AM-870 was one of the few area radio stations in the area remaining on the air, and broadcast information from public officials and calls from residents seeking assistance. Also, in response to Katrina, a consortium of radio stations was created and led by WWL-AM on September 1, 2005, as an emergency service called the United Radio Broadcasters of New Orleans. Their ongoing nighttime broadcasts continued to be available up to 500 mi (800 km) away. Announcers continued to broadcast from improvised studio facilities after the storm damaged their main studios.

Some journalists repeated unsubstantiated rumors of mayhem. Not only were many of these reports untrue, but these uncorroborated reports further delayed relief efforts. For example, exaggerated reports scared away truck and bus drivers who could have furnished people with much-needed supplies. The rumors also were seen as causing anxiety to already traumatized survivors who heard the rumors on their transistor radios. The Select Bipartisan Committee Report published in February 2006 acknowledged that the near-total destruction of communications infrastructure made fact corroboration difficult. Nonetheless, the committee believed that those chaotic circumstances made accurate reporting even more important. They wrote, "Skepticism and fact-checking are easier when the sea is calm, but more vital when it is not."

Staff of New Orleans Times-Picayune at Pulitzer Award Ceremony. May 22, 2006

Katrinas winds and water rendered worthless the printing presses and broadcast towers for the local newspaper, the New Orleans Times-Picayune forcing it to move online to NOLA.com its web affiliate for days. NOLA.com became an important conduit for rescue operations because its managing editor posted hundreds of pleas from people stranded in flooded New Orleans. The site also became an important resource for locating missing residents and reuniting families scattered by the disaster. The aggregation of community journalism, user photos, and the use of the internet site as a collaborative response to the storm attracted international attention and was called a watershed moment in journalism. "For its courageous and aggressive coverage of Hurricane Katrina," the staff of the Times-Picayune was awarded the 2006 Pulitzer Prize in Breaking News Reporting and shared the Public Service Pulitzer with the Biloxi-based Sun Herald. In the wake of the Times-Picayune's online-only efforts, the Pulitzer Prize committee, for the first time opened all its categories to online entries.

As the U.S. military and rescue services regained control over the city, there were restrictions on the activity of the media. On September 9, the military leader of the relief effort announced that reporters would have "zero access" to efforts to recover bodies in New Orleans. Immediately following this announcement, CNN filed a lawsuit and obtained a temporary restraining order against the ban. The next day the government backed down and reversed the ban.

In September 2022, the Associated Press issued a style guide change to Katrina stating that reporters when writing about the storm in New Orleans should note that "...levee failures played a major role in the devastation in New Orleans. In some stories, that can be as simple as including a phrase about Hurricane Katrina's catastrophic levee failures and flooding...."

=== Studies concerning post-Katrina victims ===
An article published in the Community Mental Health Journal from January 2016 revealed information about a recent study on the psychosocial needs of Hurricane Katrina evacuees that temporarily resided in Dallas, Texas. More than one-fourth of the sample met the criteria for major depressive disorder (MDD). About one-third of the individuals received a referral to mental health services for meeting symptom criteria for incident MDD and PTSD.

In a study published in Maternal and Child Health Journal, five to seven years after the disaster, 308 New Orleans pregnant women were interviewed about their exposure to Katrina. Researchers found that there were associations between experiencing damage during Katrina and birthweight, leading researchers to conclude that natural disasters may have long-term effects on pregnancy outcomes. Furthermore, it was concluded that women who are most vulnerable to disaster may be more vulnerable to poor pregnancy outcome.

From a September 2015 journal of Current Psychology, a study examined the attitudes of older, long-term residents of Baton Rouge, Louisiana toward displaced newcomers to their community. After using multiple tests, analyses, and descriptive statistics, the study suggested residents grew to become more patient, tolerant, and friendly towards newcomers. The study also suggests, however, that residents felt more fearful and suspicious of the evacuees, as well as the fact that they were being taken advantage of more.

== Reconstruction ==
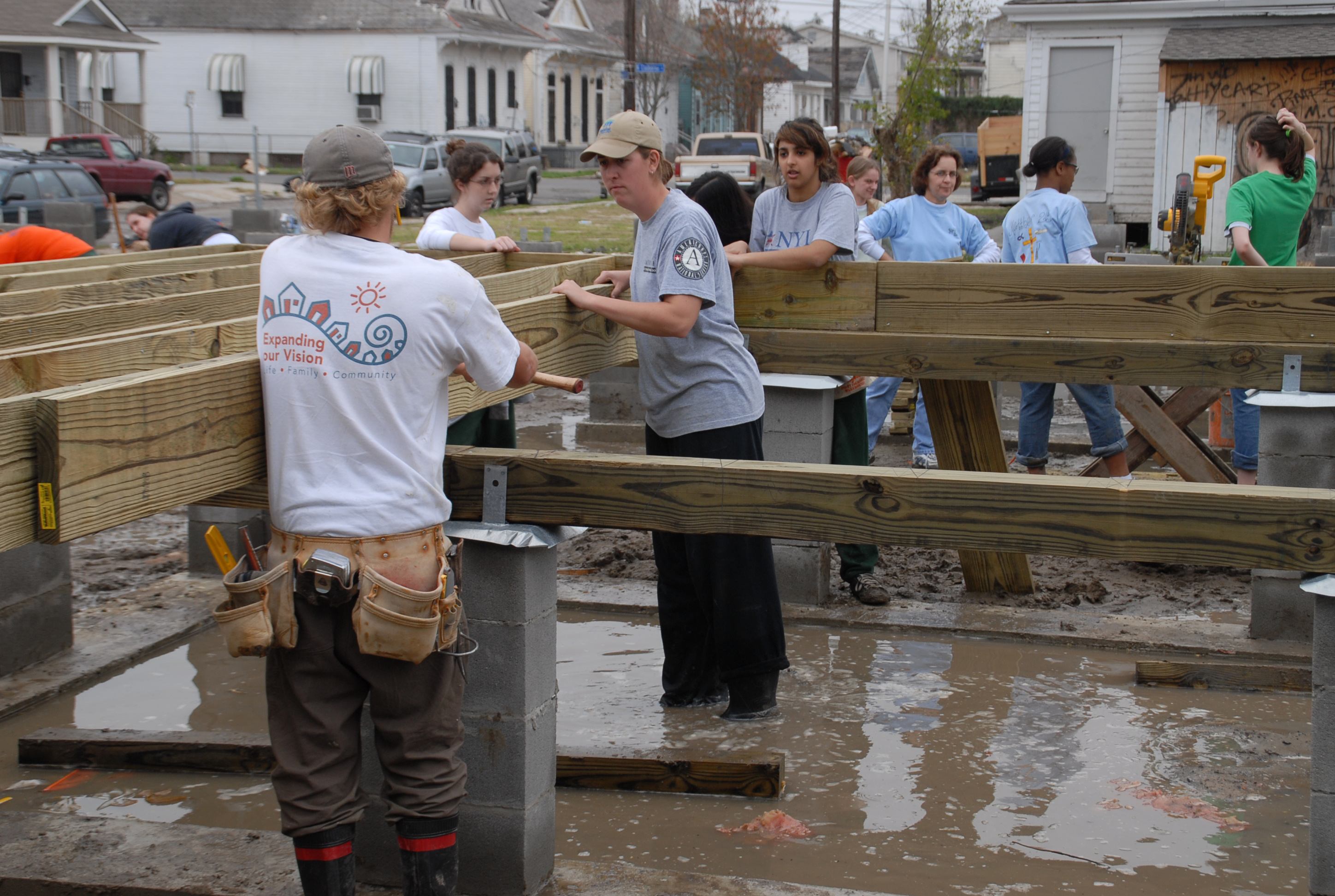
Volunteers from AmeriCorps in New Orleans, January 2006

About 90,000 square miles of land area was damaged by Hurricane Katrina and about 300,000 homes were destroyed or made unlivable. Up to 600,000 households were displaced a month later and in New Orleans where flooding was primarily due to levee failure, about 80% of the city was flooded.

Initially, the Army Corps created Task Force Guardian to provide an interim level of protection to get the city of New Orleans through the 2005 hurricane season and in the longer term restore the city's ability to resist a Category 3 hurricane by June of 2006.

There were funding disagreements over who should pay for permanent levee improvements. In February 2008, the Bush administration requested that the state of Louisiana pay about $1.5 billion of an estimated $7.2 billion for the Army Corps' levee work (in accordance with cost-sharing rules stipulated in the Flood Control Act of 1928), a request which angered many Louisiana leaders. On May 2, 2008, Louisiana Governor Bobby Jindal used a speech to The National Press Club to request that President Bush free up money to complete work on Louisiana's levees. Bush promised to include the levee funding in his 2009 budget but rejected the idea of including the funding in a war bill, which would pass sooner.

In mid-2009, the Army Corps submitted the LACPR (Louisiana Coastal Protection and Restoration) Final Technical Report to the U.S. Congress which informally identified areas where rebuilding should be discouraged in favor of property buyouts or relocation.

The Technical Report includes:

- locations of possible new levees to be built
- suggested existing levee modifications
- "Inundation Zones", "Water depths less than 14 feet, Raise-In-Place of Structures", "Water depths greater than 14 feet, Buyout of Structures", "Velocity Zones" and "Buyout of Structures" areas for four different scenarios.

Since Katrina, the Army Corps has made a $14.45 billion investment in the area around New Orleans and provided 100% of the cost. The four largest projects are:

- The Gulf Intracoastal Waterway West Closure Complex which can pump 1 million US gallons (3,800 m^{3}) per minute at a cost of $1 billion,
- The IHNC Lake Borgne Surge Barrier which is about 1.8 miles long and large enough to appear clearly in high-resolution satellite images,
- The Seabrook Floodgate, connecting the Lake Pontchartrain with the Industrial Canal, a major navigation channel, and
- The Permanent Canal Closures and Pumps (PCCP) system––gates and pump stations at the mouths of the three largest drainage canals in New Orleans that prevent storm surge from entering the city via Lake Pontchartrain.

== Records ==
Katrina is the costliest tropical cyclone on record, tying with Hurricane Harvey in 2017. The storm was the fourth-most intense Atlantic hurricane on record to make landfall in the contiguous United States, behind the 1935 Labor Day hurricane, Hurricane Camille, in 1969, and Hurricane Michael in 2018. Katrina was also the earliest eleventh-named storm in the Atlantic until Tropical Storm Kyle surpassed it on August 14, 2020, beating Katrina by 10 days.

== See also ==
- List of Category 5 Atlantic hurricanes
- List of Florida hurricanes (2000–present)
- Wetlands of Louisiana
- Crescent Rising
- Hurricanes and climate change
- Hurricane Katrina in fiction
- Hurricane on the Bayou – 2006 documentary film by Greg MacGillivray
- Katrina Aid Today – Relief charity in the United States
- Timeline of Hurricane Katrina
- U.S. Army Corps of Engineers civil works controversies (New Orleans) – 20–21st century political controversies
- List of conspiracy theories
- List of notable media in the field of meteorology
- Memorial Medical Center and Hurricane Katrina

== Notes ==
Preceded by Andrew	Costliest Atlantic hurricanes on record 2005	Succeeded by Harvey (currently tied)
