= Katrina Aid Today =

Relief charity in the United States

Katrina Aid Today is a relief charity in the United States, that works to provide long term recovery support to survivors of Hurricane Katrina. United Methodist Committee on Relief (UMCOR), the humanitarian relief and development agency of the United Methodist Church, manages the U.S. Department of Homeland Security's Federal Emergency Management Agency (FEMA) sponsored program. Nine national partners and sixteen local organizations, who specialize in availability of benefits, resources and services, aim to deliver assistance to 300,000 of the most vulnerable survivors in the United States.

Consortium agencies work from offices in 31 U.S. states utilizing case managers to assist people that have been affected by the storm. In addition to the $66 million grant funds from FEMA, donated by foreign governments, consortium members have also committed an estimated $35 million ($5 million from UMCOR) including in-kind contributions totaling $101 million for long term recovery.

The program aims to assist survivors by the creation of recovery plans, identification of unmet needs, and facilitating access to necessary resources. Case management through this program is facilitated nationally through the use of standardized forms and direct data entry into CAN: Coordinated Assistance Network – a web-based database developed by the American Red Cross.

UMCOR established its case management system during recovery from Hurricane Andrew and improved it during the September 11 attacks. Partners were selected based on nonprofit status, national volunteer network capacity and case management experience. Grassroots organizations were selected based on a similar evaluation process and are funded by UMCOR private funds.

== Consortium members ==
National:

- The Salvation Army
- Catholic Charities USA
- Lutheran Disaster Response
- Volunteers of America
- Episcopal Relief and Development
- National Disability Rights Network
- Society of Saint Vincent de Paul
- Boat People SOS (BPSOS)
- Odyssey House

Local: These organizations work to expand the reach of the nine-member consortium through their service to special populations of Hurricane Katrina evacuees.

- Accepting Challenges to Improve Our Nation (ACTION), Houston, TX
- Advocacy Inc, Dallas, TX
- Disability Rights Florida, Tallahassee, FL
- Asian Social Services Center, Philadelphia, PA
- Autauga County Family Support Center, Prattville, AL
- Hope Community Services Inc., Orange County, CA
- Interchurch Ministries of Nebraska, Lincoln, NE
- Mennonite Central Committee and El Comité de Récuperacion, Houston, TX
- Metropolitan Tulsa Urban League, Tulsa, OK
- National Spinal Cord Injury Association, (NSCIA) Bethesda, MD
- New Concept Staff Development Center, Inc., Milwaukee, WI
- Sabathani Community Center, Minneapolis, MN
- Sts. Joachim and Ann Care Services, St. Charles, MO
- Texas Interagency-Interfaith Disaster Response, Austin, TX
- United Way of Central Iowa, Des Moines, IA
- UNITY of Greater New Orleans, New Orleans, LA
- Workforce Essentials Inc., Clarksville, TN
- Urban League of Metropolitan Seattle, Seattle, WA
