= Maternal and Child Health Journal =

- Discipline: Obstetrics, pediatric nursing
- Language: English
- Edited by: Timothy Dye

Publication details
- History: 1997-present
- Publisher: Springer Science+Business Media
- Frequency: Quarterly
- Impact factor: 1.788 (2016)

Standard abbreviations
- ISO 4: Matern. Child Health J.

Indexing
- CODEN: MCHJFB
- ISSN: 1092-7875 (print); 1573-6628 (web)

Links
- Journal homepage; Online access

The Maternal and Child Health Journal is a quarterly peer-reviewed medical journal covering maternal and child health. It was established in 1997 and is published by Springer Science+Business Media. It is sponsored by, among other organizations, the Association of Maternal and Child Health Programs, the Association of Teachers of Maternal and Child Health, and CityMatCH. The editor-in-chief is Timothy Dye (University of Rochester School of Medicine). According to the Journal Citation Reports, the journal has a 2016 impact factor of 1.788.
