= Lists of disasters =

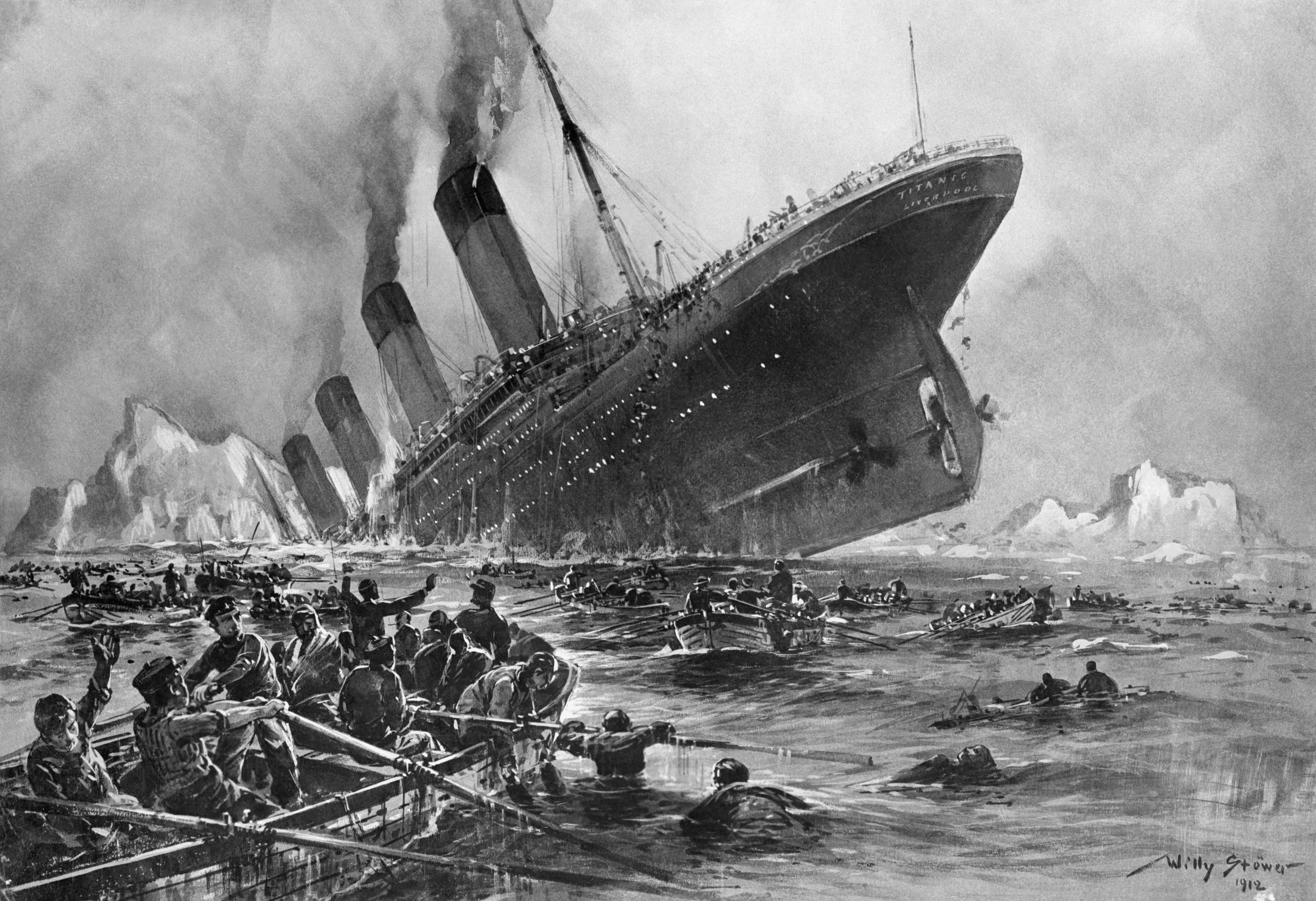
Sinking of the RMS Titanic, 1912

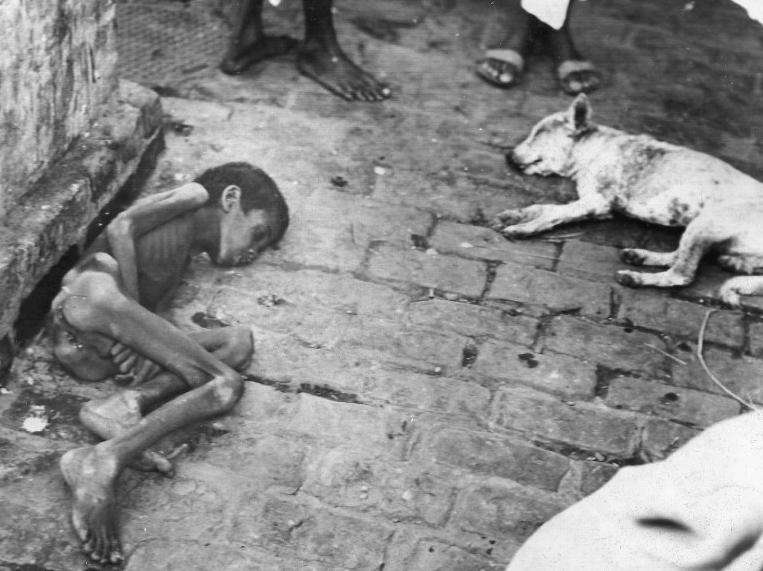
Starvation in Bengal, 1943

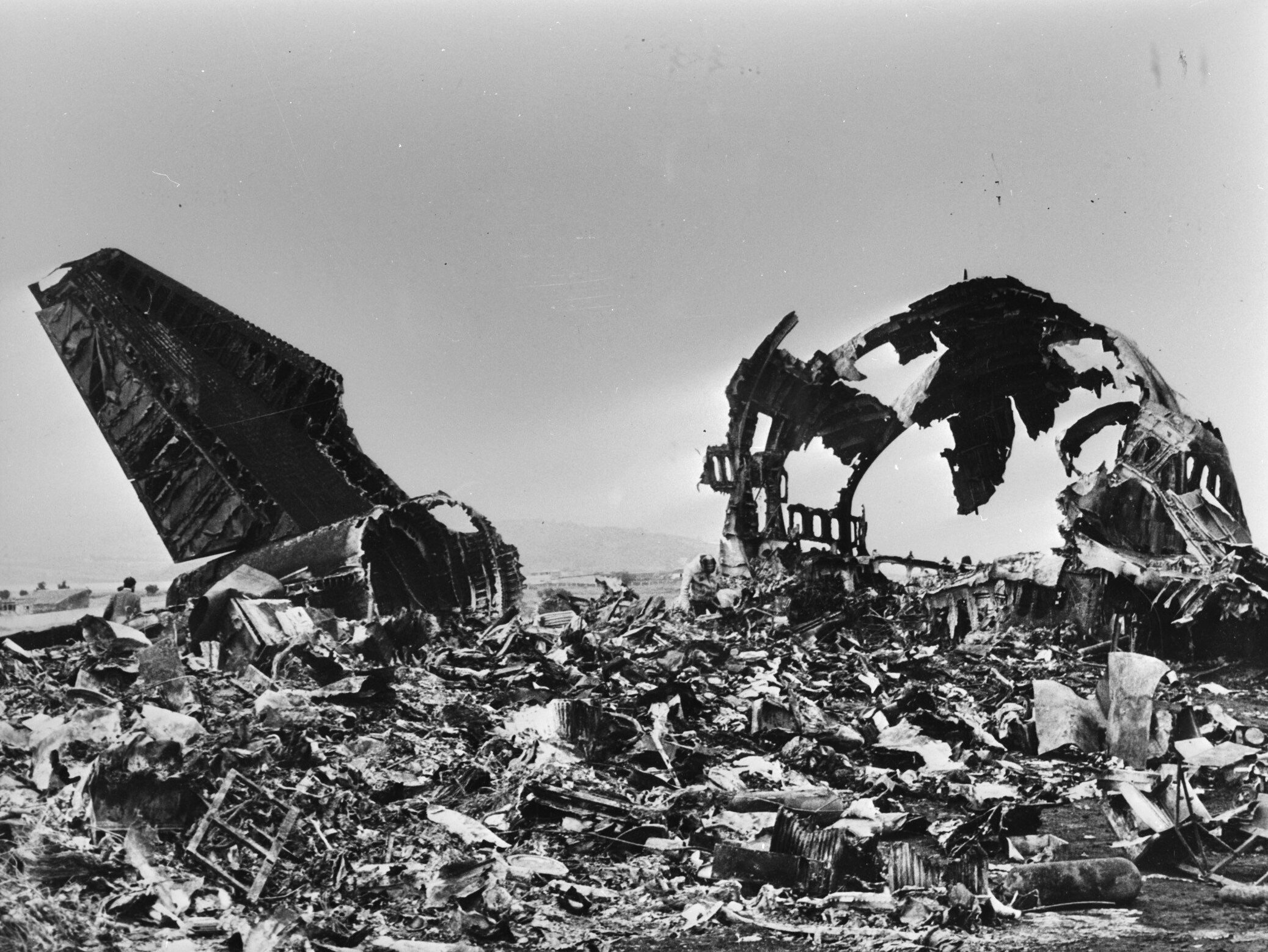
Tenerife airport disaster, 1977

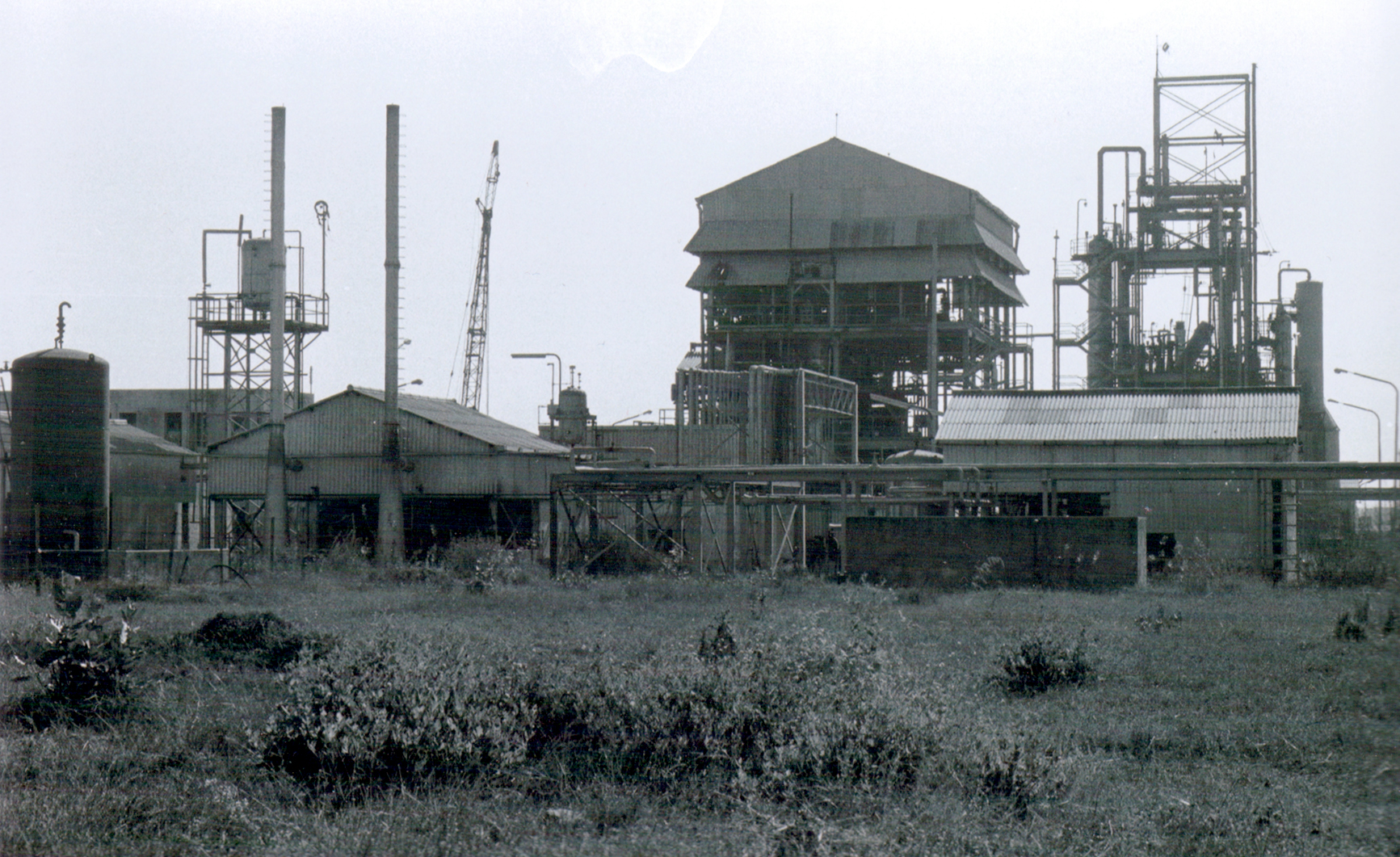
Bhopal Gas Tragedy, 1984

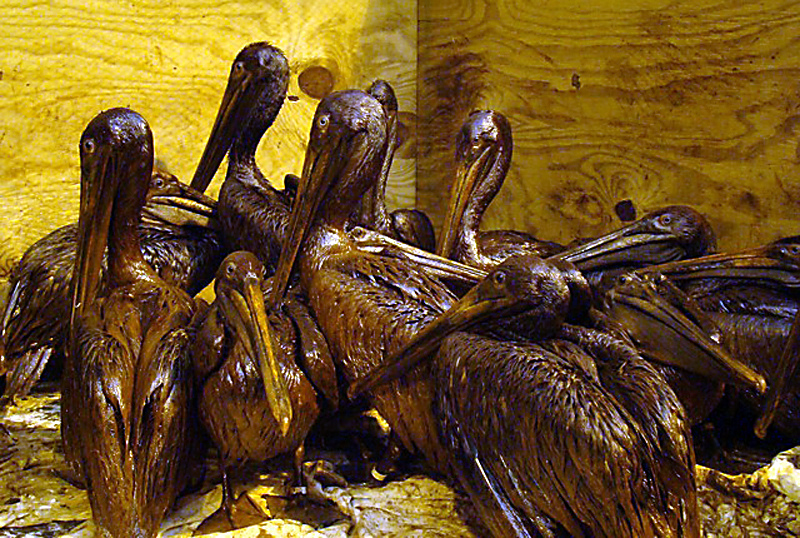
Oil in Gulf of Mexico, 2010

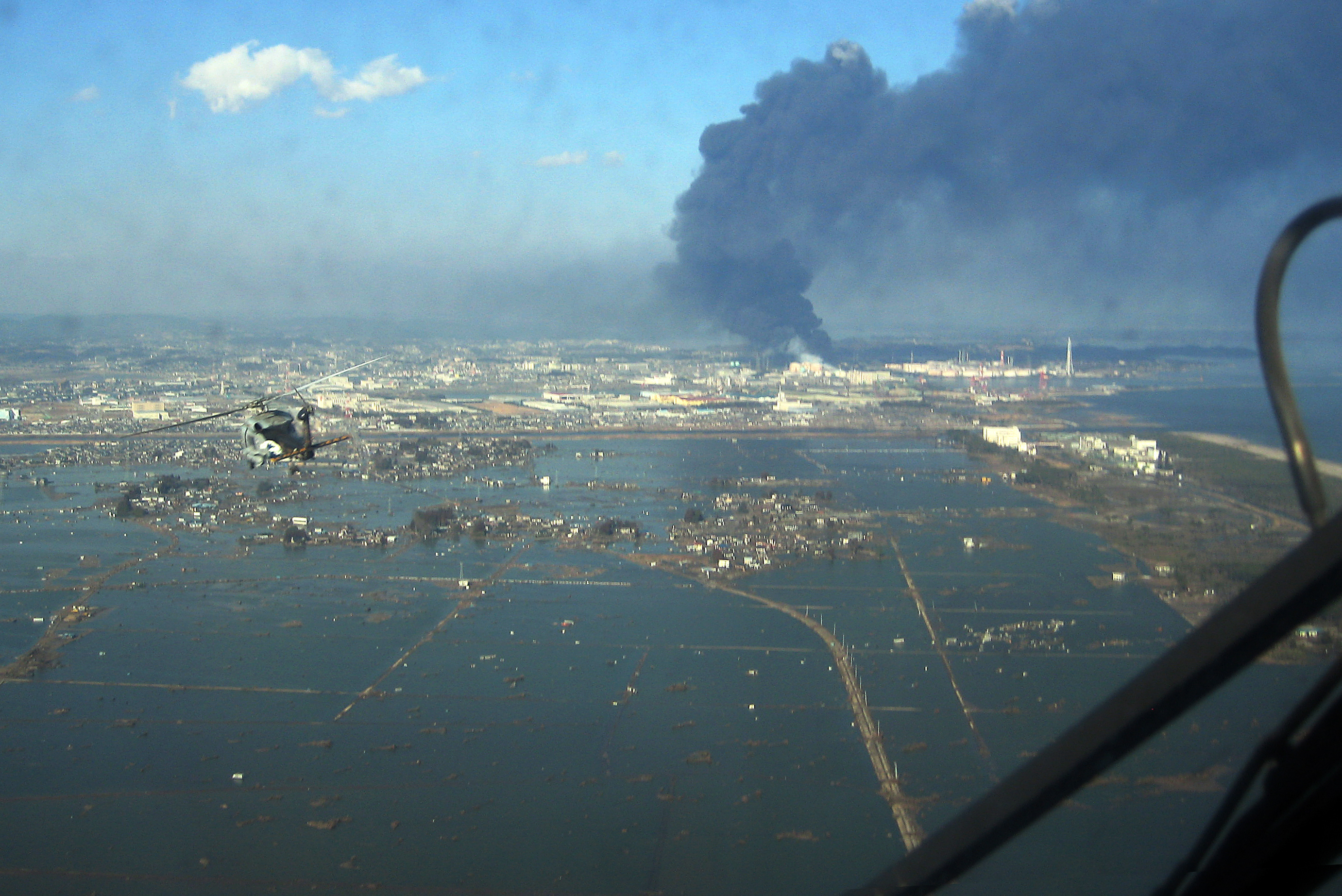
Tōhoku Earthquake, 2011

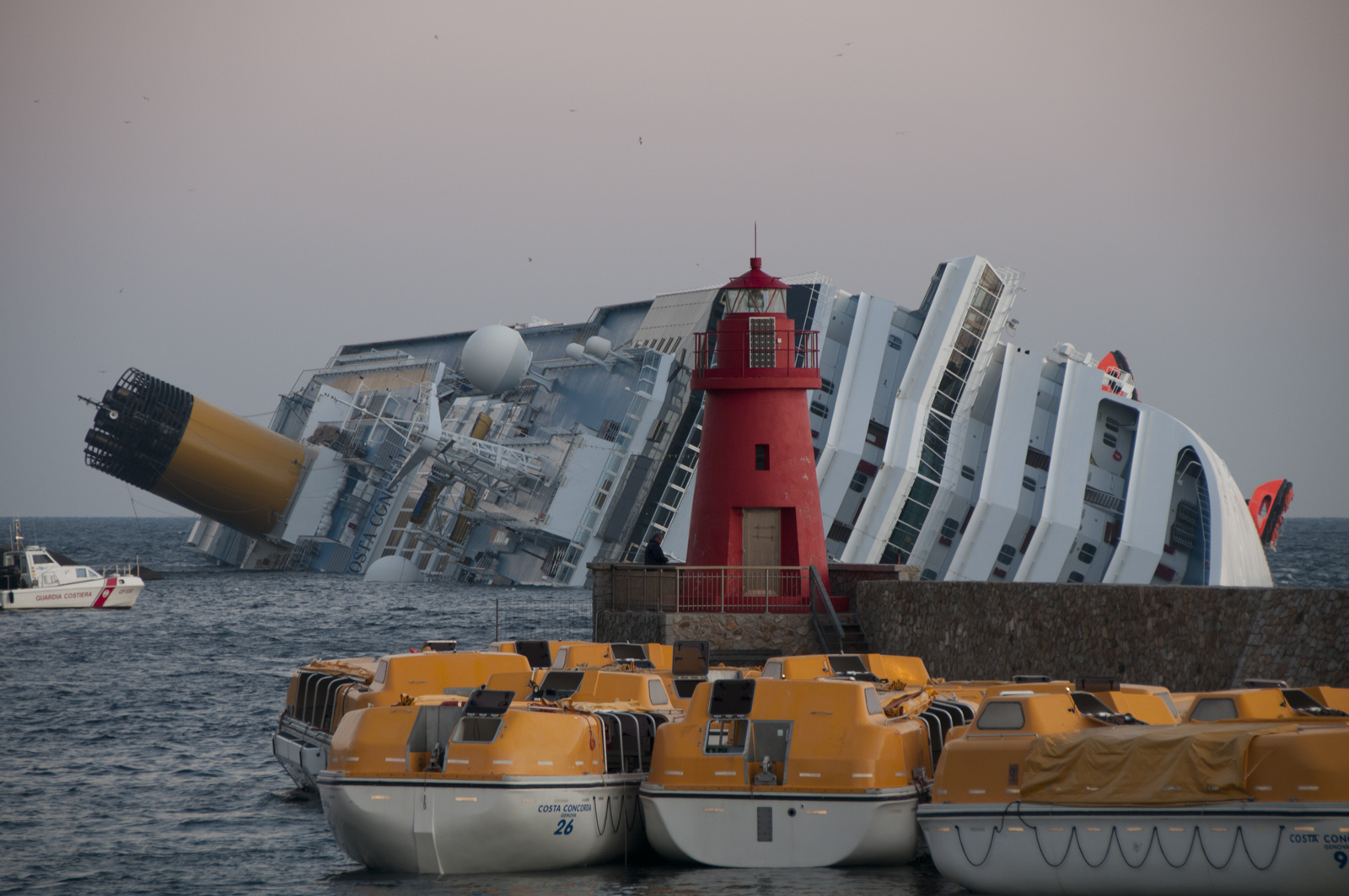
Grounding of Costa Concordia, 2012

Moore Tornado, 2013

The following are lists of disasters.

== Natural disasters ==
A natural disaster is the highly harmful impact on a society or community following a natural hazard event. These lists are lists of natural disasters:

- List of avalanches
- List of blizzards
- List of derecho events
- List of droughts
- Lists of earthquakes
- List of fires
  - List of wildfires
  - List of California wildfires
- List of floods
  - History of flooding in Canada
  - List of deadliest floods
  - List of flash floods
  - List of floods in the Netherlands
  - List of floods in Pakistan
  - List of floods in Sheffield
- List of heat waves
- List of ice storms
- List of landslides
- List of natural disasters by death toll
- List of solar storms
- Lists of tornadoes and tornado outbreaks
- Lists of retired tropical cyclone names
- List of historical tropical cyclone names
- Outline of tropical cyclones
- List of tsunamis
- List of large volcanic eruptions
  - List of volcanic eruptions 1500–2000
  - List of volcanic eruptions in the 21st century
  - List of volcanic eruptions by death toll

== Disasters caused by accidental human action ==
These are lists of disasters caused by accidental human action.

- List of accidents and disasters by death toll

=== Transport ===
- List of aviation accidents and incidents
  - List of accidents and incidents involving commercial aircraft
  - Lists of accidents and incidents involving military aircraft
  - List of airship accidents
  - List of ballooning accidents
  - List of accidents and incidents involving helicopters
- List of elevator accidents
- List of maritime disasters
  - List of shipwrecks
  - List of boiler explosions
- List of rail accidents
  - List of boiler explosions
  - List of tram accidents
  - List of tanker explosions
- List of road accidents
  - List of tanker explosions
- List of spaceflight-related accidents and incidents

=== Industrial ===
- List of industrial disasters
- List of natural gas and oil production accidents in the United States
- List of structural failures and collapses
  - List of bridge failures
  - List of dam failures
  - List of levee failures
  - List of mast and tower collapses
  - List of modern infrastructure failures
- List of explosions
  - List of boiler explosions
  - List of boiling liquid expanding vapor explosions (BLEVE)
- List of major power outages
- List of mining disasters
  - List of coal mining accidents in China
  - List of gold mining disasters
  - List of mining disasters in Lancashire
  - List of mining disasters in Poland
- Nuclear and radiation accidents
  - Japanese nuclear incidents
  - List of civilian radiation accidents
  - List of Chernobyl-related articles
  - List of nuclear and radiation accidents by death toll
  - Lists of nuclear disasters and radioactive incidents
  - List of sunken nuclear submarines
- List of oil spills

=== Health ===
- List of famines
- List of food contamination incidents
- List of epidemics and pandemics
- List of mass evacuations
- List of medicine contamination incidents
- List of methanol poisoning incidents

== Disasters caused by deliberate human action ==
These are lists of disasters caused by deliberate human action or public endangerment or culpable negligence.

- List of amusement park accidents
- List of economic crises
- List of environmental disasters
- List of explosions
  - List of boiler explosions
  - List of boiling liquid expanding vapor explosions (BLEVE)
  - List of tanker explosions
- List of fires
  - List of building or structure fires
  - List of circus fires
  - List of hotel fires in the United States
  - List of nightclub fires
  - List of town and city fires
  - List of transportation fires
- List of fireworks accidents and incidents
- List of man-made mass poisoning incidents
- List of orphan radioactive source incidents
- List of crushes
- List of military disasters
- List of riots
- List of terrorist incidents
- List of wars
  - List of wars by death toll

== By location ==
- List of disasters in Antarctica
- List of disasters in Australia
- List of disasters in Canada
  - List of disasters in Canada by death toll
- List of disasters in Croatia
- List of disasters in Estonia
- List of disasters in Fiji
- List of disasters in Finland
- List of disasters in France
- List of disasters in Great Britain and Ireland
- List of disasters in Greece
- List of disasters in Haiti
- List of disasters in Indonesia
  - List of earthquakes in Indonesia
  - List of natural disasters in Indonesia
  - List of tsunamis affecting Indonesia
  - List of volcanoes in Indonesia
- List of disasters in Italy
- List of disasters in New Zealand
  - List of natural disasters in New Zealand
- List of disasters in Pakistan
- List of disasters in the Philippines
- List of disasters in Poland
- List of disasters in Singapore
- List of disasters in South Korea
  - List of man-made disasters in South Korea
- List of disasters in Spain
- List of disasters in Sweden
- List of disasters in Switzerland
- List of disasters in Taiwan
- List of disasters in Thailand
- List of disasters in the United States

== Other ==
- List of disasters by cost
- List of engineering blunders
