= Investigations of levee failures during Hurricane Katrina =

Overview of the seven major investigatons

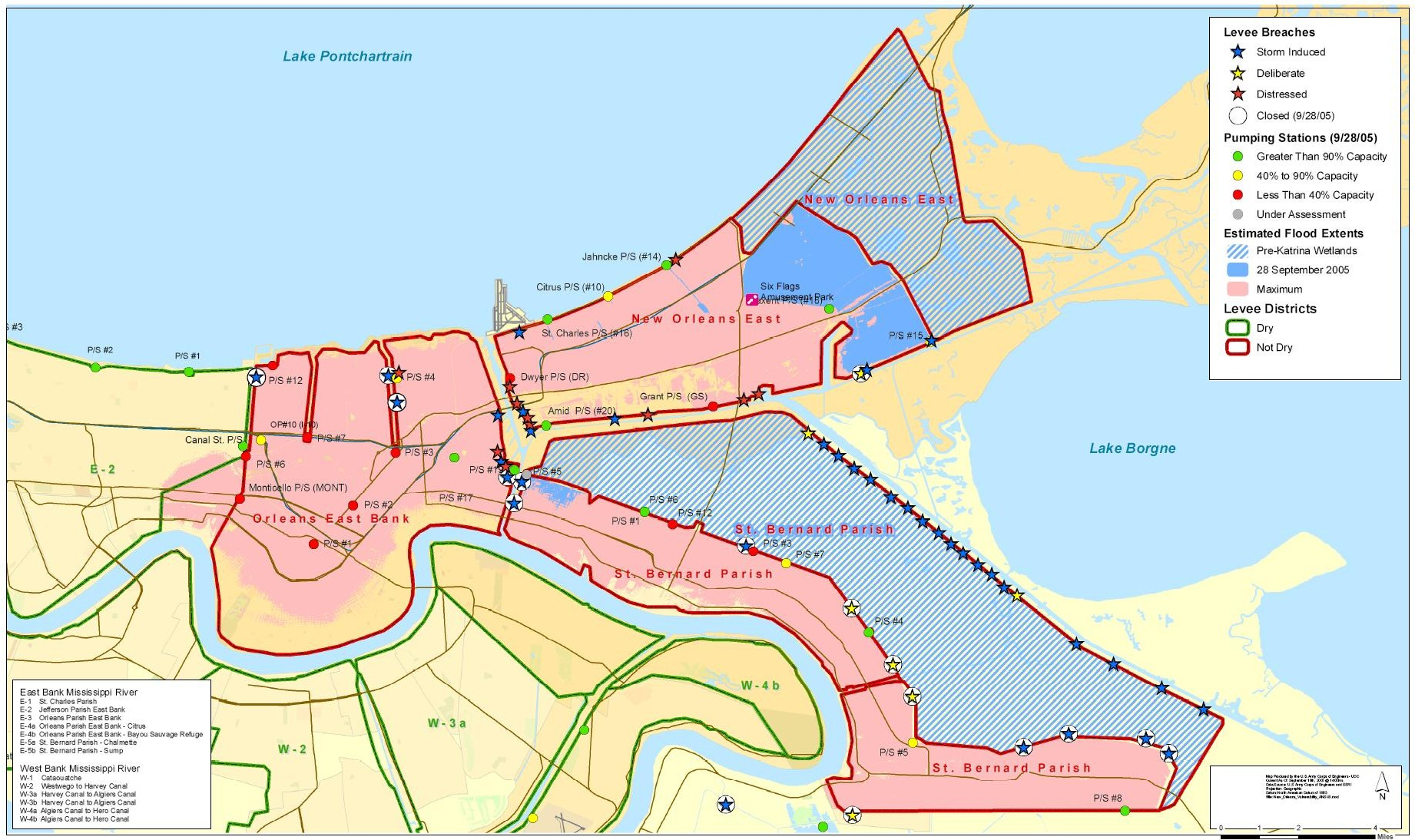
Levee breaches in the federally built Hurricane Protection System and the resulting flooding that occurred on August 29, 2005, in the New Orleans vicinity

After Hurricane Katrina on August 29, 2005, seven major investigations were conducted by civil engineers and other experts in an attempt to identify the cause of the flooding. Specifically, the investigators searched for the underlying reasons for the failure of protective system of levees and floodwalls encircling the city of New Orleans and the region. This system was called the Lake Pontchartrain and Vicinity Hurricane Protection Project (LPVHPP). All concurred that the primary cause of the failure was inadequate design and construction of the LPVHPP by the United States Army Corps of Engineers (Army Corps).

There were over 50 failures of the federally authorized LPVHPP (levees and flood walls protecting New Orleans, Louisiana, and two suburbs) while Hurricane Katrina passed to the east as a Category 3 hurricane on the Saffir–Simpson scale. The failures caused flooding in 80% of New Orleans, a small portion of Jefferson Parish and nearly all of St. Bernard Parish.

Responsibility for the design and construction of the LPVHPP belongs to the Army Corps. Responsibility for maintenance of completed sections of the project belongs to the local levee districts as stipulated in the Flood Control Act of 1965.

In September 2022, the Associated Press issued a style guide change to Hurricane Katrina stating that reporters when writing about the flooding in New Orleans should note that “…levee failures played a major role in the devastation in New Orleans. In some stories, that can be as simple as including a phrase about Hurricane Katrina’s catastrophic levee failures and flooding….”

On January 4, 2023, the National Hurricane Center (NHC) updated the Katrina fatality data based on Rappaport (2014). The new toll reduced the number by about one quarter from an estimated 1,833 to 1,392. The Rappaport analysis wrote that the 2005 storm "…stands apart not just for the enormity of the losses, but for the ways in which most of the deaths occurred." The same NHC report also revised the total damage estimate keeping Hurricane Katrina as the costliest storm ever––$190 billion according to NOAA's National Centers for Environmental Information.

== Background ==
Vertical cross-section of New Orleans, showing maximum levee height of 23 feet (7 m) at the Mississippi River on the left and 17.5 feet (5 m) at Lake Pontchartrain on the right

The original residents of New Orleans settled on the high ground along the Mississippi River. Later developments eventually extended to nearby Lake Pontchartrain, built upon fill to bring them above the average lake level. Navigable commercial waterways extended from the lake to downtown. After 1940, the state decided to close those waterways following the completion of the Inner Harbor Navigation Canal for waterborne commerce, which opened in 1923. Closure of the waterways resulted in a lowering of the water table by the city's drainage system, causing some areas to settle by up to 8 feet (2 m) due to the compacting and desiccation of the underlying organic soils.

After the Great Mississippi Flood of 1927, United States Congress passed the Flood Control Act of 1928 which authorized the Army Corps to design and construct flood control structures, including levees, on the Mississippi River to protect populated areas from floods. It also affirmed the principle of local participation in federally funded projects. In addition, sovereign immunity was given to the Army Corps under Section 3 of the Flood Control Act of 1928, which states “no liability of any kind would attach or rest upon the United States for any damage from or by floods or flood waters at any place, provided that if on any stretch of the banks of the Mississippi River it was impracticable to construct levees." 33 U.S.C. § 702c. Section 702c is sometimes referred as "Section 3 of the act," based on where it appears in the Public law.

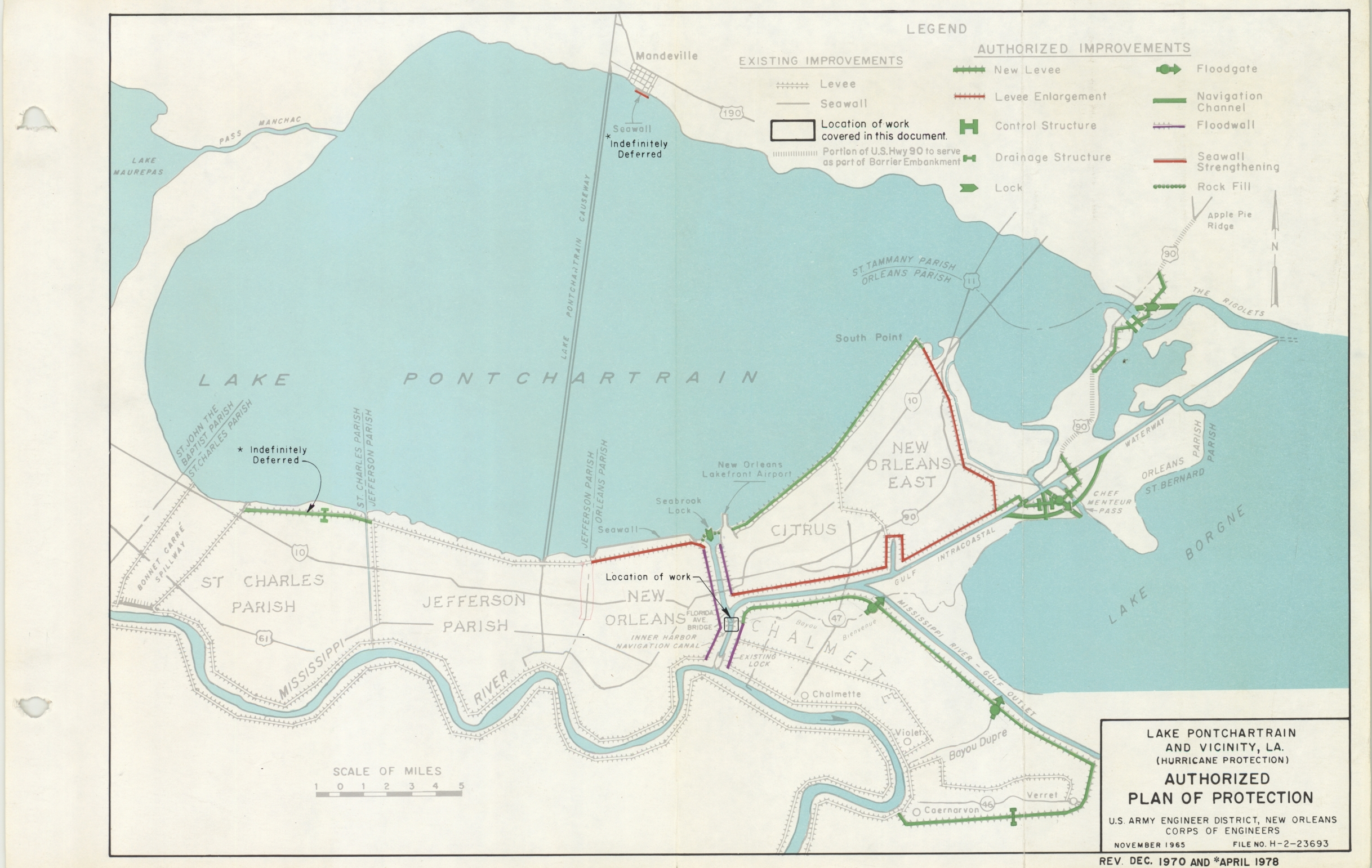
Authorized Plan of Protection for Lake Pontchartrain and Vicinity, Louisiana, November 1965. Map by U.S. Army Engineer District, New Orleans Corps of Engineers.

Multiple levee failures, heavy flooding and losses exceeding $1 billion during Hurricane Betsy in 1965 raised concerns about flooding from hurricanes. In response, Congress passed the Flood Control Act of 1965 which authorized the Army Corps to design and construct the region's hurricane flood protection. The project was called the Lake Pontchartrain and Vicinity Hurricane Protection Project (LPVHPP).

The 1965 act stipulated the principle of local funding participation in the amount of 30 percent and also stipulated that the local levee districts are responsible for maintenance of the completed project. The LPVHPP was initially estimated to take 13 years, but when Katrina struck in 2005, parts of the project were 60–90% complete with a revised projected completion date of 2015.

== Levee and floodwall breaches ==
In the city of New Orleans there were six major breaches of the Lake Pontchartrain and Vicinity Hurricane Protection Project.

1. Three major breaches occurred on the Inner Harbor Navigation Canal (locally known as the Industrial Canal). A breach on the northeast side near the junction with the Gulf Intracoastal Waterway flooded eastern New Orleans. Two breaches on the southeast side between Florida Avenue and Claiborne Avenue combined into a single 1,000-foot wide hole that allowed stormwater into the adjacent Lower Ninth Ward.
2. On the western edge of New Orleans near Hammond Highway, a breach opened in the 17th Street Canal levee. Floodwater flowed through a hole that became 450 feet wide, flooding the adjacent Lakeview neighborhood.
3. The London Avenue Canal in the Gentilly region, breached on both sides; on the west side near Robert E. Lee Boulevard and on the east near Mirabeau Avenue.

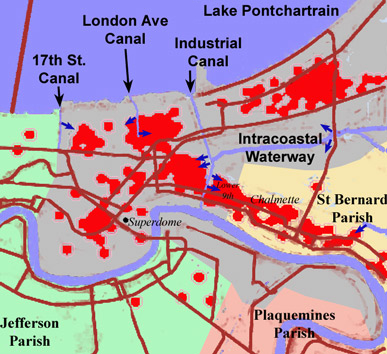
Sketch of New Orleans (shaded gray), indicating the locations of the principal breaches in the levees/floodwalls (dark blue arrows). Red dots show locations of deaths.

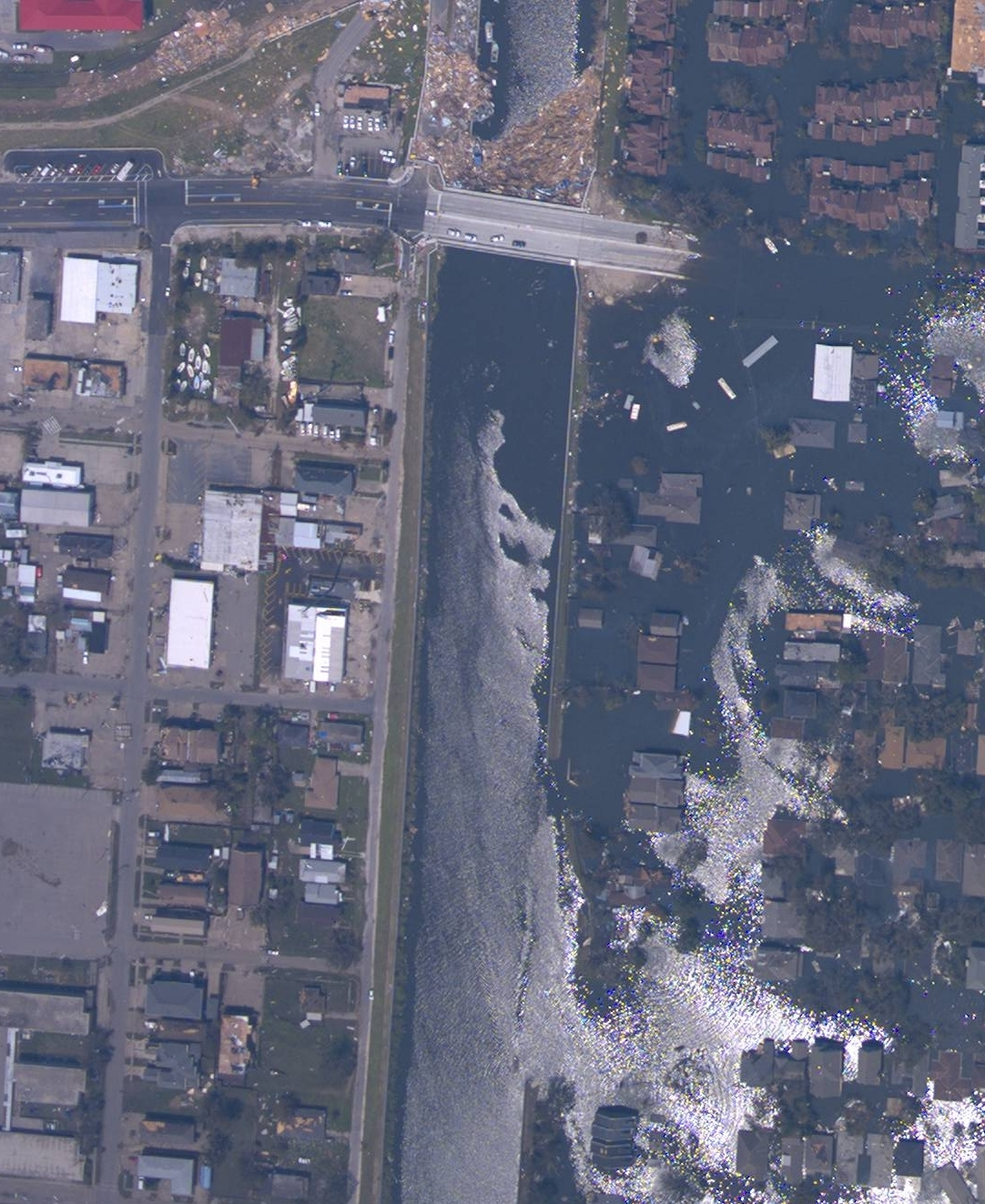
Breach in 17th Street Canal levee on August 31, showing the inundated Lakeview neighborhood on the right and the largely dry Metairie side on the left (NOAA)

There were 28 reported failures in the first 24 hours and over 50 were reported in the ensuing days. Before dawn on Monday August 29, 2005, waves overtopped and eroded the Mississippi River-Gulf Outlet Canal levees in St. Bernard Parish. At about 5:00 am, a 20-foot section of floodwall, called a "monolith," on the east side of the Industrial Canal, breached and released flood water into the Lower Ninth Ward. By 6:30 a.m. Central Time Zone (North America), levees along the Gulf Intracoastal Waterway, bordering the south side of eastern New Orleans, also overtopped and breached.

On the western edge of New Orleans, between 6 and 7:00 a.m., a 20-foot monolith on the east side of the London Avenue Canal failed and allowed water over 10 feet deep into the Fillmore Gardens neighborhood. At about 6:30 a.m., on the western edge of the city, several monoliths failed on the 17th Street Canal releasing stormwater into the Lakeview neighborhood. Local fire officials reported the breach. An estimated 66% to 75% of the city was then under water. In nearby Jefferson Parish, the Duncan and Bonnabel Pumping Stations were also reported to have suffered roof damage, and because they were unmanned, were non-functional.

At approximately 7:45 a.m, a much larger second hole opened up in the Industrial Canal just south of the initial breach. Floodwaters from the two breaches combined to submerge the entire Lower Ninth Ward in over 10 feet of water. Between 7 and 8:00 am, the west side of the London Avenue Canal breached, in addition to the east side, and flooded the adjacent mixed-race neighborhood of homeowners.

The Orleans Avenue Canal midway between the 17th Street Canal and the London Avenue Canal, engineered to the same standards as the latter two, survived intact due the presence of an unintended 100-foot-long ‘spillway,’ a section of legacy wall that was significantly lower than the adjacent floodwalls.

Storm surge also triggered breaches in about 20 places on the Mississippi River-Gulf Outlet Canal ("MR-GO") resulting in flooding of Saint Bernard Parish and the east bank of Plaquemines Parish.

== Levee failure investigations ==
=== Summary ===
According to the American Geosciences Institute, there were twenty Senate and House Committee meetings on Hurricane Katrina in the six months following the breach event. These took place between September 14, 2005, and February 2, 2006. There was no federally ordered independent commission like those ordered after the September 11 attacks and the Deepwater Horizon oil spill. "If the evidence points to human error, it may be difficult for the Corps to point the finger at itself or contractors it employed," said Mark Dombroff, a Washington lawyer and former chief of the torts branch of the Justice Department. In the next decade, there were seven major levee failure investigations.

=== Senate and House Committee hearings ===
On September 28, 2005, the Government Accountability Office testified before the House Subcommittee on Energy and Water Development, Committee on Appropriation. Their report cited the Flood Control Act of 1965 which authorized the Army Corps, from then forward, to be responsible for design and construction of the hurricane flood protection system enveloping New Orleans and also St. Bernard Parish. This was called the Lake Pontchartrain and Vicinity Hurricane Protection Project and also stipulated that the Orleans Levee District and the Lake Borgne Levee District retained the role of maintenance and operations after project completion.

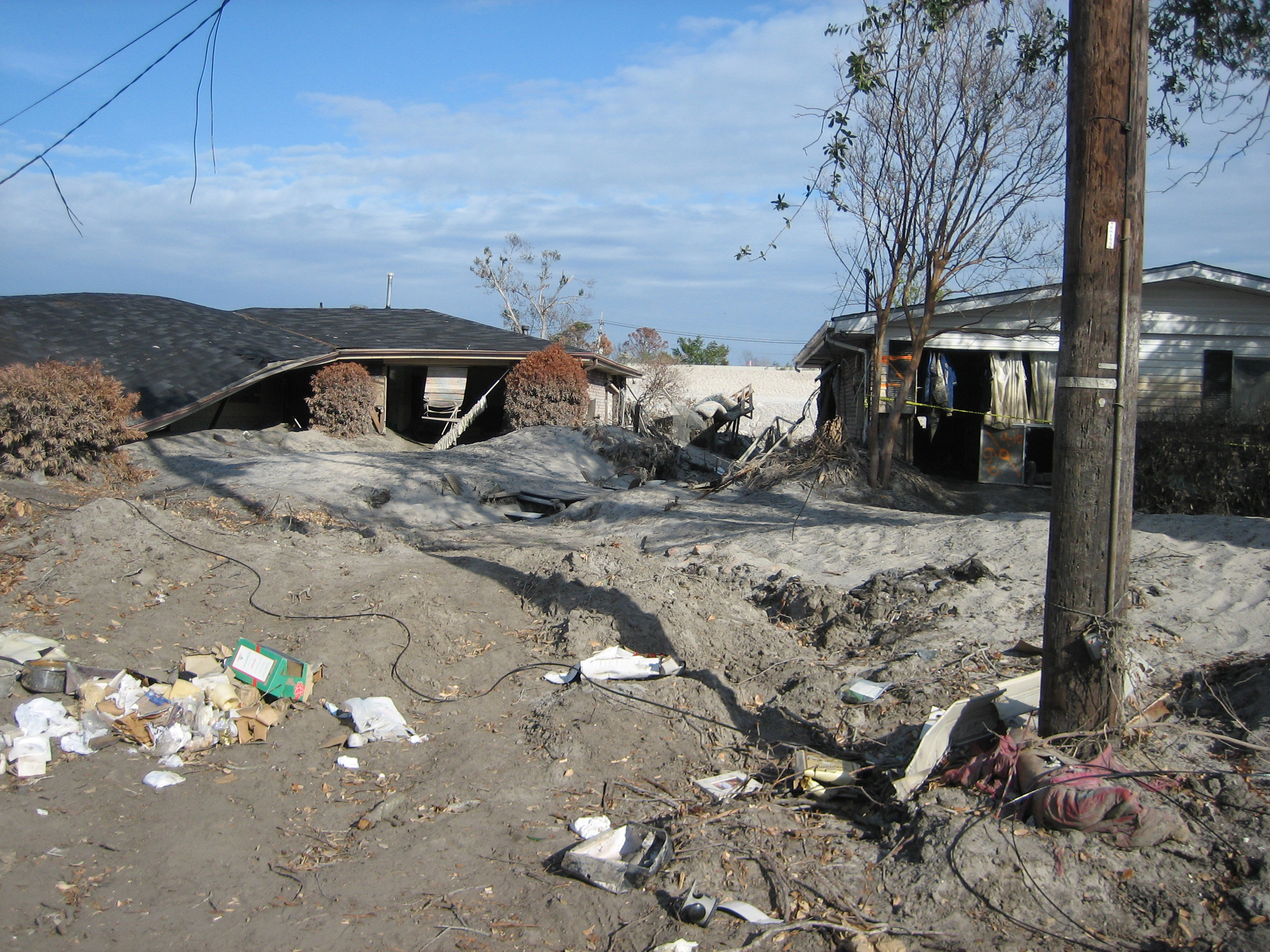
Severely damaged homes in piles of sand near the upper London Avenue Canal breach

On November 2, 2005, preliminary investigations and evidence were presented before the U.S. Senate Committee on Homeland Security and Governmental Affairs which generally confirmed the findings of the preliminary investigations.

On April 5, 2006, Lt. Gen. Carl Strock testified before the U.S. Senate Subcommittee on Energy and Water that "the Corps neglected to consider the possibility that floodwalls atop the 17th Street Canal levee would lurch away from their footings under significant water pressure and eat away at the earthen barriers below. We did not account for that occurring." Strock said it could be called a design failure. He also testified that the Army Corps did not know of this mechanism of failure prior to August 29, 2005.

=== Independent Levee Investigation Team (ILIT) ===
The first major study was conducted by the University of California, Berkeley and funded by the National Science Foundation. The three co-chairs were Dr. Robert Bea, Dr. Raymond Seed and Dr. J. David Rogers. The final report was released on July 31, 2006.

The investigators found that soil borings in the area of the 17th Street Canal breach showed a layer of peat starting at about 30 feet (9.1 m) below the surface, and ranging from about 5 feet (1.5 m) to 20 feet (6.1 m) thick. The shear strength of this peat was found to be very low and it had a high water content. According to co-chair Dr. Bea, the weak soil made the floodwall very vulnerable to the stresses of a large flood. "At 17th Street, the soil moved laterally, pushing entire wall sections with it. ... As Katrina's storm surge filled the canal, water pressure rose in the soil underneath the wall and in the peat layer. Water moved through the soil underneath the base of the wall. When the rising pressure and moving water overcame the soil's strength, it suddenly shifted, taking surrounding material – and the wall – with it."

According to co-chair Dr. Seed, a surge of water estimated at 24 feet (7 m), about 10 feet (3 m) higher than the height of the levees along the city's eastern flank, swept into New Orleans from the Gulf of Mexico, causing most of the flooding in the city. He said that storm surge from Lake Borgne traveling up the Intracoastal Waterway caused the breaches on the Industrial Canal.

In November 2005, the co-chairs revealed that "the floodwall at the 17th Street Canal was "destined to fail" long before it reached its maximum design load of 14 feet of water because the Army Corps of Engineers underestimated the weak soil layers 10 to 25 feet below the levee. That miscalculation was so obvious and fundamental, investigators said, they "could not fathom" how the design team of engineers from the corps, local firm Eustis Engineering, and the national firm Modjeski and Masters could have missed what is being termed the "costliest engineering mistake in American history."

In the final report, co-chair Dr. Bea said that the New Orleans–based design firm Modjeski and Masters could have followed correct procedures in calculating safety factors for the flood walls. He added, however, that design procedures of the Army Corps may not account for changes in soil strength caused by the changes in water flow and pressure during a hurricane flood. Dr. Bea also questioned the size of the design safety margins. He said the corps applied a 30% margin over the maximum design load. A doubling of strength would be a more typical margin for highway bridges, dams, off-shore oil platforms and other public structures. There were also indications that substandard concrete may have been used at the 17th Street Canal.

=== Team Louisiana (Louisiana DOTD) ===
A second major study was sponsored by the Louisiana Department of Transportation and Development, funded in part by the McKnight Foundation, led by Ivor van Heerden at Louisiana State University, and released in February 2007.

Using sonar, the forensic engineering team showed that at one point near the 17th Street Canal breach, the steel sheet pilings extend just 10 feet (3.0 m) below sea level, 7 feet (2.1 m) shallower than the Army Corps had maintained. "The Corps keeps saying the piles were 17 feet, but their own drawings show them to be 10 feet," Van Heerden said.

The primary mechanisms of failure at the 17th Street Canal, London Avenue Canal and also the Industrial Canal (east side north breach) were improper design of the canal floodwalls.

The report concluded: "The infrastructure failures observed in the New Orleans Area... were foreseeable, for the most part, and could have been prevented at a fraction of what it has cost to repair the current system."

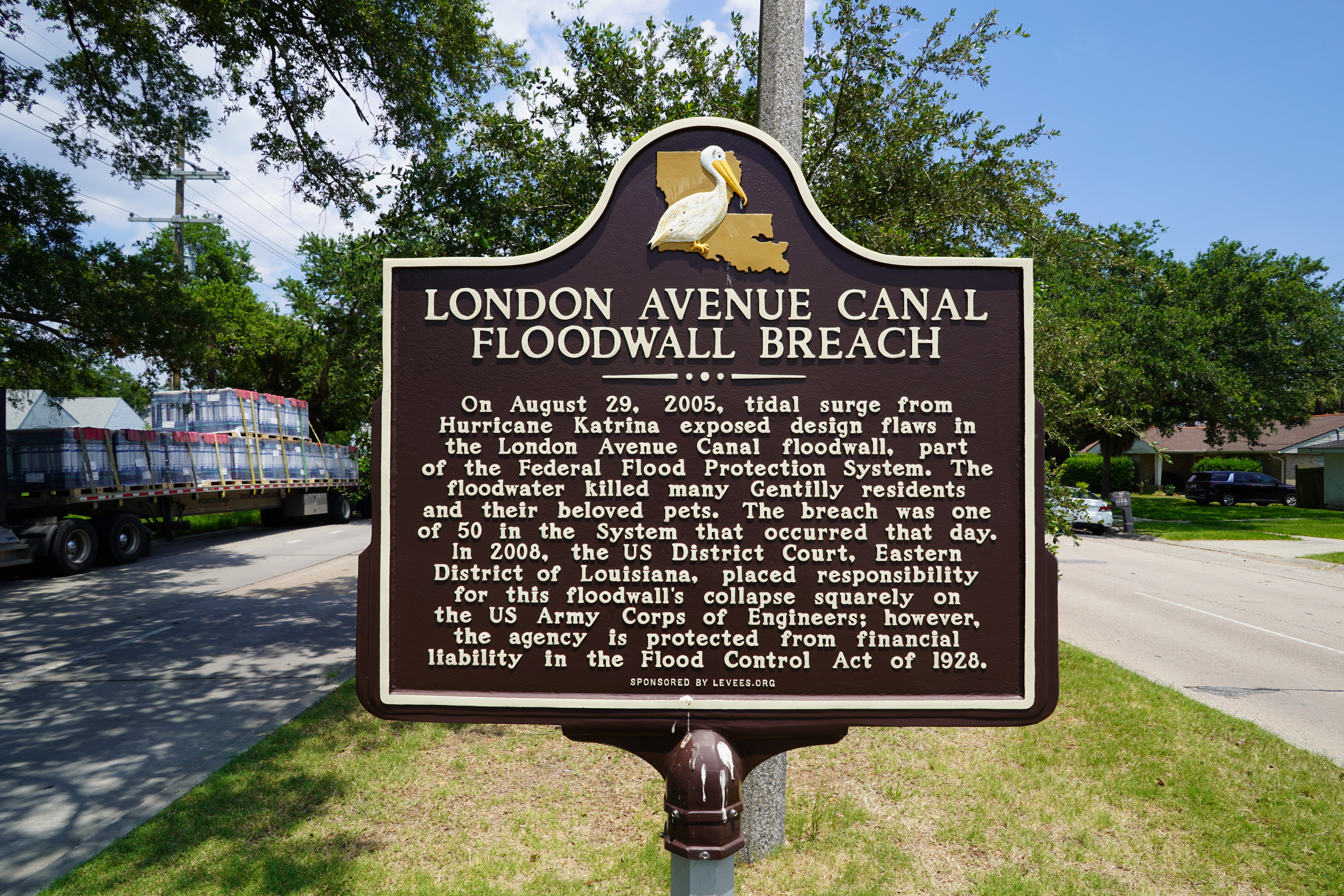

=== The New Orleans Hurricane Protection System: What Went Wrong and Why (ASCE External Review Panel) ===
From the report's executive summary: "The members of the American Society of Civil Engineers Hurricane Katrina External Review Panel have conducted an in-depth review of the comprehensive work of the United States Army Corps of Engineers (USACE) Interagency Performance Evaluation Task Force––at the USACE's request."

The final report, released in June 2007 concluded that the flooding from the 17th Street Canal and from the London Avenue Canal was due to two engineering oversights. The engineers responsible for the design of the canal levees––and the steel sheet pilings embedded in them called I-walls––overestimated the soil strength. This means that the soil strength used in the design calculations was greater than what actually existed under and near the levees. "The engineers made an unconservative (i.e., erring toward unsafe) interpretation of the data: the soil below the levee was actually weaker than that used in the I-wall design".

Another critical engineering oversight for both canals involves not taking into account the possibility of a water-filled gap which turned out to be a very important aspect of the failures of the I-walls. “Analysis indicate that, with the presence of a water-filled gap, the factor of safety is about 30 percent lower. Because a factor of safety of 1.3 was used for design, a reduction of 30 percent would reduce the factor of safety to approximately one: a condition of incipient failure.”

The primary failure mechanism for the east side south and west side breaches of the Industrial Canal was overtopping of levees and floodwalls by the storm surge. The primary failure mechanism for levees protecting New Orleans East was the existence of erodible materials like sand in 10% of places. The primary failure mechanism for the levees protecting St. Bernard Parish was overtopping of the Mississippi River-Gulf Outlet Canal, a navigation channel, built and maintained by the Army Corps that is now closed.

In April 2007, a spokesperson for the American Society of Civil Engineers termed the flooding of New Orleans as "the worst engineering catastrophe in US History.

=== Hurricane Protection Decision Chronology (Institute for Water Resources for the U.S. Army Corps of Engineers) ===
The Hurricane Protection Decision Chronology (HPDC) for the Lake Pontchartrain and Vicinity Hurricane Protection Project was prepared and written by Douglas Woolley and Leonard Shabman, both contractors with the Institute for Water Resources. It was published in March 2008.

Satellite photos of New Orleans taken in March 2004, then on August 31, 2005, after the levee failures.

From the Preface and Acknowledgements: The HPDC study charter was to document and examine decision-making for the Lake Pontchartrain & Vicinity Hurricane Protection Project (LP&VHPP). The HPDC study team was asked to assemble all available documents relevant to project planning, design, and implementation decisions made over the more than 50-year project history.

Pages 4-19, 4-23 and 4-25 of the report revealed that in 1980s the Army Corps misinterpreted the results of a study (E-99 Sheet Pile Wall Field Load Test) and wrongly concluded that when foundation soils were poor, sheet pile penetration depth beyond a certain point would not significantly increase I-wall stability in hurricane events. Therefore, the Army Corps determined that it needed to drive sheet piles down to depths of not more than 16 feet instead of between 31 and 46. Beyond that was determined to be a wasteful expenditure. Ultimately, in December 1987, the Division Headquarters issued new criteria guidance to the New Orleans District on sheet-piling design based on the E-99 tests. The phase-in of the new I-wall critieria was endorsed because of the "high potential for savings."

Page ES-17 of the report states that "there is no evidence in the project record indicating that project engineers believed that the decisions made would threaten engineering reliability."

=== National Academy of Sciences Investigation ===
On October 19, 2005, Defense Secretary Donald Rumsfeld announced that an independent panel of experts, under the direction of the National Academy of Sciences, would convene to evaluate the performance of the Lake Pontchartrain and Vicinity Hurricane Protection Project, and issue a final report in eight months. The panel would study the results provided by Interagency Performance Evaluation Task Force and also the associated ASCE External Peer Review Panel report.

The academy concluded that "the engineering of the levee system was not adequate. The procedures for designing and constructing hurricane protection systems will have to be improved, and the designing organizations must upgrade their engineering capabilities. The levees must be seen not as a system to protect real estate but as a set of dams to protect people. There must be independent peer reviews of future designs and construction." The final report was released in April 2009.

=== Interagency Performance Evaluation Taskforce ===
In early October, Lt. Gen. Carl Strock, the Chief of Engineers and the Commander of the Army Corps of Engineers commissioned the Interagency Performance Evaluation Task Force (IPET), made up of representatives from the Corps and other federal and state government agencies. "The IPET will evaluate the performance of hurricane protection systems in New Orleans and the surrounding areas".

The IPET consisted of independent and recognized experts from the Universities of Maryland, Florida, Notre Dame, and Virginia Polytechnic Institute, the National Oceanic and Atmospheric Administration, the South Florida Water Management District, Harris County Flood Control District (Houston, TX), the United States Department of Agriculture, and the United States Bureau of Reclamation as well as those from the Army Corps.

On June 1, 2006, the Army Corps issued their first draft report which stated that "the storm exceeded design criteria, but the performance was less than the design intent."

The IPET's final findings released in June 2009 indicated that,

With the exception of four I-wall design failures, all of the major breaches were caused by overtopping and subsequent erosion. Reduced protective elevations increased the amount of overtopping, erosion, and subsequent flooding, particularly in New Orleans East. The structures that ultimately breached performed as designed, providing protection until overtopping occurred and then becoming vulnerable to catastrophic breaching. The levee-floodwall designs for the 17th Street and London Avenue Outfall Canals and the northeast breach of the Industrial Canal were inadequate due to steel sheet-pilings driven to depths that were too shallow. In four cases the structures failed catastrophically prior to water reaching design elevations. A significant number of structures that were subjected to water levels beyond their design limits performed well.

In August 2007, the Corps released an analysis to determine the 17th Street Canal's safe water level for the 2007 hurricane season. It revealed that the floodwall's maximum safe load is only 7 feet (2.1 m) of water, which is half the original 14-foot (4.3 m) design.

The credibility of the IPET report was challenged in a 42-page letter to the American Society of Civil Engineers (ASCE) submitted by Dr. Raymond M. Seed, co-chair of the University of California, Berkeley (ILIT) study. Dr. Seed described an early, systematic intentional plan by the Army Corps of Engineers and the Department of Defense to hide the Army Corps' culpability relative to the LPVHPP, to limit, control and discredit the two independent investigations, to intimidate those who tried to intervene, to limit the scope of the official IPET investigation, and to delay releasing final results until the public’s attention turned elsewhere.

=== World Water Council ===
The most recent report was published in Water Policy the official journal of the World Water Council by J. David Rogers, G. Paul Kemp, H.J. Bosworth, Jr, and Raymond B. Seed. Drs. Rogers and Seed were two of the three co-chairs of the first post-Katrina ILIT investigation.

Lead author Dr. Rogers stated that the 2015 paper "was an effort set the historical record straight about how decisions were actually made prior to Hurricane Katrina." Dr. Rogers stated that his team "didn't have an adequate understanding of the politics behind decisions made by Congress" when he co-chaired the 2006 ILIT report.

The abstract for the article, published in March 2015, states:

"...What is evident from the project record is that the Army Corps of Engineers recommended raising the canal floodwalls for the 17th Street Canal, but recommended gated structures at the mouths of the Orleans and London Avenue Canals because the latter plan was less expensive. The OLB convinced Congress to pass legislation that required the Corps to raise the floodwalls for all three canals. Furthermore, the Corps, in a separate attempt to limit project costs, initiated a sheet pile load test (E-99 Study), but misinterpreted the results and wrongly concluded that sheet piles needed to be driven to depths of only 17 feet (1 foot ¼ 0.3048 meters) instead of between 31 and 46 feet. That decision saved approximately US$100 million, but significantly reduced overall engineering reliability..."

The article further addresses the E-99 Sheet Pile Wall Field Load Test. The authors concluded that a misinterpretation of the 1986 study regarding the depth of steel sheet pilings occurred apparently because the Army Corps had draped a tarpaulin over the gap that formed between the bases of the deflecting sheet piles and the soil in which they were embedded, so they did not see the gap. The tarpaulin was there for safety and to stop water that would seep through the interlocks. Failure to include the gap in interpretation of the test results introduced unconservatism in the final designs based on these tests. It allowed the use of shorter sheet piles, and reduced overall flood protection reliability.

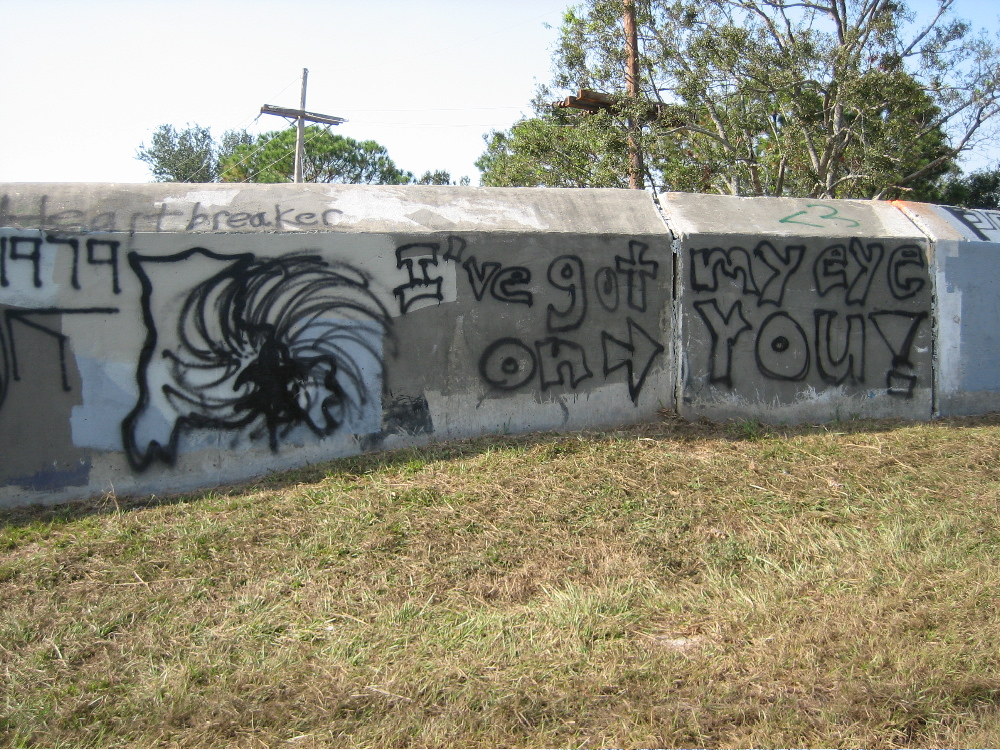
Portion of the flood wall atop 17th Street Canal levee, with Katrina-related graffiti. Notice cracks in the flood wall joints. Operation and maintenance are the responsibility of local levee districts as mandated by the Flood Control Act of 1965.

== Conspiracy theories ==
Nation of Islam leader Louis Farrakhan among other public figures claimed the levees were dynamited to divert waters away from wealthy white areas. The conspiracy theory reached a United States House of Representatives committee investigating Katrina when a New Orleans community activist made the claim. According to the New Orleans Times Picayune this is an "urban myth". Reasons for belief in these theories have been ascribed to 1) the decision by city officials during the Great Mississippi Flood of 1927 to set off 30 tons of dynamite on the levee at Caernarvon, Louisiana which eased pressure on levees at New Orleans. but flooded large parts of St. Bernard Parish and the east bank of Plaquemines Parish, 2) the fact that the Lower Ninth Ward took the brunt of the city's flooding during Hurricane Betsy, 3) the general disenfranchisement of blacks and lower-class people, and 4) the similarity of the sound of the Industrial Canal collapsing during Katrina to that of a bombing.

In the year prior to Katrina, homeowners along the 17th Street Canal, about 800 feet from the breach site, had reported their front yards flooding from persistent seepage from the canal to the New Orleans Sewerage and Water Board. James Taylor, chief spokesman for the Army Corps New Orleans District stated, "If we had received any information on that, we would have investigated that immediately."

== See also ==
- Flood Control Act of 1965
- 17th Street Canal
- Civil engineering and infrastructure repair in New Orleans after Hurricane Katrina
- Drainage in New Orleans
- Industrial Canal
- ING 4727
- Old River Control Structure
- The New Orleans Levee (newspaper)
- Seabrook Floodgate
- London Avenue Canal
- U.S. Army Corps of Engineers civil works controversies (New Orleans)
- Engineering failures in the U.S.
