= Engineering disasters =

Causes and list of disasters

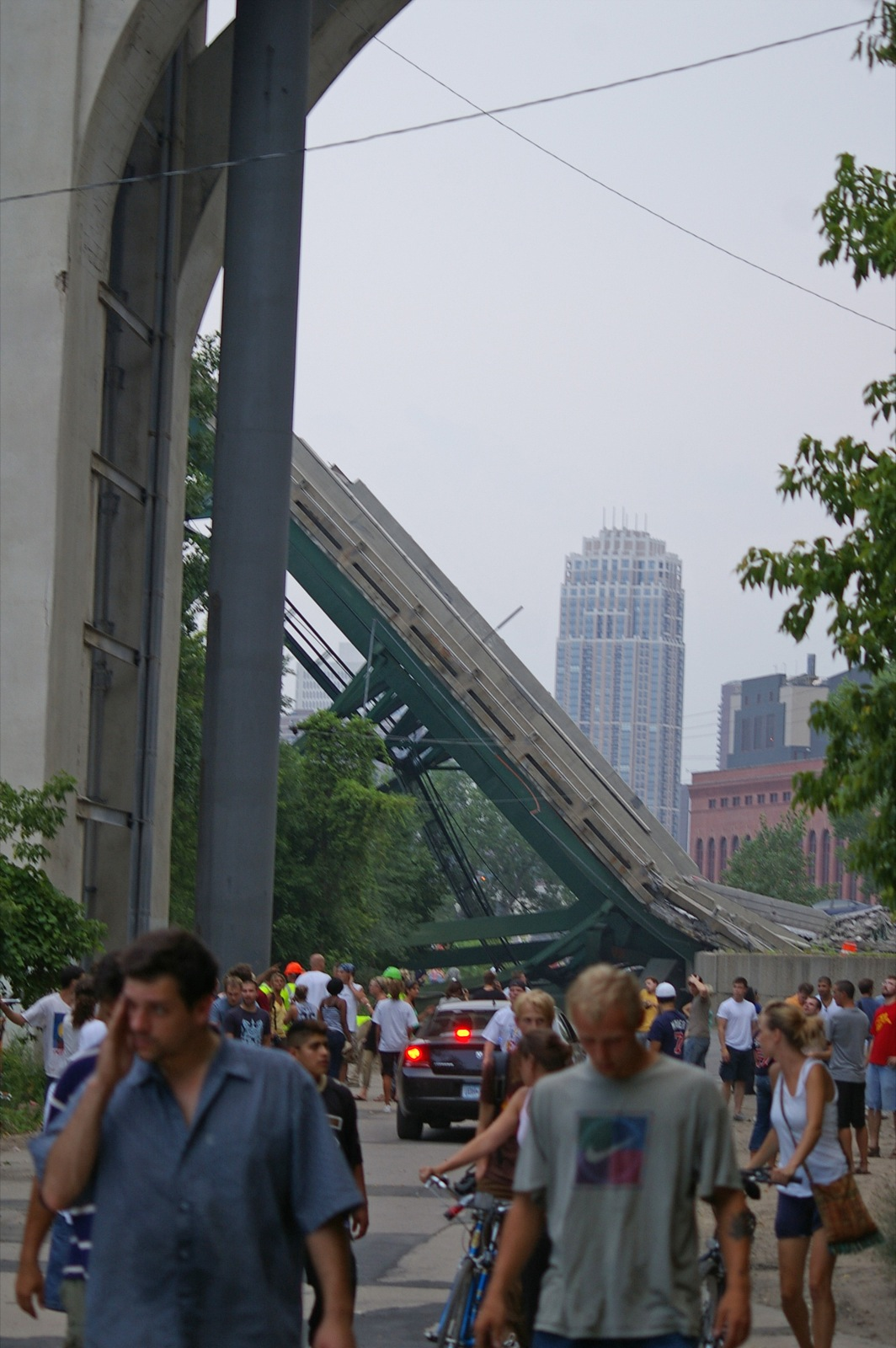
The I-35W Mississippi River bridge collapse in August 2007

Engineering disasters often arise from shortcuts or errors in the design process. Engineering is the science and technology used to meet the needs and demands of society. These demands include buildings, aircraft, vessels, and computer software. In order to meet society’s demands, the creation of newer technology and infrastructure must be met efficiently and cost-effectively. To accomplish this, managers and engineers need a mutual approach to the specified demand at hand. This can lead to shortcuts in engineering design to reduce costs of construction and fabrication. Occasionally, these shortcuts can lead to unexpected design failures. Engineering disasters are also caused by errors such as miscalculations and miscommunication.

== Overview ==
Failure occurs when a structure or device has been used past the limits of design that inhibits proper function. If a structure is designed to only support a certain amount of stress, strain, or loading and the user applies greater amounts, the structure will begin to deform and eventually fail. Several factors contribute to failure including a flawed design, improper use, financial costs, and miscommunication.

=== Safety ===
In the field of engineering, the importance of safety is emphasized. Learning from past engineering failures and infamous disasters such as the Challenger explosion brings the sense of reality to what can happen when appropriate safety precautions are not taken. Safety tests such as tensile testing, finite element analysis (FEA), and failure theories help provide information to design engineers about what maximum forces and stresses can be applied to a certain region of a design. These precautionary measures help prevent failures due to overloading and deformation.

=== Static loading ===
Stress–strain curve showing typical yield behavior for ductile metals. Stress (σ) is shown as a function of strain (ϵ). Stress and strain are correlated through Young's Modulus: σ=Eϵ where E is the slope of the linear section of the plot. The numbers indicate: 1: True elastic limit 2: Proportionality limit 3: Elastic limit 4: Offset yield strength, usually defined at e=0.2%

Static loading is when a force is applied slowly to an object or structure. Static load tests such as tensile testing, bending tests, and torsion tests help determine the maximum loads that a design can withstand without permanent deformation or failure. Tensile testing is common when calculating a stress-strain curve which can determine the yield strength and ultimate strength of a specific test specimen.

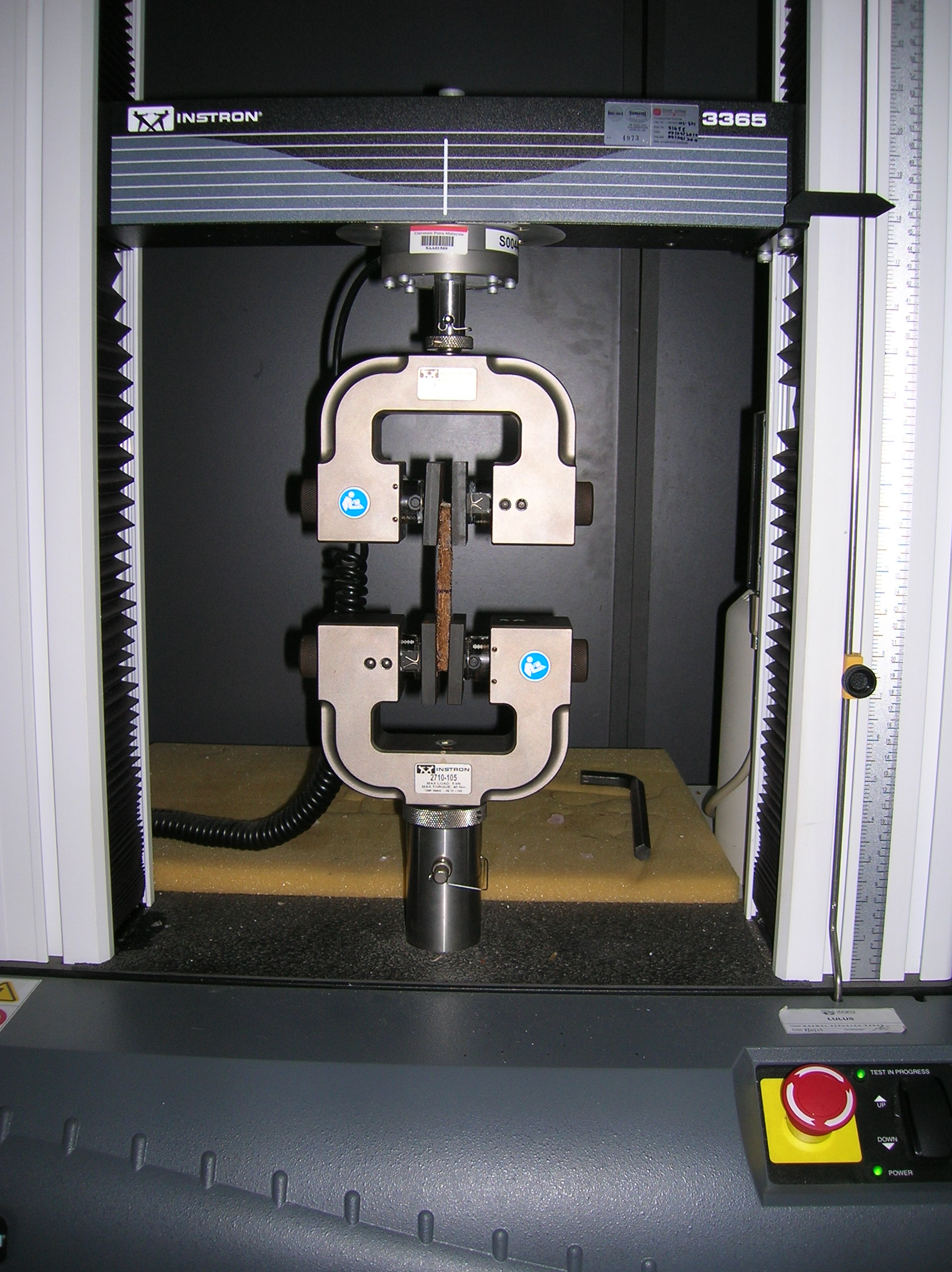
Tensile testing on a composite specimen

The specimen is stretched slowly in tension until it breaks, while the load and the distance across the gage length are continuously monitored. A sample subjected to a tensile test can typically withstand stresses higher than its yield stress without breaking. At a certain point, however, the sample will break into two pieces. This happens because the microscopic cracks that resulted from yielding will spread to large scales. The stress at the point of complete breakage is called a material's ultimate tensile strength. The result is a stress–strain curve of the material's behavior under static loading. Through this tensile testing, the yield strength is found at the point where the material begins to yield more readily to the applied stress, and its rate of deformation increases.

=== Fatigue ===
When a material undergoes permanent deformation from exposure to radical temperatures or constant loading, the functionality of the material can become impaired. This time–dependent plastic distortion of material is known as creep. Stress and temperature are both major factors of the rate of creep. In order for a design to be considered safe, the deformation due to creep must be much less than the strain at which failure occurs. Once the static loading causes the specimen to surpass this point, the specimen will begin permanent, or plastic, deformation.

In mechanical design, most failures are due to time-varying, or dynamic, loads that are applied to a system. This phenomenon is known as fatigue failure. Fatigue is known as the weakness in a material due to variations of stress that are repeatedly applied to said material. For example, when stretching a rubber band to a certain length without breaking it (i.e. not surpassing the yield stress of the rubber band) the rubber band will return to its original form after release; however, repeatedly stretching the rubber band with the same amount of force thousands of times would create micro-cracks in the band which would lead to the rubber band being snapped. The same principle is applied to mechanical materials such as metals.

Fatigue failure always begins at a crack that may form over time or due to the manufacturing process used. The three stages of fatigue failure are:

1. Crack initiation- when repeated stress creates a fracture in the material being used
2. Crack propagation- when the initiated crack develops in the material to a larger scale due to tensile stress.
3. Sudden fracture failure- caused by unstable crack growth to the point where the material will fail

Note that fatigue does not imply that the strength of the material is lessened after failure. This notion was originally referred to a material becoming "tired" after cyclic loading.

=== Miscommunication ===
Engineering is a precise discipline, requiring communication among project developers. Several forms of miscommunication can lead to a flawed design. Various fields of engineering must intercommunicate, including civil, electrical, mechanical, industrial, chemical, biological, and environmental engineering. For example, a modern automobile design requires electrical engineers, mechanical engineers, and environmental engineers to work together to produce a fuel-efficient, durable product for consumers. If engineers do not adequately communicate among one another, a potential design could have flaws and be unsafe for consumer purchase. Engineering disasters can be a result of such miscommunication, including the 2005 levee failures in Greater New Orleans, Louisiana during Hurricane Katrina, the Space Shuttle Columbia disaster, and the Hyatt Regency walkway collapse.

An exceptional example of this is the Mars Climate Orbiter. "The primary cause of the orbiter's violent demise was that one piece of ground software supplied by Lockheed Martin produced results in a United States customary unit, contrary to its Software Interface Specification (SIS), while a second system, supplied by NASA, expected those results to be in SI units, in accordance with the SIS." Lockheed Martin and the prime contractor spectacularly failed to communicate.

=== Software ===
Software has played a role in many high-profile disasters:

- Ariane flight V88
- Mars Climate Orbiter
- TAURUS — UK share settlement system and dematerialized central share depository
- Therac-25 — A radiation therapy machine responsible for six overdoses due to faulty software
- Failure at Dharan — Patriot Missile clock issue

=== Systems engineering ===
- Lion Air Flight 610 and Ethiopian Airlines Flight 302 — Faulty "MCAS" system on the Boeing 737 MAX

== Examples ==
Fatalities in engineering disaster, 1900-2023. Source: www.emdat.be

When larger projects such as infrastructures and airplanes fail, multiple people can be affected which leads to an engineering disaster. A disaster is defined as a calamity that results in significant damage which may include the loss of life. In-depth observations and post-disaster analysis have been documented to a large extent to help prevent similar disasters from occurring.

=== Infrastructure ===
==== Ashtabula River Bridge Disaster (1876) ====
The Ashtabula River railroad disaster occurred December 29, 1876 when a bridge over the Ashtabula River near Ashtabula, Ohio failed as a Lake Shore and Michigan Southern Railway train passed over it, killing at least 92 people. Modern analyses blame failure of an angle block lug, thrust stress and low temperatures.

==== Tay Bridge Disaster (1879) ====
On December 28, 1879, the Tay Bridge Disaster occurred when the first Tay Rail Bridge collapsed as a North British Railway passenger train on the Edinburgh–Dundee line passed over it, killing at least 59 people. The major cause was failure to allow for wind loadings.

==== Johnstown Flood (1889) ====
The Johnstown Flood occurred on May 31, 1889, when the South Fork Dam located on the Little Conemaugh River upstream of the town of Johnstown, Pennsylvania, failed after days of heavy rainfall killing at least 2,209 people. A 2016 hydraulic analysis confirmed that changes made to the dam severely reduced its ability to withstand major storms.

==== Quebec Bridge collapse (1907) ====
The road, rail and pedestrian Quebec Bridge in Quebec, Canada, failed twice during construction, in 1907 and 1916, at the cost of 88 lives. The first failure was improper design of the chords. The second failure occurred when the central span was being raised into position and fell into the river.

==== St. Francis Dam collapse (1928) ====
The St. Francis Dam was a concrete gravity dam located in San Francisquito Canyon in Los Angeles County, California, built from 1924 to 1926 to serve Los Angeles's growing water needs. It failed in 1928 due to a defective soil foundation and design flaws, triggering a flood that claimed the lives of at least 431 people.

==== Tacoma Narrows Bridge collapse (1940) ====
Footage of the old Tacoma Narrows Bridge collapsing (19.1 MB video, 02:30).

The first Tacoma Narrows Bridge was a suspension bridge in Washington that spanned the Tacoma Narrows strait of Puget Sound. It dramatically collapsed on November 7, 1940. The proximate cause was moderate winds which produced aeroelastic flutter that was self-exciting and unbounded, opposite to damping.

==== Hyatt Regency Hotel walkway collapse (1981) ====
On July 17, 1981, two overhead walkways loaded with partygoers at the Hyatt Regency Hotel in Kansas City, Missouri, collapsed. The concrete and glass platforms fell onto a tea dance in the lobby, killing 114 and injuring 216. Investigations concluded the walkway would have failed under one-third the weight it held that night because of a revised design.

==== Federal levee failures in New Orleans (2005) ====
Levees and floodwalls protecting New Orleans, Louisiana, and its suburbs failed in 50 locations on August 29, 2005, following the passage of Hurricane Katrina, killing 1,577 people. Four major investigations all concurred that the primary cause of the flooding was inadequate design and construction by the Army Corps of Engineers.

==== Ponte Morandi collapse (2018) ====
Ponte Morandi was a road viaduct in Genoa, Liguria, Italy. On August 14, 2018, a section of the viaduct collapsed during a rainstorm, killing forty-three people. The remains of the original bridge were demolished in August 2019.

==== Surfside condominium building collapse (2021) ====
On June 24, 2021, at 1:22 a.m., Champlain Towers South, a 12-story beachfront condominium in the Miami suburb of Surfside, Florida, partially collapsed killing ninety-eight people. The investigations are currently ongoing.

=== Aeronautics ===
==== Space Shuttle Challenger disaster (1986) ====
The Space Shuttle Challenger disaster occurred on January 28, 1986, when the NASA Space Shuttle orbiter Challenger (OV-099) (mission STS-51-L) broke apart 73 seconds into its flight, leading to the deaths of its seven crew members. Disintegration of the vehicle began after an O-ring seal in its right solid rocket booster (SRB) failed at liftoff.

==== Space Shuttle Columbia disaster (2003) ====
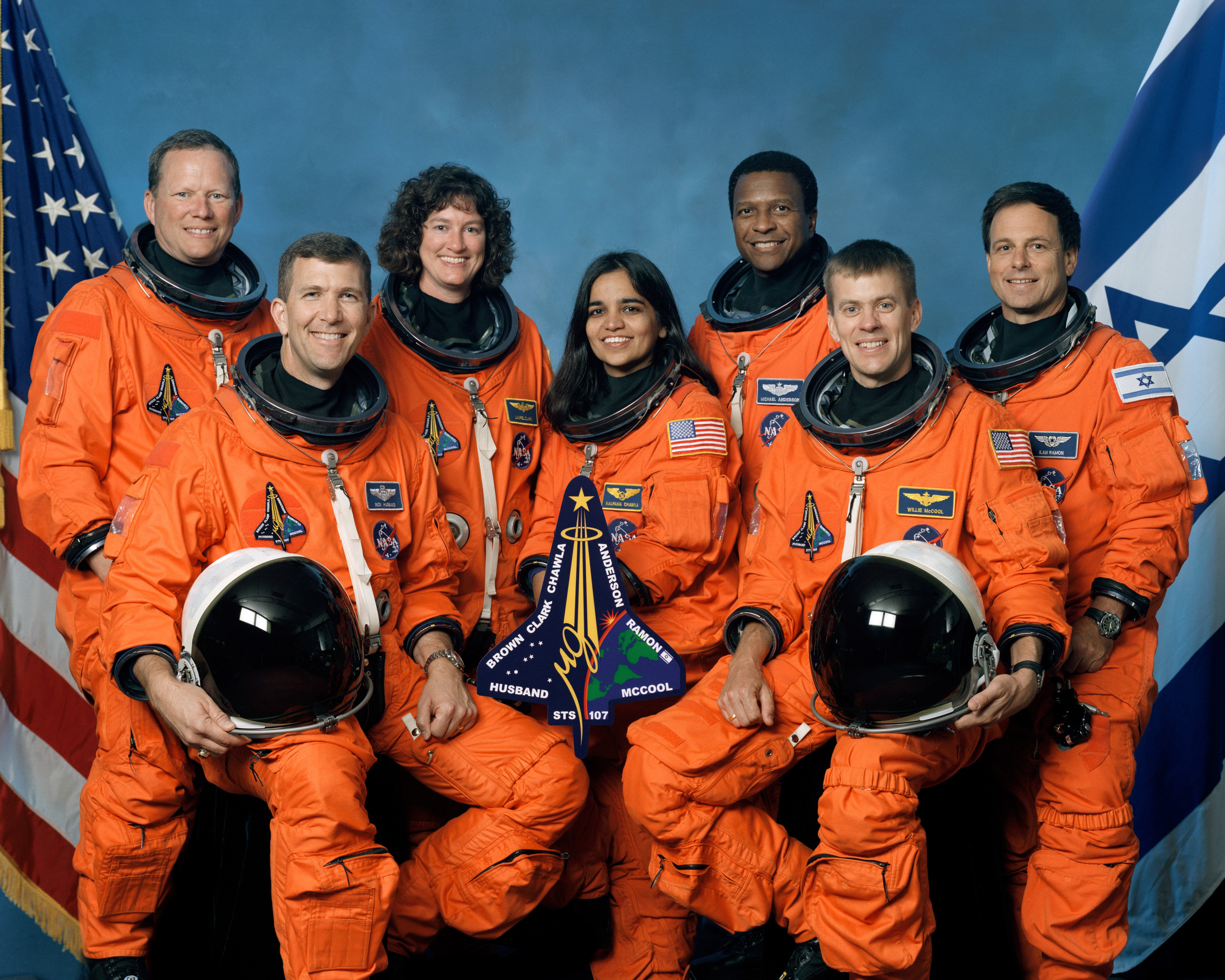
The crew of the STS-107 mission

The Space Shuttle Columbia (OV-102) disaster occurred on February 1, 2003, during the final leg of STS-107. While re-entering Earth's atmosphere over Louisiana and Texas, the shuttle unexpectedly disintegrated, resulting in the deaths of all seven astronauts on board. The cause was damage to thermal shielding tiles from impact with a falling piece of foam insulation from an external tank during the January 16 launch.

=== Vessels ===
==== Liberty ships in WWII ====
Early Liberty ships suffered hull and deck cracks, and a few were lost to such structural defects. During World War II, there were nearly 1,500 instances of significant brittle fractures. Three of the 2,710 Liberties built broke in half without warning. In cold temperatures the steel hulls cracked, resulting in later ships being constructed using more suitable steel.

==== Steamboat Sultana (1865) ====
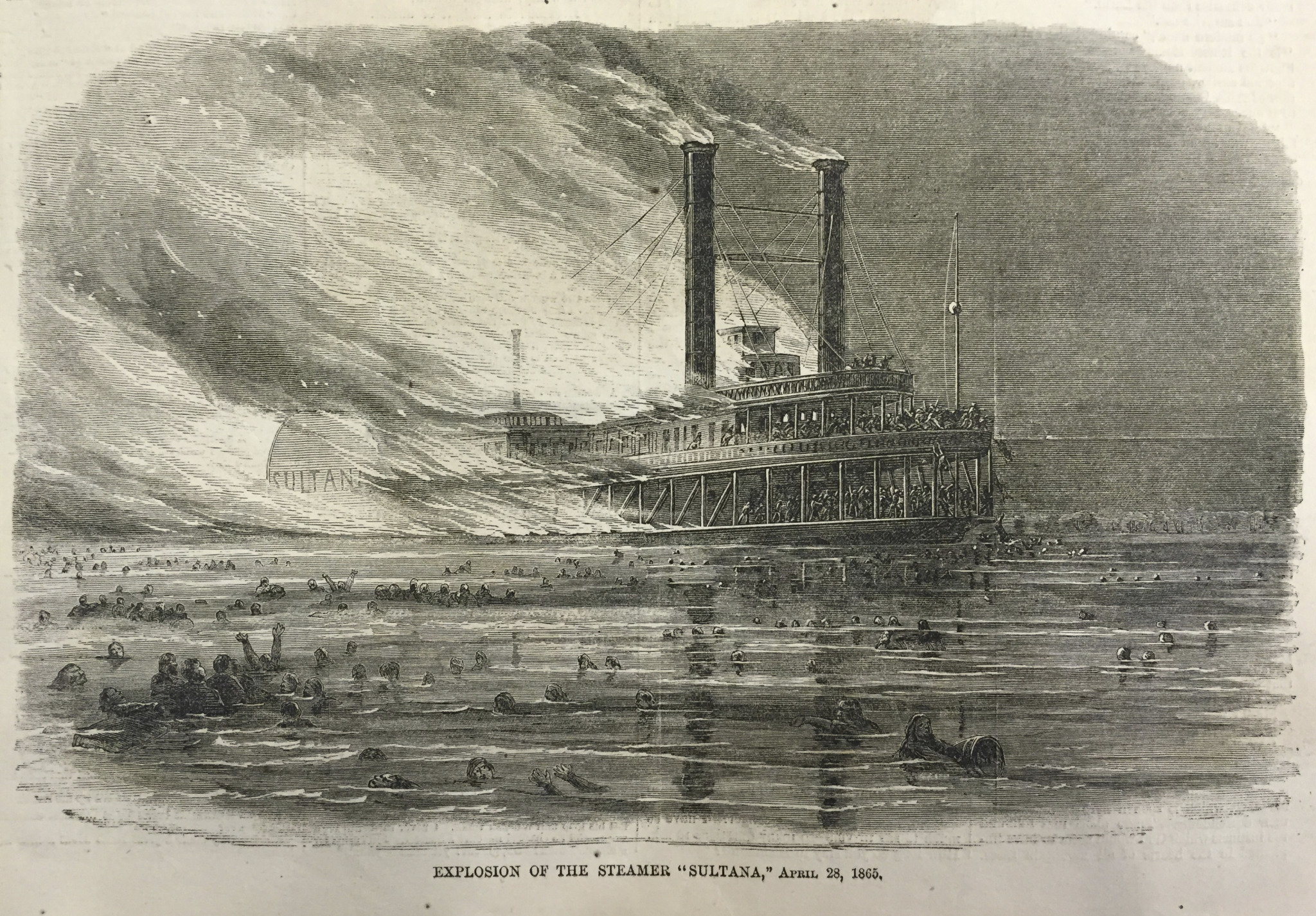
Depiction of the steamboat Sultana disaster

On the night of April 26, 1865, the passenger steamboat Sultana exploded on the Mississippi River seven miles (11 km) north of Memphis, Tennessee. The explosion resulted in the loss of 1,547 lives. The cause was believed to be the result of an incorrectly repaired boiler exploding, which led to the explosion of two of the three other boilers.

==== Titan submersible ====
On 18 June 2023, the submersible Titan imploded during an expedition to the wreck of the Titanic, killing all five persons on board. Flaws in the design of the submersible and the carbon fibre pressure hull in particular were discussed as a possible cause of the implosion, with Titan's operator OceanGate having ignored multiple previous warnings about the potential for accidents.

== See also ==
- Lists of disasters
- List of engineering blunders
- Normalization of deviance
- Nuclear and radiation accidents and incidents
- Structural integrity and failure
- Engineering Failures in the U.S.
