= Engineering failures in the U.S. =

List of major engineering and design failures

Engineering failures in the United States can be costly, disruptive, and deadly, with the largest incidents prompting changes to engineering practice. Failures can be attributed to flawed design, improper use, cost, or miscommunication as noted in Engineering Disasters.

== Examples ==
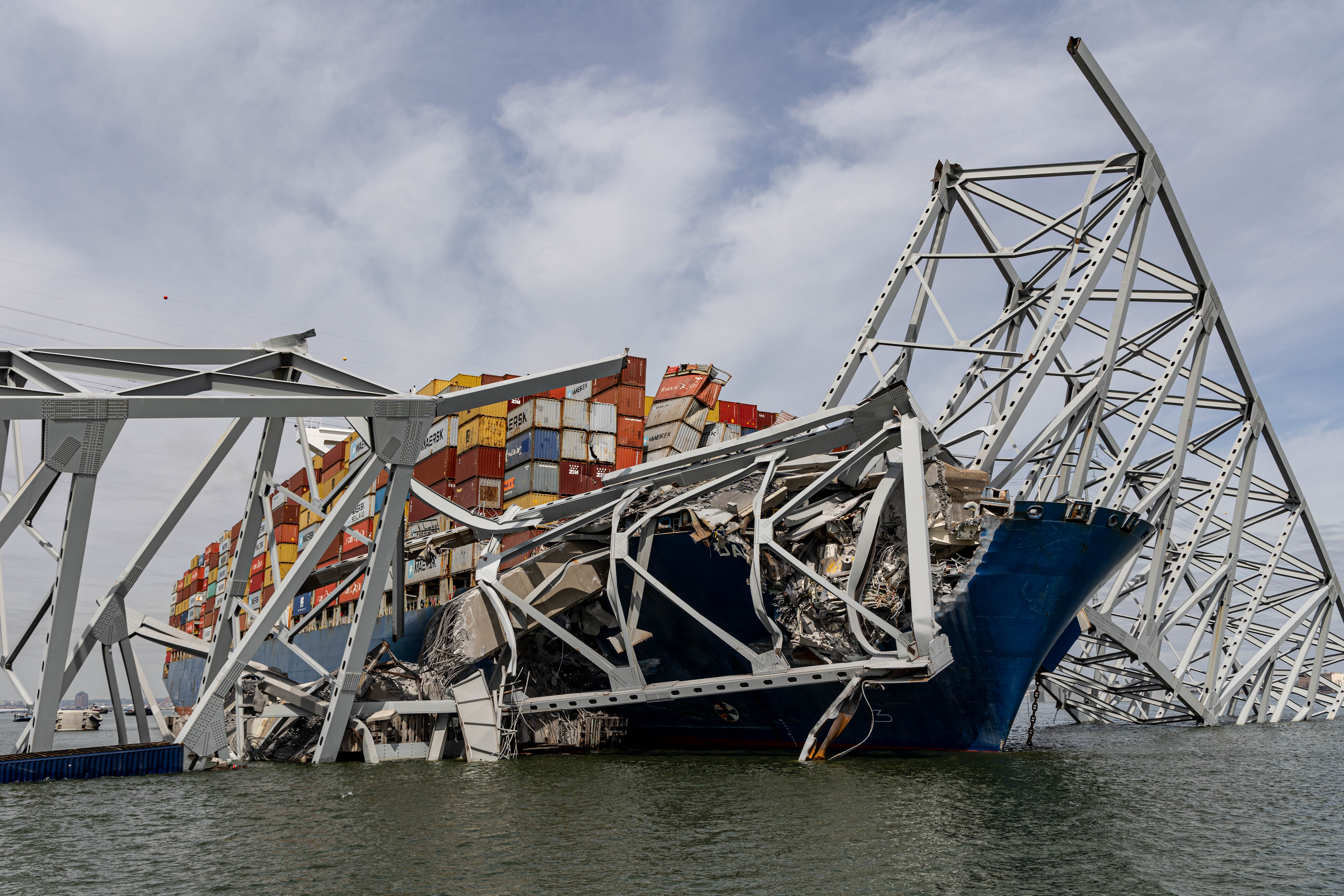
NTSB drone image of Francis Scott Key Bridge and Cargo Ship Dali

=== Infrastructure ===
==== Francis Scott Key bridge collapse (2024) ====
The Francis Scott Key Bridge (informally, Key Bridge or Beltway Bridge) collapsed on March 26, 2024 at 1:28 a.m., after a container ship struck one of its piers. Six members of a maintenance crew were killed. The NTSB has not yet released its final report on the cause of the collapse.

==== Hubert H. Humphrey Metrodome collapse (2010) ====
At about 5 a.m. Sunday morning, the roof of Minneapolis's Hubert H. Humphrey Metrodome tore under the weight of 17 inches of snow. The Metrodome has a roof of fiberglass fabric that's inflated by the stadium's air pressure, but a weekend blizzard was the trigger to cause the roof to sag and tear, dumping a large volume of snow all over the field. No one was injured.

==== I-35W Mississippi River bridge collapse (2007) ====
On August 1, 2007, at 6:05 p.m., the central span of the bridge gave way, sending the occupants of 111 vehicles to the river or its banks killing 13 and injuring 145. The NTSB cited a design flaw as the likely cause of the collapse, noting that an excessively thin gusset plate ripped along a line of rivets.

==== Levee failures in New Orleans (2005) ====
Levees and floodwalls protecting New Orleans, Louisiana, and its suburbs failed in 50 locations on August 29, 2005, following the passage of Hurricane Katrina, killing 1,392 people. Major investigations all concurred that the primary cause of the flooding was inadequate design and construction of the flood protection by the U.S. Army Corps of Engineers.

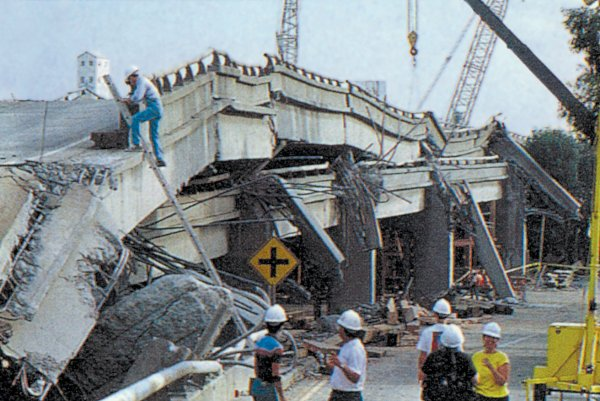
The collapsed Cypress Street Viaduct at the Northern end, near the corner of Cypress and 32nd Streets

==== Cypress Freeway collapse (1989) ====
During the 1989 Loma Prieta earthquake in Oakland, California, the collapse of the upper tier of the Oakland, CA highway onto the lower tier caused 42 of the 63 total fatalities. The design was unable to survive the earthquake because the upper portions of the exterior columns were not tied by reinforcing to the lower columns, and the concrete columns were not sufficiently reinforced with steel ties to prevent bursting.

==== Hyatt Regency Hotel walkway collapse (1981) ====
On July 17, 1981, two overhead walkways loaded with partygoers at the Hyatt Regency Hotel in Kansas City, Missouri, collapsed. The concrete and glass platforms fell onto a tea dance in the lobby, killing 114 and injuring 216. Investigations concluded the walkway would have failed under one-third the weight it held that night because of an inadequate support connection derived from a revised detail.

==== Sunshine Skyway Bridge collapse (1980) ====
On the morning of May 9, 1980, the freighter MV Summit Venture collided with a support pier near the center of the bridge during a sudden storm, resulting in the catastrophic failure of the southbound roadway and the deaths of 35 people when several vehicles, including a Greyhound bus, plunged into Tampa Bay.

Tacoma Narrows Bridge destruction

==== Tacoma Narrows Bridge collapse (1940) ====
The first Tacoma Narrows Bridge was a suspension bridge in Washington that spanned the Tacoma Narrows strait of Puget Sound. It dramatically collapsed on November 7, 1940. The proximate cause was moderate winds which produced aeroelastic flutter that was self-exciting and unbounded. For any constant sustained wind speed above about 35 mph, the amplitude of the (torsional) flutter oscillation would continuously increase.

==== New London School natural gas explosion (1937) ====
The New London School explosion occurred on March 18, 1937, when a natural gas leak caused an explosion and destroyed the London School in New London, Texas, United States killing more than 300 students and teachers. Experts from the United States Bureau of Mines concluded that the connection to the cheap 'residue gas' line was faulty and allowed odorless and colorless gas to leak into the school, and because there was no odor, the leak was unnoticed for quite some time.

==== St. Francis Dam collapse (1928) ====
The St. Francis Dam was a concrete gravity dam located in San Francisquito Canyon in Los Angeles County, California, built from 1924 to 1926 to serve Los Angeles's growing water needs. It failed in 1928 due to a defective foundation design, triggering a flood that claimed the lives of at least 431 people.

==== Knickerbocker Theatre roof collapse (1922) ====
The theater's roof collapsed on January 28, 1922, under the weight of snow from a two-day blizzard that was later dubbed the Knickerbocker storm and killed 98 patrons and injured 133. The investigations concluded that the collapse was most likely the result of poor design, blaming the failure on the support for one of the arch girders that supported the roof, which had shifted, allowing the girder to slip off of one of the support pillars.

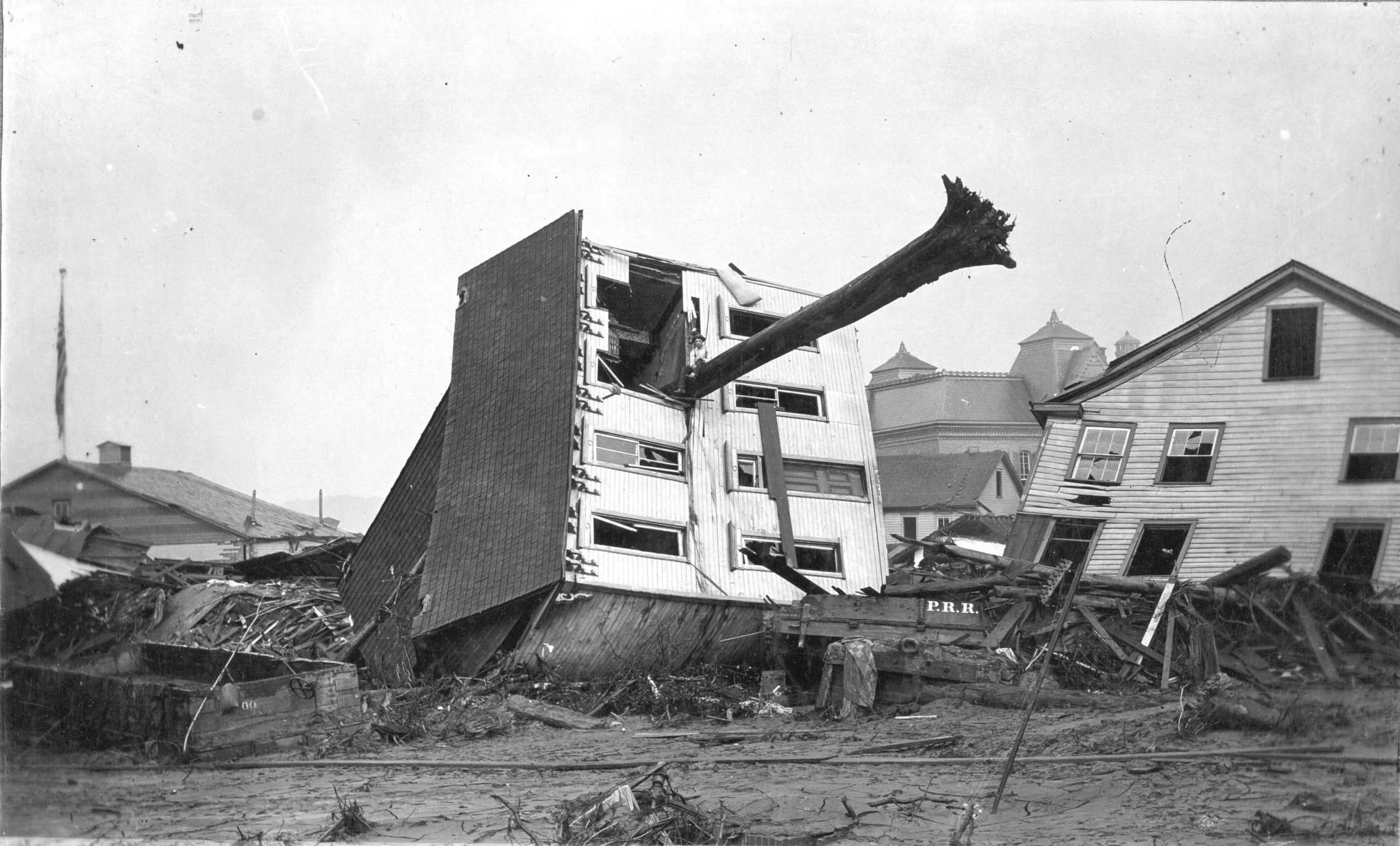
Tree in House in the aftermath of the Johnstown Flood

==== South Fork Dam rupture (1889) ====
The Johnstown Flood occurred on May 31, 1889, when the South Fork Dam located on the Little Conemaugh River upstream of the town of Johnstown, Pennsylvania, failed after days of heavy rainfall killing at least 2,209 people. A 2016 hydraulic analysis confirmed that changes made to the dam severely reduced its ability to withstand major storms.

==== Ashtabula River Bridge collapse (1876) ====
The Ashtabula River railroad disaster occurred December 29, 1876 when a bridge over the Ashtabula River near Ashtabula, Ohio failed as a Lake Shore and Michigan Southern Railway train passed over it killing at least 92 people. Modern analyses blame failure of an angle block lug, thrust stress and low temperatures.

==== Pemberton Mill building collapse (1860) ====
On January 10, 1860, at around 4:30 PM, a section of the Pemberton Mill textiles factory building suddenly collapsed, trapping several hundred workers underneath the rubble and killing up to 145 workers. Investigators attributed the disaster to substandard construction that was then drastically overloaded with second-floor equipment.

=== Aeronautics ===
==== Space Shuttle Columbia explosion (2003) ====
The Space Shuttle Columbia disaster occurred on February 1, 2003, during the final leg of the 113th flight of the Space Shuttle program. While reentering Earth's atmosphere over Louisiana and Texas the shuttle unexpectedly disintegrated, resulting in the deaths of all seven astronauts on board. The cause was damage to thermal shielding tiles from impact with a falling piece of foam insulation from an external tank during the January 16 launch.

==== Space Shuttle Challenger explosion (1986) ====
The Space Shuttle Challenger disaster occurred on January 28, 1986, when the NASA Space Shuttle orbiter Challenger broke apart 73 seconds into its flight, leading to the deaths of its seven crew members. Disintegration of the vehicle began after an O-ring seal in its right solid rocket booster (SRB) failed at liftoff.

Apollo 13 Houston, We've Got a Problem

==== Apollo 13 (1970) ====
Apollo 13 was the seventh crewed mission in the Apollo space program and the third meant to land on the Moon. The craft was launched from Kennedy Space Center on April 11, 1970, but the lunar landing was aborted after an oxygen tank in the service module (SM) ruptured two days into the mission, disabling its electrical and life-support system. The crew, supported by backup systems on the lunar module (LM), instead looped around the Moon in a circumlunar trajectory and returned safely to Earth on April 17.

== See also ==
- Engineering disasters
- Industrial disasters
- List of maritime disasters
- List of spaceflight-related accidents and incidents
- List of building and structure collapses
- Nuclear and radiation accidents and incidents
- Structural integrity and failure
