= Standard Project Hurricane =

Model used to determine hurricane protection system

The Standard Project Hurricane, or SPH, was the initial model used to determine how strong the hurricane protection system should be in order to protect the New Orleans, Louisiana area from flooding due to hurricanes.

== History ==
The U.S. Army Corps of Engineers began developing the model with the Weather Bureau in 1959.

The standard was developed before the Saffir-Simpson hurricane scale came into use, and the features of the Standard Project fit poorly with the scale. The wind speed for the project hurricane was just 100 miles per hour, which falls into Category 2; other features more closely resemble a much more severe Category 4. The United States Army Corps of Engineers generally calls it the equivalent of a fast-moving Category 3.

The standard project hurricane became "enshrined within the corps," according to an investigation of the levee failures in New Orleans following Hurricane Katrina, who noted that "the corps saw little need to go back and reanalyze "the true risks of catastrophic flooding" in New Orleans. Even when the National Oceanic and Atmospheric Administration, the successor agency to the Weather Bureau, recommended increasing the strength of the model, the corps did not change its construction plans."

== Shortcomings ==
Dr. David Daniel, the chairman of a panel reviewing the corps' investigation, said in an interview, "It was not a terribly sophisticated or detailed analysis by today's standards."

The creators of the standard project hurricane, in an attempt to find a representative storm, actually excluded the fiercest storms from the database.

"Storms like Hurricane Camille in 1969 were taken out of the data set as lying too far out of the norm; the Berkeley researchers noted that 'excluding outlier data is not appropriate in the context of dealing with extreme hazards.' Also, the calculations of the cost-benefit ratio did not take into account the costs of failure, both economic and social, far greater in an urban area like New Orleans than a rural one."

== See also ==
- Flood Control Act of 1965
- U.S. Army Corps of Engineers civil works controversies
- U.S. Army Corps of Engineers civil works controversies (New Orleans)
- 2005 levee failures in Greater New Orleans
- When the Levees Broke (film)
- London Avenue Canal
- 17th Street Canal
- Industrial Canal
- Reconstruction of New Orleans
- Civil engineering and infrastructure repair in New Orleans after Hurricane Katrina
- Criticism of the government response to Hurricane Katrina
- Political effects of Hurricane Katrina
- Levees.org - Non profit in New Orleans holding the Army Corps accountable for their flood protection nationwide
