= Rivers and Harbors Act of 1965 =

United States federal law

The Rivers and Harbors Act of 1965, Title III of Pub. L. 89–298, was enacted October 27, 1965, by the 89th United States Congress. The act authorized the U.S. Army Corps of Engineers to design and construct numerous navigation and beach erosion projects.

The Flood Control Act of 1965 was also part of Pub. L. 89–298 (Title II).

== Navigation ==
Sec 305 of the Act authorized 46 navigation projects in Massachusetts, New York, New Jersey, Rhode Island, Washington DC, Virginia, North Carolina, Georgia, Florida, Alabama, Louisiana, Michigan, Ohio, Indiana, Texas, California, Oregon, Washington, and Hawaii.

== Beach erosion ==
The Act authorized 9 beach erosion projects in Rhode Island, New Jersey, South Carolina, Florida, Illinois, and Hawaii.

== Surveys ==
The Act authorized surveys of 19 rivers and bodies of water, including the Great Lakes, Saint Lawrence Seaway and the Gulf Intracoastal Waterway.

== Chesapeake Bay ==
The Act authorized a complete investigation by the Corps of Engineers of the Chesapeake Bay basin in all aspects, to include navigation, fisheries, flood control, aquatic plants, water quality, water supply, beach erosion, and recreation.

== Modification of other acts ==
- Modified the Rivers and Harbors Act of 1958 to include a comprehensive program for eradication of noxious aquatic plants.
- Changed dates or funding amounts in the Rivers and Harbors Act of 1948, the Rivers and Harbors Act of 1960, and the Rivers and Harbors Act of 1962.
- Substantially changed Sec 111 of the Rivers and Harbors Act of 1958 dealing with protection, alteration, relocation, reconstruction, or replacement of existing navigation projects as determined by the Chief of Engineers.

== See also ==
- Clean Water Act
- Rivers and Harbors Act
- Flood Control Act

each of which deal with water resource issues.
