= Flood Control Act of 1965 =

US federal law

The Flood Control Act of 1965, Title II of Pub. L. 89–298, was enacted on October 27, 1965, by the 89th Congress and authorized the United States Army Corps of Engineers to design and construct numerous flood control projects including the Lake Pontchartrain and Vicinity, Louisiana Hurricane Protection Project in the New Orleans region of south Louisiana.

The Rivers and Harbors Act of 1965 was also part of Pub. L. 89–298 (Title III).

== Basic provisions ==
Sec 201 of the Act authorized the Secretary of the Army, acting through the Chief of Engineers (of the U.S. Army Corps of Engineers) to design and construct any water resource development project, including navigation, flood control, and shore protection if the cost of any single project did not exceed $10 million. Any such project was subject to local cost sharing in the same manner as larger projects.

== Surveys ==
Sec 208 of the Act authorized the Corps of Engineers to conduct surveys for flood control and allied purposes, to include drainage and channel improvements.

== Lake Pontchartrain and Vicinity Hurricane Protection Project ==
Prior to 1965, the pre-Hurricane Katrina Orleans Levee District (OLD), governed by the Orleans Levee Board (OLB), owned considerable assets, mainly real estate, a peculiarity that stems from its history. In the early 20th century, the OLD designed, built and maintained New Orleans’s drainage and hurricane protection levees and floodwalls. The OLD also reclaimed a portion of Lake Pontchartrain (a 24-mile wide lake north of New Orleans), developed the land and sold it to raise money to build and improve levees. The Lake Vista, Lake Oaks, Lake Terrace, East and West Lakeshore subdivisions and other property between Robert E. Lee Blvd and Lake Pontchartrain are all examples of these developed properties. The OLD also owned a marina and a small commercial airport on a man-made peninsula created from dredged material in the early 1930s.

In the Flood Control Act of 1965––legislation enacted in response to losses exceeding $1 billion (including multiple levee failures) during Hurricane Betsy––Congress directed the Army Corps, from then forward, to be responsible for the design and construction of the hurricane flood protection system encircling New Orleans. It was called the Lake Pontchartrain and Vicinity Hurricane Protection Project. The OLD retained the role of maintenance and operations once the projects were complete.

Congress directed the Army Corps to build a flood protection system to protect Greater New Orleans from the worst storms characteristic of the region. The Army Corps began developing the storm model in 1959, called the Standard Project Hurricane (SPH). This model was not subsequently adjusted, despite the National Oceanic and Atmospheric Administration (the successor agency to the Weather Bureau) recommending increasing the strength of the model: the Corps did not change its construction plans. The initial scope of the project was to provide hurricane protection to areas around the lake in the parishes of Orleans, Jefferson, St. Bernard, and St. Charles with the federal government paying 70 percent of the costs and the state and local interests paying 30 percent, the typical cost-share arrangement. The proposal the Army Corps put forward was for a 200-year flood level of flood protection; the parishes' levee boards, however, only wanted protection against a 100-year flood because it was cheaper to build, which influenced the final project design. When Katrina struck in 2005, the project was between 60-90% complete and the projected date of completion was estimated to be 2015.

Details of the congressional mandate are defined in the Government Accountability Office's testimony before the Senate Committee on Environment and Public Works on September 28, 2005. The opening paragraph of the twelve page report reads:

"Congress first authorized the Lake Pontchartrain and Vicinity, Louisiana Hurricane Protection Project in the Flood Control Act of 1965. The project was to construct a series of control structures, concrete floodwalls, and levees to provide hurricane protection to areas around Lake Pontchartrain. The project, when designed, was expected to take about 13 years to complete and cost about $85 million."

After Hurricane Katrina, seven major investigations were conducted by civil engineers and other experts in an attempt to identify the underlying reasons for the failure of the federal flood protection system. All concurred that the primary cause of the flooding was inadequate design and construction by the Army Corps of Engineers.

On January 4, 2023, the National Hurricane Center (NHC) updated the Katrina fatality data based on Rappaport (2014). The new toll reduced the number by about one quarter from an estimated 1,833 to 1,392. The Rappaport analysis wrote that the 2005 storm “…stands apart not just for the enormity of the losses, but for the ways in which most of the deaths occurred.” The same NHC report also revised the total damage estimate keeping Hurricane Katrina as the costliest storm ever––$190 billion according to NOAA’s National Centers for Environmental Information.

In September 2022, the Associated Press issued a style guide change to Katrina stating that reporters when writing about the storm in New Orleans should note that “…levee failures played a major role in the devastation in New Orleans. In some stories, that can be as simple as including a phrase about Hurricane Katrina’s catastrophic levee failures and flooding….”

== Specific projects ==
Sec 204 of the Act authorized projects in the following locations:

- St John River Basin, Maine
- Housatonic River Basin, Connecticut
- New England - Atlantic Coastal Area
- Long Island Sound
- New York - Atlantic Coastal Area
- Elizabeth River Basin, New Jersey
- Rahway River Basin, New Jersey
- Neuse River Basin, North Carolina
- Middle Atlantic Coastal Area
- Flint River Basin, Georgia
- Central and Southern Florida Basin
- South Atlantic Coastal Area
- Phillippi Creek Basin, Florida
- Lower Mississippi River Basin, adapting the Birds Point - New Madrid project enacted by 45 Stat. 34 at an estimated cost of $189,109,000
- General Projects - Grand Isle, Morgan City, and Lake Pontchartrain, Louisiana (Lake Pontchartrain at a cost of $56,235,000)
- Ouachita River Basin, Louisiana
- Red River Basin, Arkansas, Louisiana, and Texas
- Gulf of Mexico - various bayous in Texas
- Rio Grande Basin, Texas at a cost of $12,493,000
- Arkansas River Basin, as authorized by the Rivers and Harbors Act of 1946 - various creeks and rivers in Colorado, Arkansas, Oklahoma, and Kansas
- Missouri River Basin - various creeks and rivers in Kansas, Iowa, South Dakota, North Dakota, Missouri, and Montana
- Ohio River Basin - various creeks and rivers in Ohio, Pennsylvania, Indiana, Illinois, Kentucky, Virginia, West Virginia
- Red River of the North Basin
- Upper Mississippi River Basin - various projects in Iowa, Illinois, Missouri, Minnesota and South Dakota
- Great Lakes Basin
- Little Colorado River Basin
- Gila River Basin, Arizona
- Eel River, Whitewater River, Santa Ana River, Sacramento River, San Diego River Basins, California
- San Francisco Bay Area
- Columbia River Basin, Oregon and Washington

Sec 201 of the Act authorized:

- Kahoma Stream Flood Control Project, Hawaii at a cost of $18,500,000

== San Francisco Bay water quality ==
Sec 216 of the Act authorized the Corps of Engineers to study the water and wastewater quality of various bodies of water in the San Francisco Bay area.

== Modification of other Flood Control Acts ==
- Flood Control Act of 1944, with respect to roads impacted by Whitney Dam, Texas
- Flood Control Act of 1958, with respect to the Minnesota River
- Flood Control Act of 1960, with respect to funding limitations
- Flood Control Act of 1962, with respect to the Scioto River, Ohio

== See also ==
- Investigations of levee failures during Hurricane Katrina
- 2005 levee failures in Greater New Orleans
- IHNC Lake Borgne Surge Barrier
- Rivers and Harbors Act for related legislation which sometime also implement flood control provisions.
- Standard Project Hurricane
- Water Resources Development Act
