= List of floods in Sheffield =

Floods in Sheffield, South Yorkshire, England

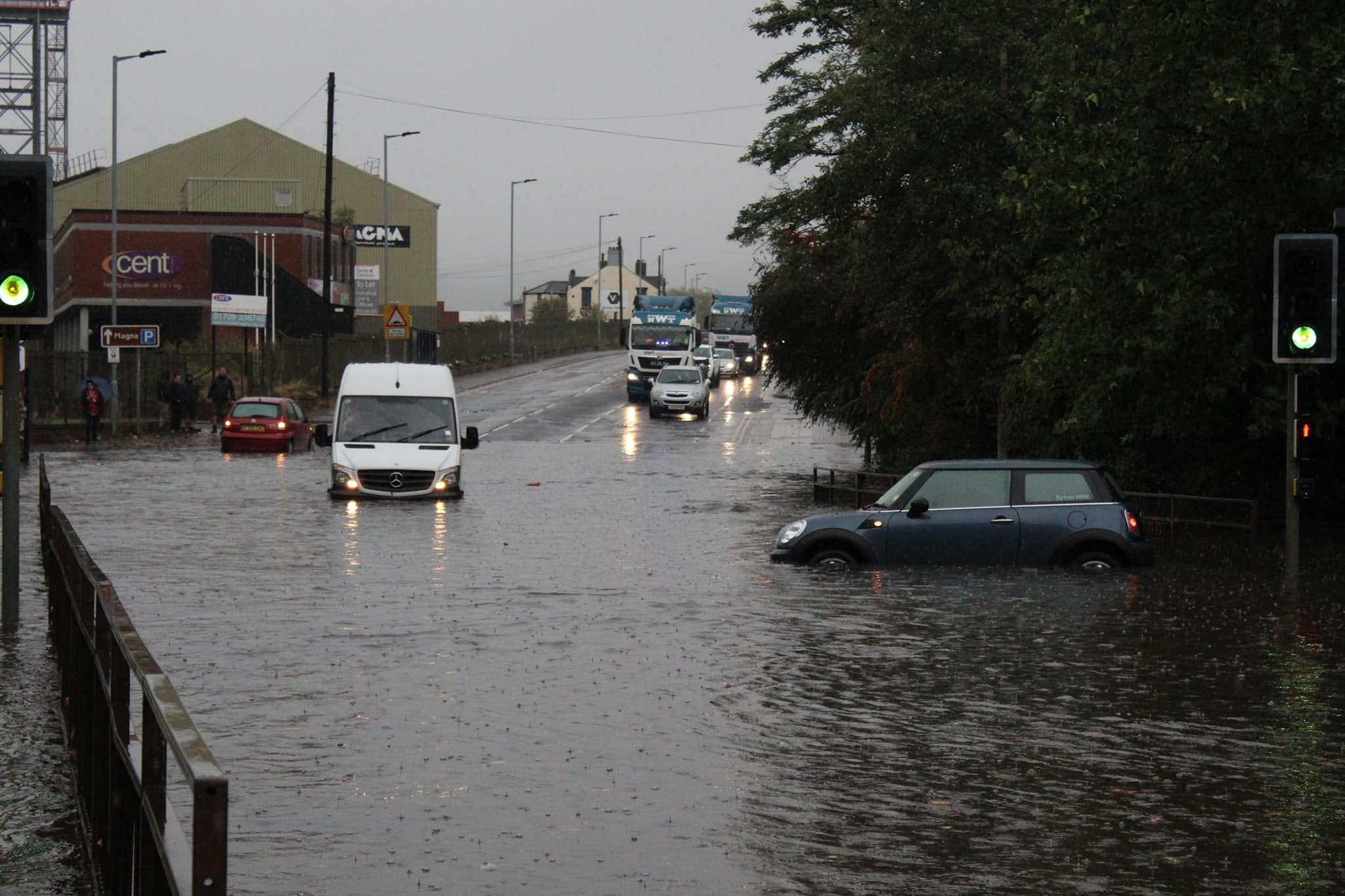
Flash flooding from Storm Bronagh in Sheffield on 20 September 2018.

This is a list of floods in Sheffield, South Yorkshire, England.

== Background ==
Sheffield is located on the confluence of five major rivers (Don, Porter, Loxley, Rivelin, and the Sheaf), and is nestled in several hills. As a result, it is prone to flooding.

- 1864: A newly built dam, at Low Bradfield on the River Loxley, broke while it was being filled for the first time. An estimated 3 million m³ (700 million imperial gallons) of water swept down the Loxley Valley, through Loxley village and on to Malin Bridge and Hillsborough, where the River Loxley joins the River Don. The flood wrecked nearly every bridge as far as Lady’s Bridge, destroyed 800 houses, and killed 270 people.
- 1973: An estimated 119 mm (4.7 in) of rain fell in just one day, leading to severe flooding, despite there being much less development on the flood plain than in later floods.
- 1991: The River Sheaf reached its highest level ever recorded at the Sheaf Screen recording site on 21 December 1991. Extensive flooding impacted the lower Sheaf Valley, including Sheffield station which was inundated. A tree branch left behind on platform 5 by the 1991 floods was left in situ with a small plaque attached to commemorate the event.
- 1998: Heavy rainfall for several days at the end of October caused flooding in the south of the city. The River Drone at nearby Dronfield reached its highest ever recorded level on 27 October.
- 2000: The area of Catcliffe suffered from severe flooding due to heavy rainfall. Local flood barriers were built following the flooding after demands by residents.
- 2007: On 25 June, Sheffield suffered extensive damage as the River Don over-topped its banks, causing widespread flooding in the Don Valley area of the city. A 14-year-old boy was swept away by the swollen River Sheaf and a 68-year-old man died after attempting to cross a flooded road in Sheffield city centre. The Meadowhall shopping centre was closed due to flooding with some shops remaining closed downstairs until late September and Sheffield Wednesday's ground Hillsborough was under 6 feet (1.83 m) of water. A number of people had to be rescued by RAF helicopters from buildings in the Brightside area.
- 2009: Flash flooding due to a sudden torrential rainfall on 10 June left Norfolk Park, Arbourthorne and parts of the city centre up to 5 feet deep in floodwater. Many people in areas affected by the floods in 2007 again faced evacuation from their homes. Sheffield railway station suspended all departures and arrivals at 7:20 pm, with train services from Manchester being turned away earlier in the afternoon due to flooding in the city. An underground car park at Ponds Forge leisure centre was submerged in water. Shoreham Street, outside Sheffield United's Bramall Lane football ground, suffered from severe flooding despite not being particularly affected two years earlier, with many southern areas of the city suffering the worst of the flooding, in contrast to 2007.
- 2012: A day of heavy rainfall on 7 July on already saturated ground led to flash flooding and rapidly rising river levels in the area. South Yorkshire Police advised the public to avoid the Meadowhall area because of dangerously high water levels on the River Don. An emergency command centre was set up by local authorities over fears of flooding in the city.
- 2018: Considerable flash flooding, the worst since the June 2007 floods, occurred across Sheffield on 20 September 2018 as a result of heavy rainfall from Storm Bronagh.
- 2019: Heavy rainfall in the South Yorkshire caused the River Don to break its banks in several places in and around Sheffield, and causing shoppers to be contained in Meadowhall by the South Yorkshire Police.
