= List of engineering blunders =

List of engineering errors

This is a list of engineering blunders, i.e., gross errors or mistakes resulting from grave lack of proper consideration, such as stupidity, confusion, carelessness, or culpable ignorance, which resulted in notable incidents.

- Deepwater Horizon oil spill caused by a faulty blowout preventer.
- Fort Montgomery was sometimes referred to as "Fort Blunder", because the first version of the U.S. Army fort was inadvertently built on the Canadian side of Lake Champlain.
- The Hyatt Regency walkway collapse where 114 people died because the design of the support system had been changed.
- Millennium Bridge, London, nicknamed "Wobbly Bridge"; it took almost two years to fix the engineering error
- The NASA Mars Climate Orbiter, launched in 1998, burned up in the Martian atmosphere. A mixup between metric and US Standard measurements in the controlling software caused the spacecraft to miss its intended 140–150 km altitude above Mars during orbit insertion, instead entering the Martian atmosphere at about 57 km.
- The NASA Genesis mission was an attempt to sample particles from the solar wind. It successfully collected a sample and returned to Earth. However at the last moment the landing parachute failed to open and the return capsule smashed into the ground at high speed, contaminating the samples. The parachute failure was traced to an accelerometer installed backwards.
- Palace II, Brazil; parts of it collapsed, due to engineering error, killing eight people.
- Quebec Bridge collapses
- Sand Point Light: it was constructed with its tower facing the land instead of facing the water. Whether this was intentional or an engineering blunder is unknown.
- Tacoma Narrows Bridge (1940); it began to move vertically in windy conditions, so it was nicknamed "Galloping Gertie". It collapsed in November 1940, after four months of operation

== See also ==
- Category:Engineering failures; not all of them are due to engineering errors
- Engineering disasters
- Catastrophic failure Structural failures
- Space accidents and incidents
