= List of disasters in Fiji by death toll =

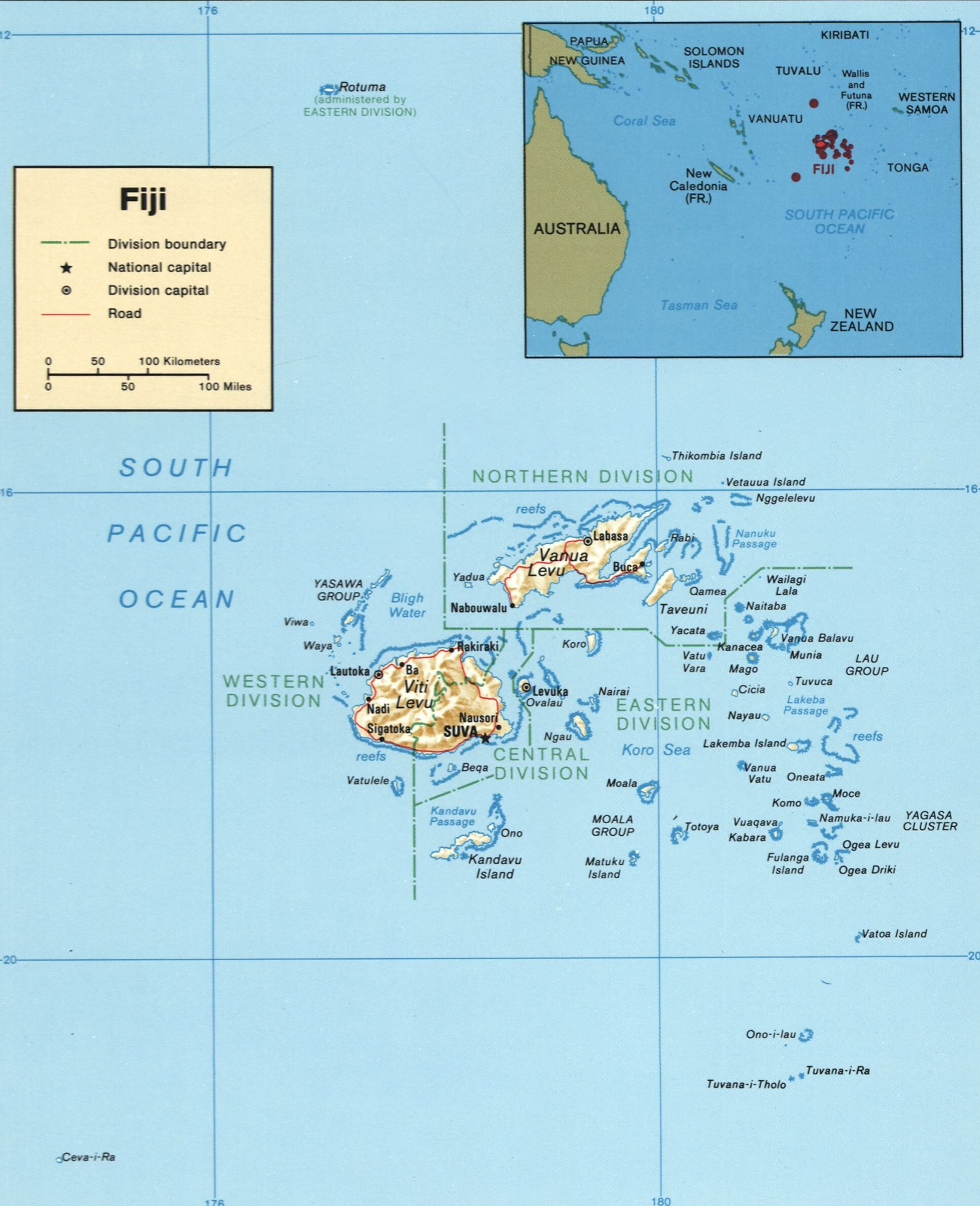
Political map of Fiji

This list of Fijian disasters by death toll includes major disasters (excluding acts of war) that occurred on Fijian soil or involved Fijian citizens, in a definable incident.

Fatalities	Year	Article	Type	Location	Comments
878	2020–2024	COVID-19 pandemic in Fiji	Pandemic	Widespread	
225	1931	1931 Fijian Flood	Cyclone/Flood	primarily Viti Levu	
89	1964	Sinking of the Kadavulevu	Shipwreck	Offshore of Suva, Viti Levu	
59	1884	Syria shipwreck	Shipwreck	Nasilai Reef, Tailevu Province	
54	1973	Sinking of the Uluilakeba	Shipwreck	Lau Province	Occurred during Cyclone Lottie
53+	1952	1952 Hurricane	Cyclone	Widespread	
44	2016	Cyclone Winston	Cyclone	Widespread	
30	1973	Sinking of the Makogai	Shipwreck	Between Kabara and Fulaga, Lau Province	Occurred during Cyclone Lottie.
25	1985	Cyclone Eric	Cyclone	Widespread	
25	1930	1930 Hurricane	Cyclone	Widespread	
25	1985	Cyclone Nigel	Cyclone	Widespread	
24+	1929	1929 Hurricane	Cyclone	Widespread	
23	1992/1993	Cyclone Kina	Cyclone	Widespread	
19	1972	Cyclone Bebe	Cyclone	Widespread	
18	1997	Cyclone Gavin	Cyclone	Widespread	
18	1941	Sinking of the Rogovoka	Shipwreck	Offshore of Vatu Ithake, Lomaiviti Province	
18	1910	1910 Hurricane	Cyclone	Widespread	
17	2003	Cyclone Ami	Cyclone	Widespread	
17	1999	Air Fiji Flight 121	Plane crash	Naitasiri Province, Viti Levu	
16	1965	1965 Fiji Airways crash	Plane crash	Somosomo, Taveuni, Cakaudrove Province	
12	1945	1945 RNZAF PBY-5A Catalina crash	Plane crash	Beqa Island, Serua Province	
11	2004	Tropical Depression 10F (2004)	Tropical Depression	primarily Viti Levu	
11	2009	January 2009 Fiji floods	Flooding	Widespread	
11	2002	Kubulau ship disaster	Shipwreck	Between Koro and Taveuni, Cakaudrove Province	
11	1986	1986 Nadi plane crash	Plane crash	Nadi, Ba Province, Viti Levu	
9	1983	Cyclone Oscar	Cyclone	Widespread	
9	1914	1914 floods	Floods	Rewa Province, Viti Levu	
9	1979	1979 Fiji Air crash	Plane crash	Bua Province, Vanua Levu	
8+	2012	January 2012 Fiji floods	Flooding	Viti Levu and Vanua Levu	
8	1953	1953 Suva earthquake	Earthquake	Viti Levu and surrounding islands	
7	2008	Cyclone Gene	Cyclone	Widespread	
7	1939	1939 Cyclone	Cyclone	Namosi Province, Viti Levu	
6	1988	Cyclone Bola	Cyclone	Widespread	
6	1941	1941 Hurricane	Cyclone	Viti Levu	
6	1986	1986 Suva landslides	Landslides	Suva, Viti Levu	
6	2018	Nabou Minibus crash	Vehicle collision	Nadroga-Navosa Province, Viti Levu	
5	2021	Cyclone Ana	Cyclone	Widespread	1 confirmed death and 4 missing persons
5	2007	2007 Labasa flash flood	Flash flood	Labasa, Macuata Province, Vanua Levu	
5	1944	1944 RNZAF Lockheed PV-1 Ventura crash	Plane crash	Nausori, Viti Levu	

== See also ==
- List of disasters in New Zealand by death toll
- List of disasters in Australia by death toll
