= The New Orleans Levee =

American satirical newspaper

- "We Don't Hold Anything Back"
- Type: Monthly satire publication
- Format: Print
- Founder: Rudy Matthew Vorkapic
- Publisher: Rudy Matthew Vorkapic
- Headquarters: New Orleans, Louisiana, United States
- Circulation: 25,000 monthly

The New Orleans Levee was a New Orleans–based, American satire publication founded by editor and publisher Rudy Matthew Vorkapic. (Note: Though the Levee itself hasn't said that it no longer exists, its website (nolevee.com) is a law blog as of 2022) It printed 25,000 copies monthly. The Levee's tagline was "We Don't Hold Anything Back". The paper targeted area politicians and some non-politicians whom the paper's staff saw as ruining the recovery efforts after the levee failures amid Hurricane Katrina in New Orleans.
