= List of modern infrastructure failures =

Infrastructure includes the basic physical and organizational structures needed for the operation of a society or enterprise, or the services and facilities necessary for an economy to function. This entry aggregates articles on and lists of modern infrastructure failures by category (type of infrastructure).

== Structural ==
- List of structural failures and collapses
- Category:Collapsed buildings and structures
- List of bridge failures
- List of dam failures
- Category:Dam failures
- Levee failures and breaches
- List of catastrophic collapses of radio masts and towers

== Electrical and utility ==
- Power outages
- 2007 New York City steam explosion
- Electric power blackouts

== Transportation ==
- Lists of rail accidents
- Accidents and incidents involving commercial aircraft
- Airship accidents
- Accidents and disasters by death toll
- Road accidents
- Airliner accidents and incidents caused by in-flight structural failure
- Airliner accidents and incidents caused by mechanical failure

== Nuclear ==
- Nuclear accidents
- Nuclear and radiation accidents
- Military nuclear accidents
- Civilian nuclear power accidents
- Nuclear accidents and incidents

== Space ==
- Space Shuttle: Columbia disaster, Challenger disaster
- Space accidents and incidents

== Other ==
- Engineering failures
- Collapsed oil platforms
