= Reconstruction of New Orleans =

Process of rebuilding the city of New Orleans after Hurricane Katrina

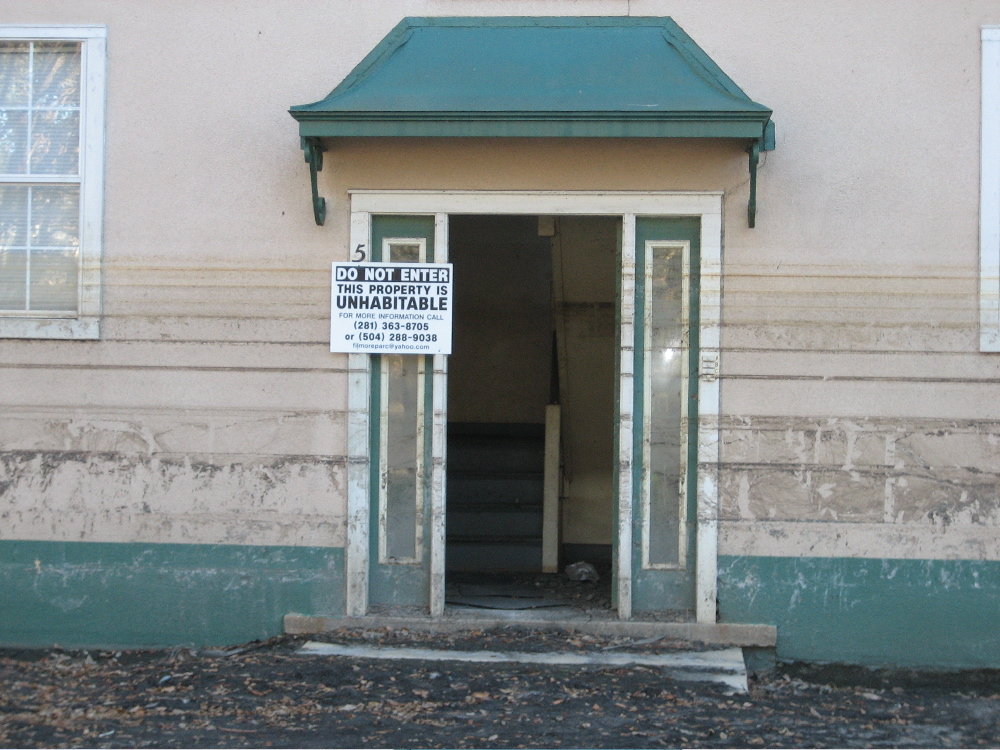
After the flooding: Building displays lines from various levels of long standing floodwaters and has been deemed "unhabitable".

The reconstruction of New Orleans refers to the process of rebuilding the city following the failure of levees and floodwalls during Hurricane Katrina on August 29, 2005. The federally built hurricane protection, called the Lake Pontchartrain and Vicinity Hurricane Protection Project failed, resulting in breaches that released tens of billions of gallons of water flooding approximately 80% of the city. The flooding remained in the city for days, in many places for weeks.

Over 204,000 homes were severely damaged or destroyed, and an estimated 200,000 vehicles were totaled. More than 800,000 citizens were displaced—the greatest displacement in the United States since the Dust Bowl of the 1930s.

Residential reconstruction was hindered by bureaucratic problems in the heavily criticized Road Home rebuilding program which was federally funded and state-managed. Critics also said that national politics factored into the program which was based on pre-storm home values, leading to disparities between rich and poor. Faith-based and volunteer agencies provided considerable supplemental relief.

The original flood protection system was redesigned and built at a cost of $14.5 billion and was 100% funded by the Army Corps through post-Katrina emergency appropriations. The new system was renamed the Hurricane & Storm Damage Risk Reduction System (HSDRRS) and is an integrated flood protection system designed to provide the Greater New Orleans area with a 100-year level of risk reduction.

== Background ==
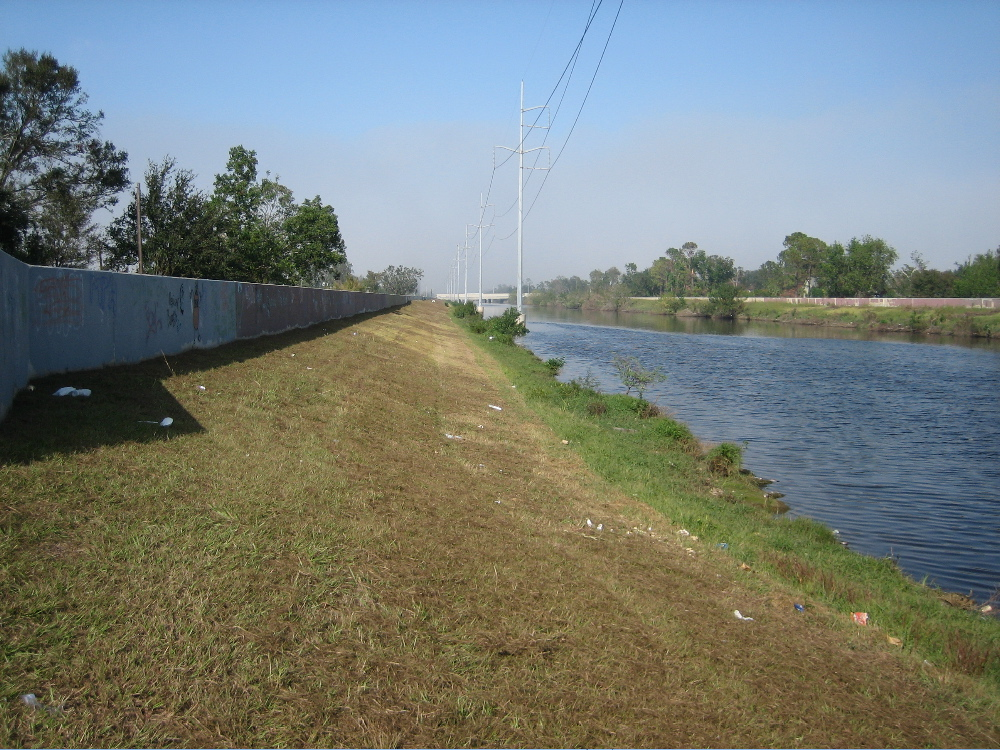
A portion of the 17th Street Canal, looking lakeward from behind the Metarie Road Pumping Station. Note the levees topped with concrete flood walls.

=== New Orleans geography ===
Flooding due to rain and storms has long been an issue since the New Orleans's early settlement due to the city's location on a delta marsh, 50% of which sits below sea level. The city is surrounded by the Mississippi River to the south, Lake Pontchartrain to the north, and Lake Borgne to the east. Construction of the levees along the River began soon after the city was founded, and more extensive river levees were built as the city grew. The levees were originally designed to prevent damage caused by seasonal flooding. By summer of 2005, the 17th Street Canal and London Avenue Canal are used for drainage, to pump water from the city streets out to Lake Pontchartrain. Floodwalls (called I-walls) embedded in the canals are one foot (300 mm) wide at the top and widened to two feet (610 mm) at the base. The visible portion is a concrete cap on steel sheet pile that anchors to the wall. Sheet piles are interlocked steel columns, in this case at least 30 feet (9.1 m) long, with 6 to 10 feet (1.8 to 3.0 m) visible above ground. The wide, navigable Industrial Canal is used for shipping.

Prior to 1965, the local Orleans Levee District (OLD) built and maintained New Orleans' drainage and hurricane protection and shouldered 100% of the cost. But, heavy flooding during Hurricane Betsy brought concerns regarding flooding from hurricanes to the forefront. In the Flood Control Act of 1965, Congress directed the Army Corps have sole authority over the design and construction of the New Orleans area flood protection and the OLD shall maintain projects when completed and pay 30% of the cost. The flood protection project was called the Lake Pontchartrain and Vicinity Hurricane Protection Project. Forty years later when Katrina struck, the flood protection was between 60-90% completed with an estimated completion date of 2015, despite the initial expectation of completion within thirteen years. As of May 2005, work in Orleans Parish was certified as 90% complete, with "some work remaining" along the London Avenue Canals, and 70% complete in Jefferson Parish.

There were many predictions of hurricane risk in New Orleans before Hurricane Katrina in August, 2005. In 2001, the Houston Chronicle published a story which predicted that a severe hurricane striking New Orleans, "would strand 250,000 people or more, and probably kill one of 10 left behind as the city drowned under 20 feet (6.1 m) of water. Thousands of refugees could land in Houston." Many concerns also focused around the fact that the city's levee system was only designed for hurricanes of no greater intensity than category 3.

In addition, the region's natural defenses, the surrounding marshland and the barrier islands, have been dwindling in recent years due to human interference, mainly the energy industry.

==== Pre-storm preparations ====
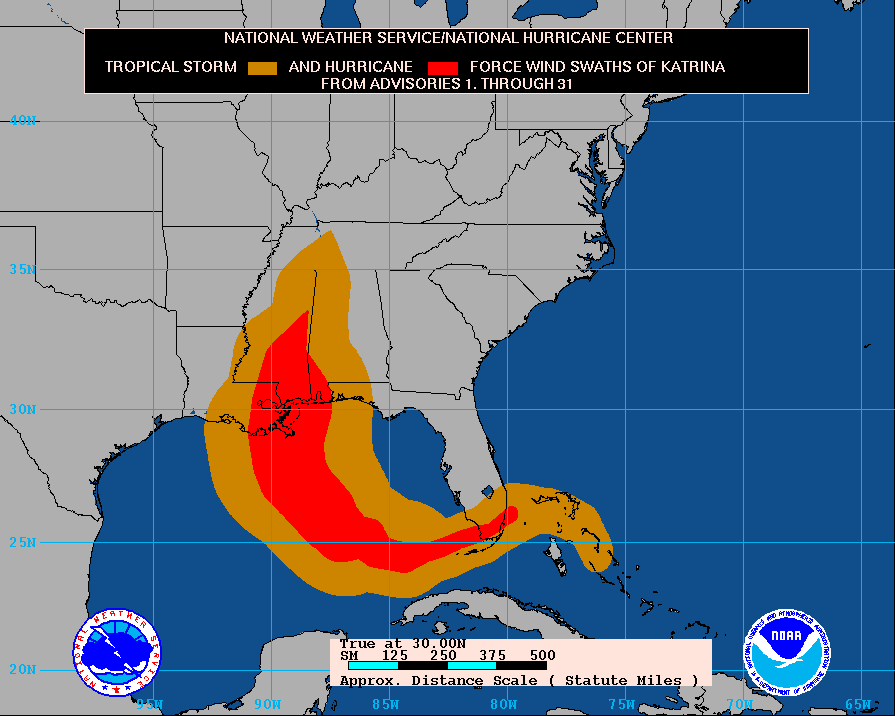
Strength of Katrina's winds. (NOAA)

On Saturday, August 27, while Katrina was a Category 3 storm gathering strength in the Gulf of Mexico, the Army Corps of Engineers Mississippi Valley Division was preparing and posturing elements from as far as Hawaii. Anticipating the possibility of a Category 5 storm placing water in New Orleans, preparations began for drainage operations.

On August 29, 2005, as Katrina made its second and third landfalls on the Louisiana-Mississippi coast, Corps District Commander, Col. Richard Wagenaar, and a team worked out of an emergency operations shelter in New Orleans. Other teams waited in the storm's path across the Gulf coast.

The Corps worked with the U.S. Coast Guard, Army National Guard and other state and federal authorities to bring in all assets available to expedite the process. "We're attempting to contract for materials, such as rock, super sand bags, cranes, etc., and also for modes of transportation like barges and helicopters, to close the gap and stop the flow of water from Lake Pontchartrain into the city," said Walter Baumy, Engineering Division chief and project manager for closing the breach.

== Hurricane Katrina ==
=== Levee failures ===
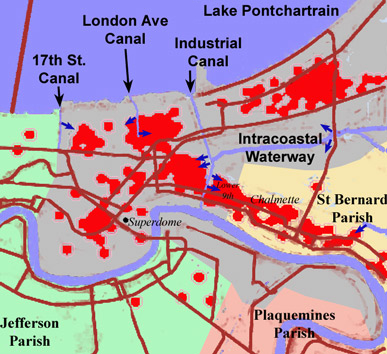
Sketch of New Orleans (shaded gray), indicating the locations of the principal breaches in the levees/floodwalls (dark blue arrows). Red dots show locations of deaths.

There were 28 reported failures in the first 24 hours and over 50 were reported in the ensuing days. Before dawn on Monday August 29, 2005, waves overtopped and eroded the Mississippi River-Gulf Outlet levees. At about 5:00 am, a 30-foot section of floodwall, called a "monolith," on the east side of the Inner Harbor Navigation Canal (known locally as the Industrial Canal), breached and released flood water into the adjacent Lower Ninth Ward, a dense lower to middle class neighborhood of primarily Black homeowners. By 6:30 a.m. CDT, levees along the Gulf Intracoastal Waterway, lining the south side of New Orleans East, also overtopped and breached. The surge flooded the primarily middle to upper class Black region.

On the west edge of New Orleans, between 6 and 7:00 am, a monolith on the east side of the London Avenue Canal failed and allowed water over 10 feet deep into Fillmore Gardens, a mostly Black middle class neighborhood. At about 6:30 a.m., on the western edge of the city, several monoliths failed on the 17th Street Canal. A torrent of water blasted into Lakeview, a mainly White middle class neighborhood of homeowners. Local fire officials reported the breach. At about 8am, a second breach opened up in the London Avenue Canal, this one on the opposite side allowing water to flood the Lake Vista neighborhood. The Duncan and Bonnabel Pumping Stations were also reported to have suffered roof damage, and were non-functional.

At approximately 7:45 a.m. CDT, a much larger second hole opened up in the Industrial Canal just south of the initial breach. Floodwaters from the two breaches combined to submerge the entire historic Lower Ninth Ward in over 10 feet of water. Between 7 and 8:00 am, the west side of the London Avenue Canal breached, in addition to the east side, and flooded the adjacent mixed-race neighborhood of homeowners.

The Orleans Avenue Canal midway between the 17th Street Canal and the London Avenue Canal, engineered to the same standards, and presumably put under similar stress during the hurricane, survived intact due, in part, to the presence of an unintended 100-foot-long ‘spillway,’ a section of legacy wall that was significantly lower than the adjacent floodwalls.

In September 2022, the Associated Press issued a style guide change to Katrina stating that reporters when writing about the storm in New Orleans should note that “…levee failures played a major role in the devastation in New Orleans. In some stories, that can be as simple as including a phrase about Hurricane Katrina’s catastrophic levee failures and flooding….”

=== Flooding ===
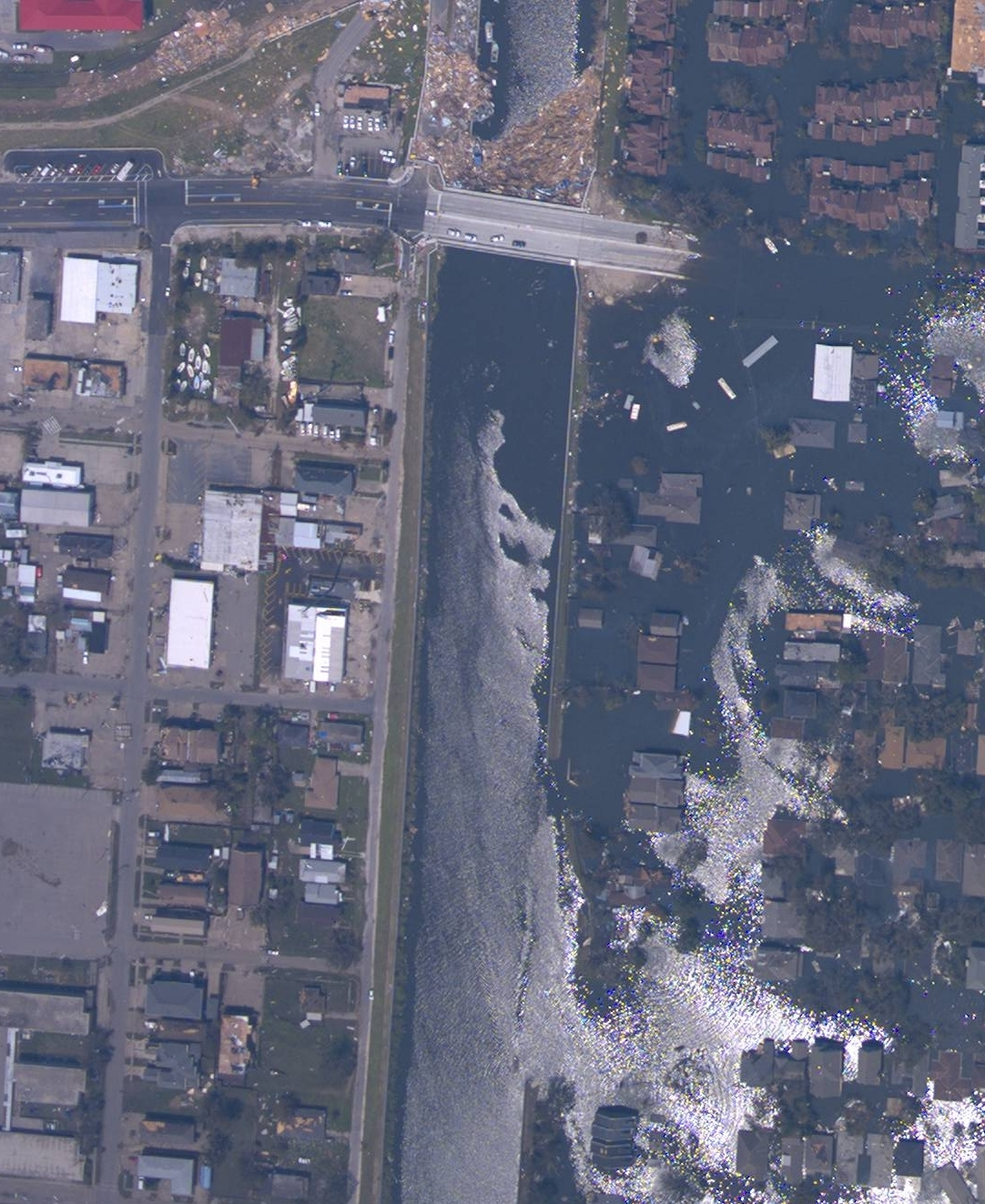
Breach in 17th Street Canal floodwall in New Orleans, Louisiana, August 31, 2005. (NOAA)

Army Corps' engineers initially believed that water in the 17th Street Canal overtopped the floodwall, scoured behind the wall, and caused it to collapse. However, three local fire captains confirmed with video footage that the floodwall had failed before water reached the top. The floodwall breached on the lower (New Orleans West End) side inland from the Old Hammond Highway Bridge.

There were three major breaches at the Industrial Canal; one on the upper side near the junction with MR-GO, and two on the lower side along the Lower Ninth Ward, between Florida Avenue and Claiborne Avenue. The London Avenue Canal breached in two places, on the upper side just back from Robert E. Lee Boulevard, and on the lower side a block in from the Mirabeau Avenue Bridge.

By the evening of August 29, 2005, approximately 28 levee failures were reported throughout the city. Approximately 66% to 75% of the city was now under water. The National Weather Service had predicted intense wind damage severity, but these predictions were not realized due to Katrina's path. Nonetheless, many power lines were down and the remains of trees and buildings blocked streets.

As Army Corps workers began working with the Federal Emergency Management Agency (FEMA) begin work on city cleanup and civil engineering tasks, several boats surveyed the flooded areas and blocked waterways around the city. The Army Corps used crane barges to remove barges that had been washed atop bridges and other structures.

Plans were made to begin levee work, including the placement of 3,000 pound sand bags on the 17 Street Canal. Army National Guard helicopters began assisting in this operation August 31. Meanwhile, Lake Pontchartrain started slowly draining and was expected to return to normal levels in about 36 hours.

=== Bridges, roadways, and railways ===
Approximately 45 bridges were damaged by some aspect of the hurricane. Several major bridges were among the worst damaged, with the I-10 Twin Span Bridge as the most catastrophic failure with over 470 spans separated from their supports and nearly 65 fallen completely into the water. Other vital bridges damaged enough to impede traffic included the Pontchartrain Causeway, St. Louis Bay Bridge, and Biloxi Bay Bridge.

Mississippi railways and roads, when not affected by bridge collapsing, were disrupted due to heavy debris. Removal costs are estimated at $200 million for that area. Damage to the Louisiana roadway systems was mostly due to washouts and has been deemed minimal.

=== Investigations of levee failures ===
There were seven major Investigations of levee failures during Hurricane Katrina. The first investigation was announced on October 19, 2005. Defense Secretary Donald Rumsfeld announced that an independent panel of experts, under the direction of the National Academy of Sciences, would convene to evaluate the performance of the New Orleans levee system and issue a final report in eight months. The panel would study the results provided by the two existing teams of experts that had already examined the levee failures. The academy concluded that "the engineering of the levee system was not adequate. The procedures for designing and constructing hurricane protection systems will have to be improved, and the designing organizations must upgrade their engineering capabilities. The levees must be seen not as a system to protect real estate but as a set of dams to protect people. There must be independent peer reviews of future designs and construction."

== Emergency repairs ==
=== Recovery ===
The recovery of New Orleans was seen as a three-phase process: first and most immediate, to unwater the city and assess flood protection. Second, to provide an interim level of protection to get the city through the 2005 hurricane season and later high water, and over the long-term, to return the flood protection system to pre-hurricane conditions. This would take a tremendous amount of study, research, funding and construction. Brig. Gen. Robert Crear stated on September 2 that the process of removing water was estimated to take between 36 and 80 days.

=== Unwatering the city of New Orleans ===
==== Task Force Unwatering ====
The Army Corps performed a detailed assessment of about 350 miles (560 km) of hurricane levee and developed a comprehensive, prioritized plan to repair it and the pumping stations that support New Orleans and surrounding areas. "The system in its present condition does not ensure that the city will be protected from flooding resulting from storms or hurricanes," stressed Col. Duane Gapinski, Task Force Unwatering commander. State and local leaders were informed as assessments were being completed and repairs were made. Eight Honolulu Army engineers left on August 28 help with relief efforts and to worked with the 249th Engineer Battalion (Prime Power) to assess, install and maintain emergency generators.

By September 6, the pump stations were pumping water from the flooded city back into Lake Ponchartrain. Portable pumps were used to remove water from the city. By September 6, the estimated area of flooding was reduced to 60%. On September 7th, 23 of the 148 permanent pumps had now been restored to operation. On September 7, it was estimated, based on average seasonal rainfall, that Orleans Parish would be drained by the week of October 2, 2005. New Orleans East would be drained by the week of October 8, 2005, and Plaquemines Parish would be drained by the week of October 18, 2005. By Saturday, September 10, 2005, there were 148 organic pumps in the New Orleans area being worked, with an average of 26 permanent pumps operating, pumping 9,125 cubic feet per second (cfs) and 39 portable pumps were operating, pumping 723 cfs. As of midnight Sept 11, three-quarters of a billion gallons of water was being drained - or the equivalent to an Olympic-sized swimming pool was being drained every two seconds. By September 15, 2005, the inundation of the city had been reduced from 80% to 40%, although flooded areas were not expected to be habitable for a long while. On September 18, the Army Corps estimated the New Orleans area was more than 80 percent unwatered. Corps officials estimated the overall unwatering effort, given normal seasonal rainfall, would be completed no later than early October, 2005.

==== Temporary levee breach repairs ====
===== Task Force Guardian =====
The Army Corps created Task Force Guardian to provide an interim level of protection to get the city through the 2005 hurricane season and in the longer term restore the city's ability to resist a Category 3 hurricane by June of 2006. Task Force Guardian identified the most critical drainage canal breach sites that needed immediate closing. These were the London Avenue Canal in the Gentilly region of the city and also the 17th Street Canal in the western most part of the city.

===== 17th Street Canal breach =====
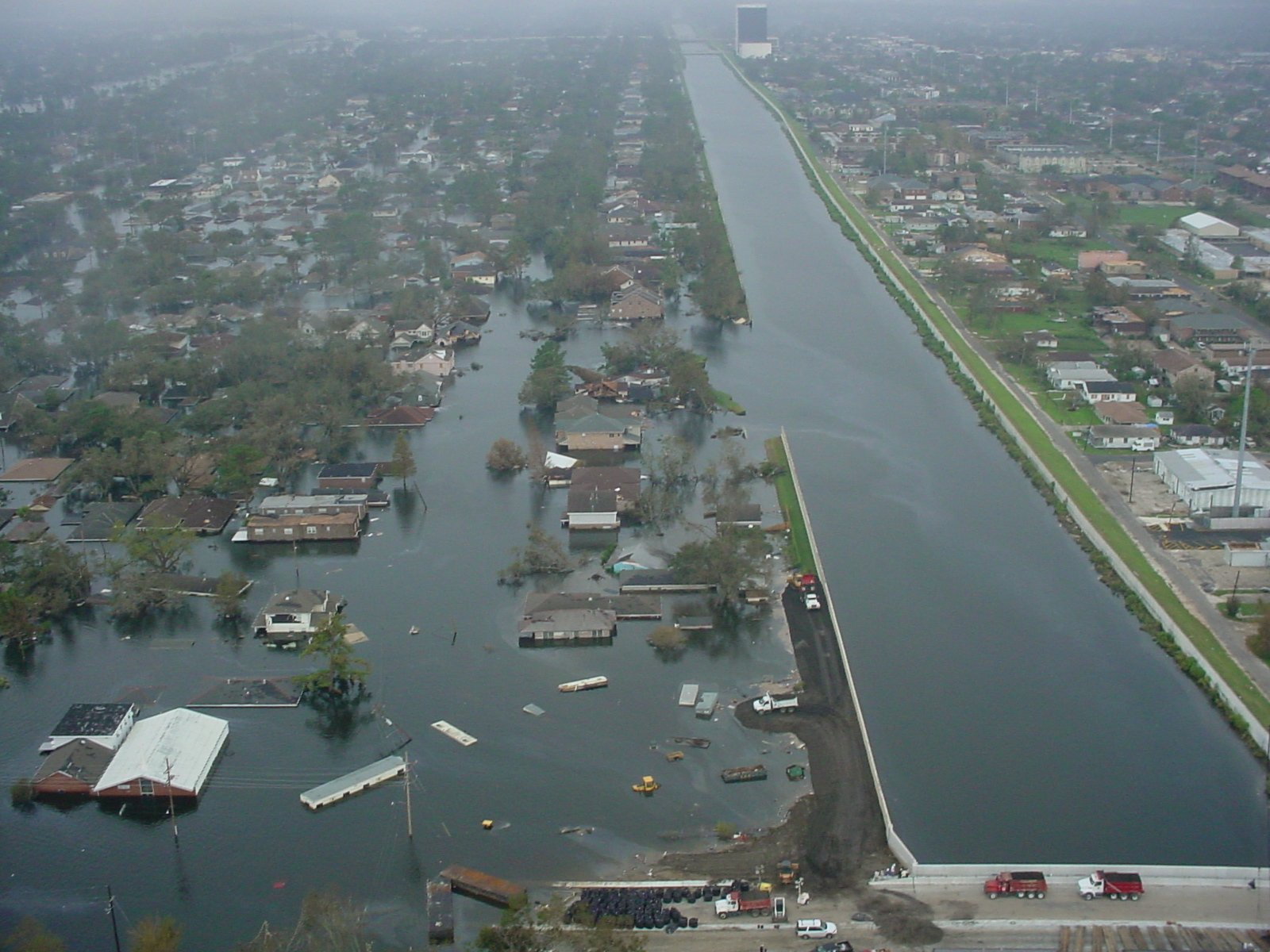
Building roadway toward 17th Street Canal breach. (USACE)

The breach at the 17th Street Canal, a levee-floodwall combination, was found to be about 450ft. (137 m) long. Operating with pump station 6, the canal is a critical element of the New Orleans main basin flood control as a drainage conduit. The Corps released two contracts to close the breach in the 17th Street Canal. A Texas National Guard helicopter dropped 3,000 pound sandbags into the breach site and then switched to 6,000 pound sandbags. These were completely washed away and the initial attempt failed. The Corps then contracted to build an access roads to the breach site from Old Hammond Highway and fill in the breach with rock, stone and crushed concrete hauled in by truck. Rock was being transported from offsite to complete the access road and closure at the 17th Street breach.

The next step at the 17th Street Canal was to cut off flow from Lake Pontchartrain. Corps officials then worked with Orleans Parish and Louisiana Department of Transportation officials and Boh Bros. Construction Co., to drive 150 feet of sheet pilings at the lakefront. By September 1, 2005, the mouth of the 17th Street Canal had been sealed with the sheet piling preventing lake water from getting to the levee breach. On September 7th, three pumps were operating and discharging water at around 2,250 cubic feet per second, or cfs. One week to the day after Katrina, the 17th Street Canal breach was closed.

===== London Avenue Canal breach sites =====
The London Avenue Canal had breach sites on both sides approximately ten city blocks apart. Texas Army National Guard Chinook and Blackhawk helicopter crews had placed an average of 600 7,000-pound sandbags each day into the breaches. Depending on the helicopters lift capability, Corps riggers averaged one to three hookups every two minutes during daylight hours. Sandbagging operations ran 24 hours for ten days. As at the 17th Street Canal, water flow from Lake Pontchartrain into the canal had been cut off when Army Corps contractors drove 150 feet (46 m) of steel piling across the canal mouth to seal it.

From the London Avenue west side breach, a road was built to the second breach area at Mirabeau Avenue. Corps personnel were monitoring both breach sites around the clock. Contractors maintained cranes at the sites to regulate flow levels by adjusting sheet pile walls at the mouths of the canals into Lake Pontchartrain. By September 5, 2005, the breaches of London Avenue Canal were closed. By September 12, 2005, water had overtopped the temporary breach closure at the London Avenue Canal because of operations at Pump Station 3. This caused the canal to rise faster than the temporary pumps at the end of the canal could drain. Operations at Pump Station 3 were immediately stopped and a few sheet piles were removed to allow the canal water level to equalize. Construction of an access road to the second London Avenue Canal breach just north of the Mirabeau bridge was completed September 14.

===== Inner Harbor Navigation Canal (Industrial Canal) =====
Engineers found two breaches on the east side of the Inner Harbor Navigational Canal and one on its west side. They closed the larger of the two breaches on the east side yesterday and filled the smaller of the two breaches with clay and stone. Work will begin on the west side as soon as feasible. Pump Station 19 on the west side of the Industrial Canal had been running for some time. On September 7th, pump station 19 just north of Florida Avenue, was 1,300 cpf. On the Industrial Canal, Army Corps contractors used crane barges to remove two barges from “atop” the Florida Avenue Bridge, also commonly known as the L&N Bridge.

Work continued on nearby waterways, including several locks which were closed. Use of some of the locks required raising bridges. The Industrial Canal Lock needed repair, and its lockmaster raised the St. Claude Avenue bridge, but lowered it because of hostility from civilians wanting to cross on both sides. Steps in repairing the Industrial canal breach include removal of two damaged barges and one that had sunk. The entire floodwall between the two bridges (Claiborne to the south and Florida Avenue to the north) was replaced with a T-wall and completed in mid-June 2006. The first new homes after Katrina in the Lower Ninth Ward were completed in 2007.

===== Gulf Intracoastal Waterway (GIWW) =====
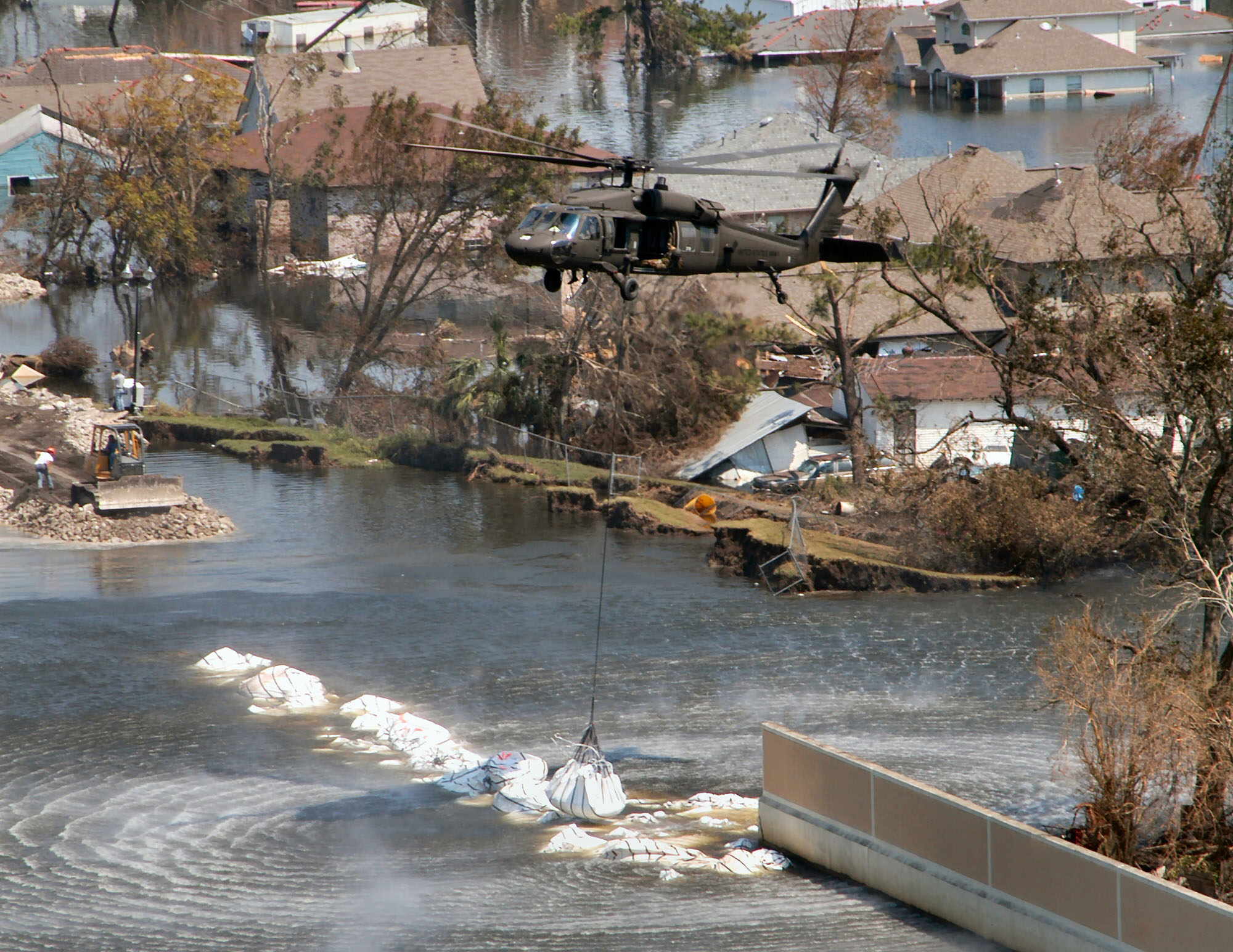
Texas Army National Guard Blackhawk deposits a 6,000 pound bag of sand and gravel on September 4. (USACE)

Katrina's surge and waves had a devastating effect on the levees along the GIWW that was constructed with materials dredged from the adjacent channels using hydraulic fill. The back sides of the levees, especially where they were composed of erodible materials, was scoured away, leading to complete breaching in many cases. One week after Katrina, Pump Station 10 at the lakefront of New Orleans East was actually pumping. Four more portable pumps were to be added in support of Pump Station 15 to increase the overall capacity.

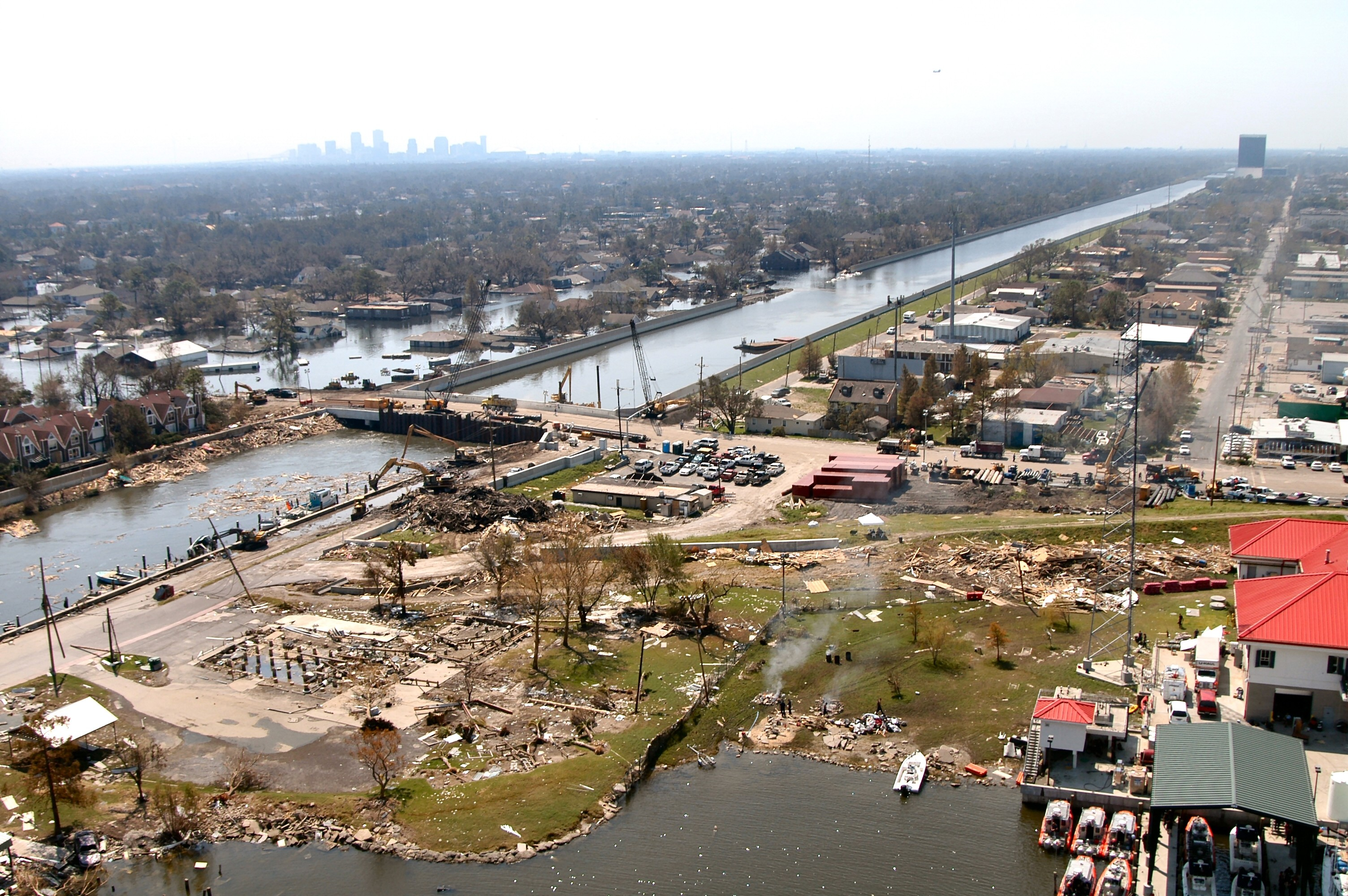
The 17th Street Canal stretches southward between Jefferson and Orleans Parishes in this aerial photo taken Sunday, September 4. (USACE)

=== Pumping and moving on ===
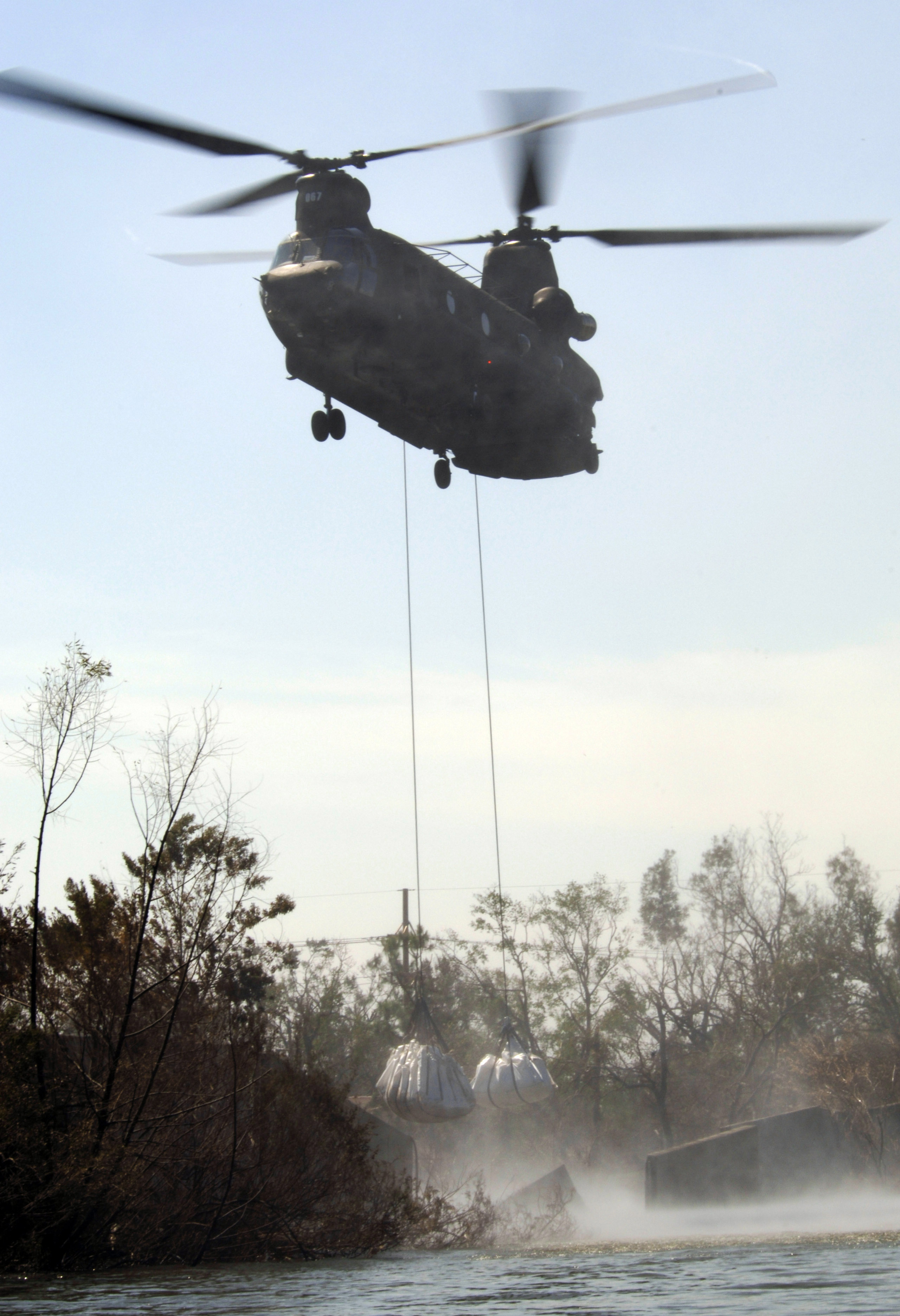
Dropping sandbags, September 7. (Navy)

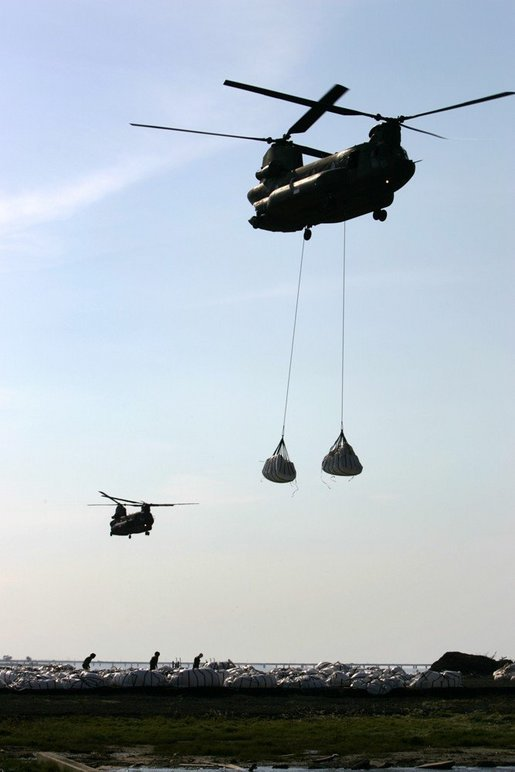
Sandbag work area near 17th Street Canal, September 8. (White House)

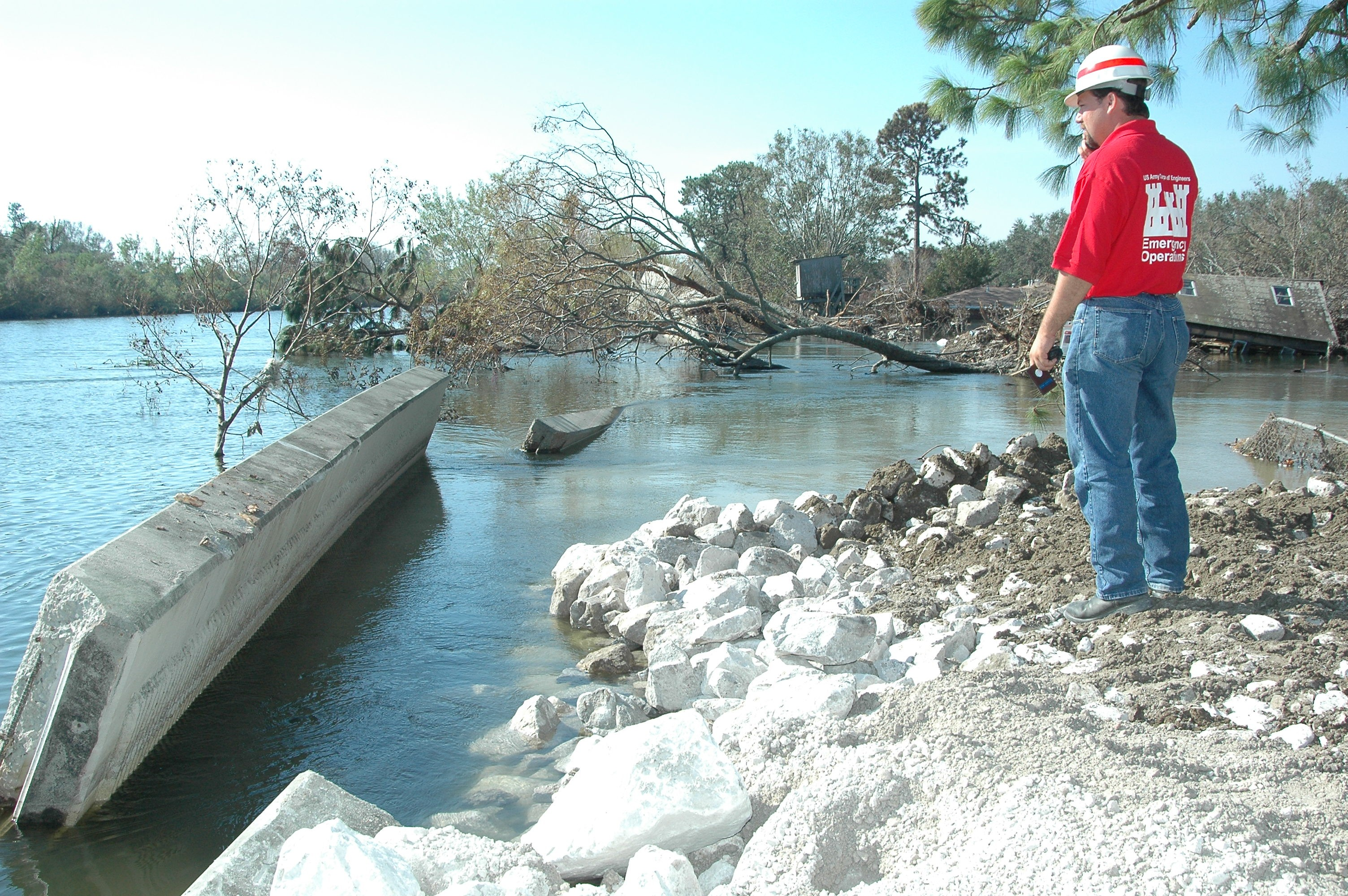
London Avenue breach. (USACE)

By September 8, approximately 100 U.S. Army Corps of Engineers workers were in New Orleans. Over 500 contracted workers were involved in repairs. Of the 174 pumps now in New Orleans area, 37 were operational, most of them operating at one-eighth capacity. On September 9, state and federal officials stated that the water that flooded much of New Orleans could be pumped out faster than expected. By September 13, most of the Ninth Ward and the southern part of Orleans Parish were dry enough for normal recovery operations to begin. Water remained in the northern part of the parish and would be pumped out using Pump Stations 12 and 4, and reinforced with about a dozen temporary pumps. The Coast Guard opened the Mississippi River to surface traffic within 5 days of Hurricane Katrina’s landfall. All of the aids to navigation that were destroyed were rebuilt or replaced within six weeks.

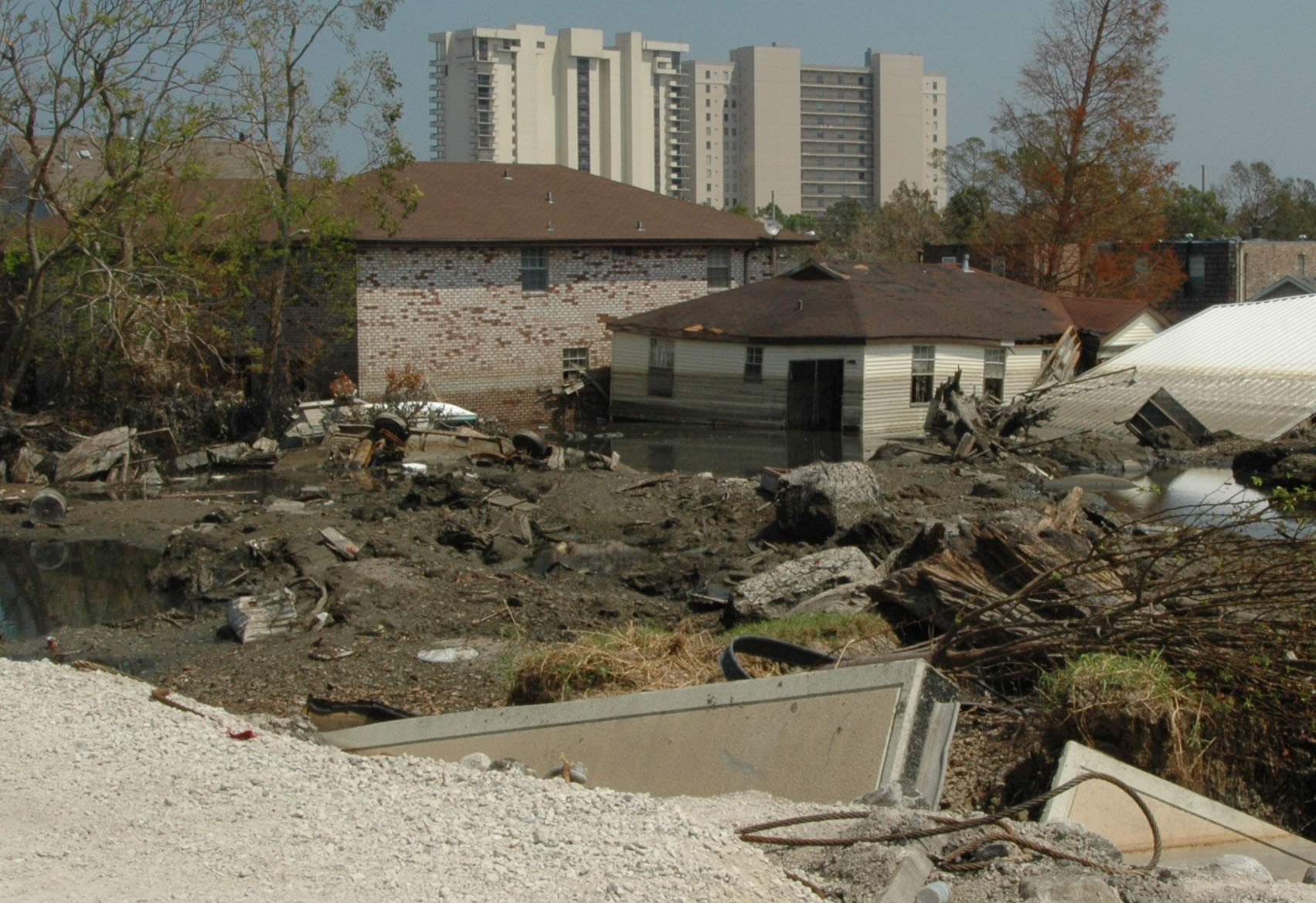
Water has receded by 17th Street Canal. (USACE)

The focus of pump repair efforts shifted from Pump Station 1 to Pump Station 4 in Orleans Parish. On September 15, 7.5 billion US gallons (28,000,000 m^{3}) of water was pumped out of the city.

=== Other infrastructure repair ===
On Monday, September 5, 2005, electrical power began to be restored to buildings in the central business district of New Orleans on a priority basis. By Thursday, September 8, Entergy had restored 9 of 17 electricity generating units in the New Orleans area to service. Entergy's 1000 MW Waterford and Watson plants were still out of service, with the Watson plant expected to require 6–12 weeks to repair. By Friday, electrical power had been restored to 11% of New Orleans customers. Also, officials were organizing to have work begin as soon as Monday, September 12, to rebuild the, "twin spans" I-10 bridge to New Orleans.

On Tuesday, September 6, 2005, the Port of New Orleans, the largest U.S. port in terms of tonnage handled, was able to receive and service relief ships. It was estimated that resumption of commercial shipments would take at least 14 days.

By Wednesday, September 7, 2005, safe drinking water was available in some West Bank areas, including Algiers and the Jefferson Parish suburbs, and some water pressure was available in New Orleans for fire fighting. All sewage from the city was flowing untreated into the Mississippi. The Lower Mississippi River was open during daylight hours to shallow draft traffic and deep draft vessels less than 39 feet (12 m). A contractor removed obstacles in the Southwest Pass, which was restricting deep draft navigation.

The Louis Armstrong New Orleans International Airport reopened on Monday, September 12, 2005, to cargo traffic, with limited passenger service expected to resume Tuesday, September 13, 2005.

Officials awarded a $30.9 million contract to repair the, "twin spans" I-10 bridge to New Orleans to Boh Brothers Construction Co. on September 12, 2005. It was estimated that 45 days would be required before the bridge could reopen to normal traffic. Water pressure had now been restored in the majority of the Jefferson Parish. A "boil water" order was still in force on the East Bank, but had been lifted for the West Bank. On the East Bank, 17% of sewage pumps were operational, and 39% were operational on the West Bank.

The Mississippi River Gulf Outlet was closed to deep draft vessels. The inland portion was serving as an alternative route to the GIWW due to closure of the IHNC for shallow draft vessels. Preliminary surveys indicated a controlling depth of 27'. The Army Corps subsequently recommended closing the outlet permanently.

=== Hurricane Rita ===
By September 21, 2005, the Army Corps of Engineers had begun closing two damaged canals at noon in preparation for storm surges associated with Hurricane Rita. The 17th Street and London Avenue Canals were closed with steel sheet piling by evening and remained closed until the threat of severe weather passed. Steel sheets would be driven deep into the canal beds near Lake Pontchartrain, providing protection from possible storm surges from the lake rushing into the damaged canals.

By September 23, 2005, although high water caused by Hurricane Rita flowed over the temporary closure on the Industrial Harbor Navigation canal, the structure remained intact. This reflooded the already-devastated Lower Ninth Ward and also the Gentilly neighborhood to the west.

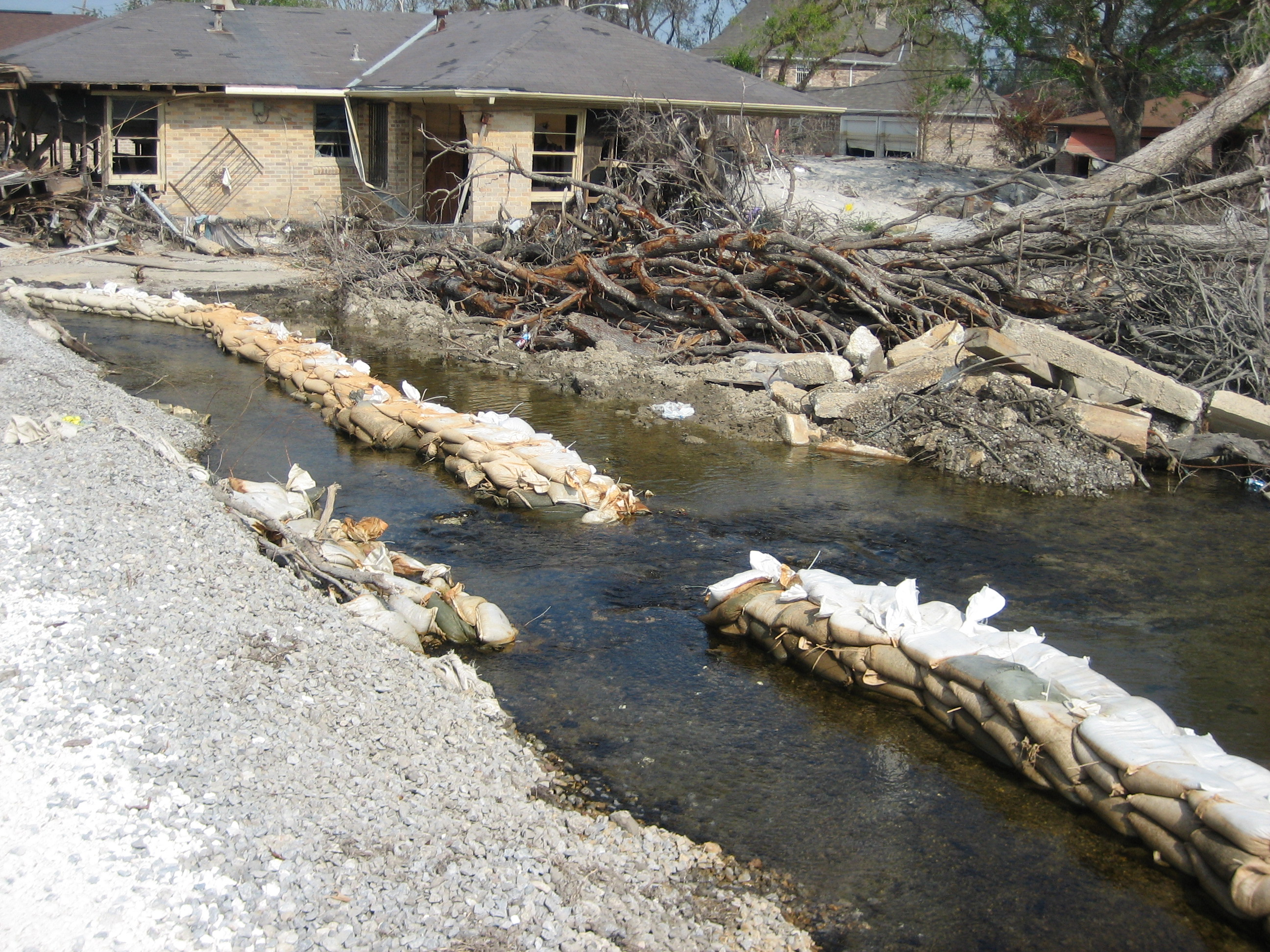
A row of sandbags behind the lower London Avenue Canal breach fails to keep water from flowing into neighborhood streets in early November 2005.

=== Future improvements ===
In January 2007, the Army Corps of Engineers, after having visited the extensive "Delta Works" levee system in the Netherlands, awarded a $150 million contract to a group of Dutch engineering companies for the evaluation, design and construction management of levees and floodwalls, special closure structures for protection of the communities adjacent to the Inner Harbor Navigation Canal, major pumping facilities and planning studies for improved levels of flood protection for New Orleans and southern Louisiana. The Delta Works are a series of constructions built between 1953 and 1997 in the southwest of the Netherlands to protect a large area of land around the Rhine-Meuse-Scheldt delta from the sea. The works consist of dams, sluices, locks, levees, and storm surge barriers. The works were initiated after the North Sea flood of 1953 in which 2,170 people were killed.

== Reconstruction ==
=== Federal funding debate ===
Some people, including Speaker of the House Dennis Hastert, questioned whether federal funds should pay to rebuild New Orleans. Others consider New Orleans's unique cultural heritage and history to be as important to the United States as, for instance, Venice is to Italy; they maintain that to not rebuild and reoccupy the city would be an immeasurable loss in that regard. The Times-Picayune ran a front-page editorial arguing for national help. It has been argued that since the US Army Corps of Engineers has had oversight over the levee system since the Great Mississippi Flood of 1927 and most of the destruction in the city occurred due to the levee failure, the federal government should be responsible for rebuilding. Senator Mary Landrieu said that Louisiana's offshore petroleum leases generate billions of dollars in revenues for the federal government's general fund, more than would be needed to restore wetlands and upgrade levee/flood control for South Louisiana to withstand category 5 storms. She argued that the federal government should either earmark some of that income for such projects or allow Louisiana to keep a significant portion of that revenue so the state could take care of its needs itself.

=== Road Home program ===
The Louisiana Recovery Authority (LRA) was a governmental body created after Katrina by Governor Kathleen Blanco to plan for the recovery and rebuilding of Louisiana under the leadership of the founding executive director, Andy Kopplin. The LRA designed and ran the Road Home program which was funded by the U.S. Government to help Louisiana residents rebuild or sell their severely damaged houses. By August 20, 2009, over 124,000 grants averaging $64,000 had been disbursed.

Complaints started as soon as the state launched the massive program. Community leaders said the largest rebuilding program in the U.S. would be unfair to the state's poorest residents. Louisiana homeowners reported that losing all their homes was less painful than dealing with the reconstruction process in their state.

=== Permanent flood protection infrastructure ===
Since Katrina, the US Army Corps of Engineers has made a $14.45 billion investment in the area around New Orleans and provided 100% of the cost.

The four largest projects are:

- The Gulf Intracoastal Waterway West Closure Complex) which can pump 1 million US gallons (3,800 m^{3}) per minute at a cost of $1 billion.
- The IHNC Lake Borgne Surge Barrier which is about 1.8 miles long and large enough to appear clearly in high-resolution satellite images.
- The Seabrook Floodgate at the connection of Lake Pontchartrain with the Industrial Canal, a major navigation channel.
- Gates and pump stations at the mouths of the three largest drainage canals in New Orleans that would prevent storm surge from entering the city via Lake Pontchartrain north of the city. The canals are the 17th Street, Orleans and London Avenue Canals.

In May 2022, nearly 17 years after Katrina, John Bel Edwards, then governor of Louisiana, declared all projects to repair and improve the New Orleans flood prevention system complete, at an estimated final cost of $15.6 billion.

=== Class action lawsuit ===
In September 2005, a class action lawsuit was filed against the United States Army Corps of Engineers, the federal agency tasked in the Flood Control Act of 1965 to design and build the protective levees and floodwalls for New Orleans. However, federal judge Stanwood R. Duval, Jr, dismissed the case on February 1, 2008 stating that while the Army Corps was responsible for the design and construction errors in the flood protection, it could not be held financially liable due to provisions in the Flood Control Act of 1928 which holds the Army Corps immune.

On August 2, 2007, a judge ruled that some insurance companies were not liable for the damages sustained during Katrina.

=== Greater New Orleans Urban Water Plan ===
The Greater New Orleans Urban Water Plan (UWP) is a collaborative, multibillion dollar post-Katrina redevelopment plan for the New Orleans metropolitan area. Originally released in 2013, the UWP is the result of collaborative efforts among Greater New Orleans, Inc., local civic leaders, and stormwater management experts. Waggonner & Ball Architects, a private firm based in New Orleans, coordinated the project with the support of Greater New Orleans, Inc. The project sought to rethink New Orleans's stormwater management and drainage infrastructure to ensure the city's longevity amidst subsidence and climate change concerns. Additionally, a major component of the project was the revitalization and economic development of areas within the city that had been severely impacted by the hurricane. In November 2013, Waggonner & Ball produced the UWP in three parts: Vision, Urban Design, and Implementation.

Waggonner & Ball coined the term "living with water" to describe the UWP's emphasis on storing and holding water within the city limits rather than pumping water out into major waterways, such as the Mississippi River and Lake Pontchartrain. The project views water as an asset and draws upon the Dutch model for flood control in the Netherlands. The plan relies on green infrastructure practices, such as bioswales, greenways, blueways, rain gardens, and permeable pavement, to capture and store excess stormwater. The project is divided among the Jefferson–Orleans basin, the Orleans East Basin, and the St. Bernard Basin, and is a coordinated effort among Jefferson, Orleans, and St. Bernard Parishes. Waggonner & Ball estimates that fully implementing the UWP would cost $6.2 billion with long-term projected benefits of $22 billion, whereas maintaining the pre-Katrina infrastructure model would cost New Orleans more than $10 billion over the next few decades.

The project has served as a primary guide for the New Orleans City Council's Capital Improvement Plan since the adoption of the 2020–2024 Capital Improvement Plan in September 2019 under Mayor LaToya Cantrell.

=== Businesses ===
Bars were the first businesses to reopen in many areas; two remained open in the French Quarter even during the worst of the storm and the official mandatory evacuation. Most other businesses, such as gas stations, appliance stores, and supermarkets, followed somewhat later as they required more work before they could reopen. Three months after the storm, most open restaurants were serving food and drink in disposable plates and cups because of the shortage of dishwashers. Despite many restaurants offering wages double pre-Katrina levels for dishwashers, there were few takers as untrained laborers were able to make more money in demolition- and reconstruction-related industries. Ten months later, things had improved, though there were still labor shortages in many service industries.

Some of the few businesses to do significantly better business after Katrina than before were new car dealers. Flooding totaled an estimated 200,000 vehicles in Metro New Orleans, and dealers able to get in shipments of new cars quickly found customers. After local reporters found a used car dealer selling partially cleaned up flooded cars with restored engines but still soggy trunks, the state legislature quickly passed legislation mandating that cars declared totaled must be dismantled, crushed, or otherwise disposed of and could not be resold.

=== Tourism and events ===
The American Library Association held its annual convention in New Orleans in June 2006; the estimated 18,000 attendees represented the first citywide convention in New Orleans since Hurricane Katrina. The National Association of Realtors also held their annual convention in New Orleans bringing 30,000 attendees to the city in November 2006. The HIMSS healthcare information technology convention and the American College of Cardiology convention, both held in the spring of 2007, each had more than 24,000 attendees. The Essence Music Festival returned to the Crescent City in July 2007 after being displaced to Houston in 2006. Several national travel guides have once again listed New Orleans as one of the top five places to visit in the country.

The Bayou Classic, the traditional football game between Southern University and Grambling State University, returned in November 2006 after being displaced to Houston for its 2005 game. The National Football League made a commitment to the city with the return of the New Orleans Saints, following speculation about a move to San Antonio or Los Angeles. The National Basketball Association has made a commitment with the return of the New Orleans Hornets (now the Pelicans), which played in both New Orleans and Oklahoma City, in the 2005–2006 and 2006–2007 seasons, returning fully for the 2007–2008 season. (Oklahoma City became a permanent member of the NBA in the 2007–2008 season.) New Orleans was granted the 2008 NBA All Star Game, which usually generates millions of dollars in revenue for the host city. Tulane University hosted the first and second rounds of the 2007 NCAA Men's Division I Basketball Championship. The Hornets were renamed to the Pelicans before the 2013–2014 season, and the former name was reclaimed by the then–Charlotte Bobcats the next season. In mid-March 2007, a local group of investors began conducting a study to see if the city could support a Major League Soccer team.

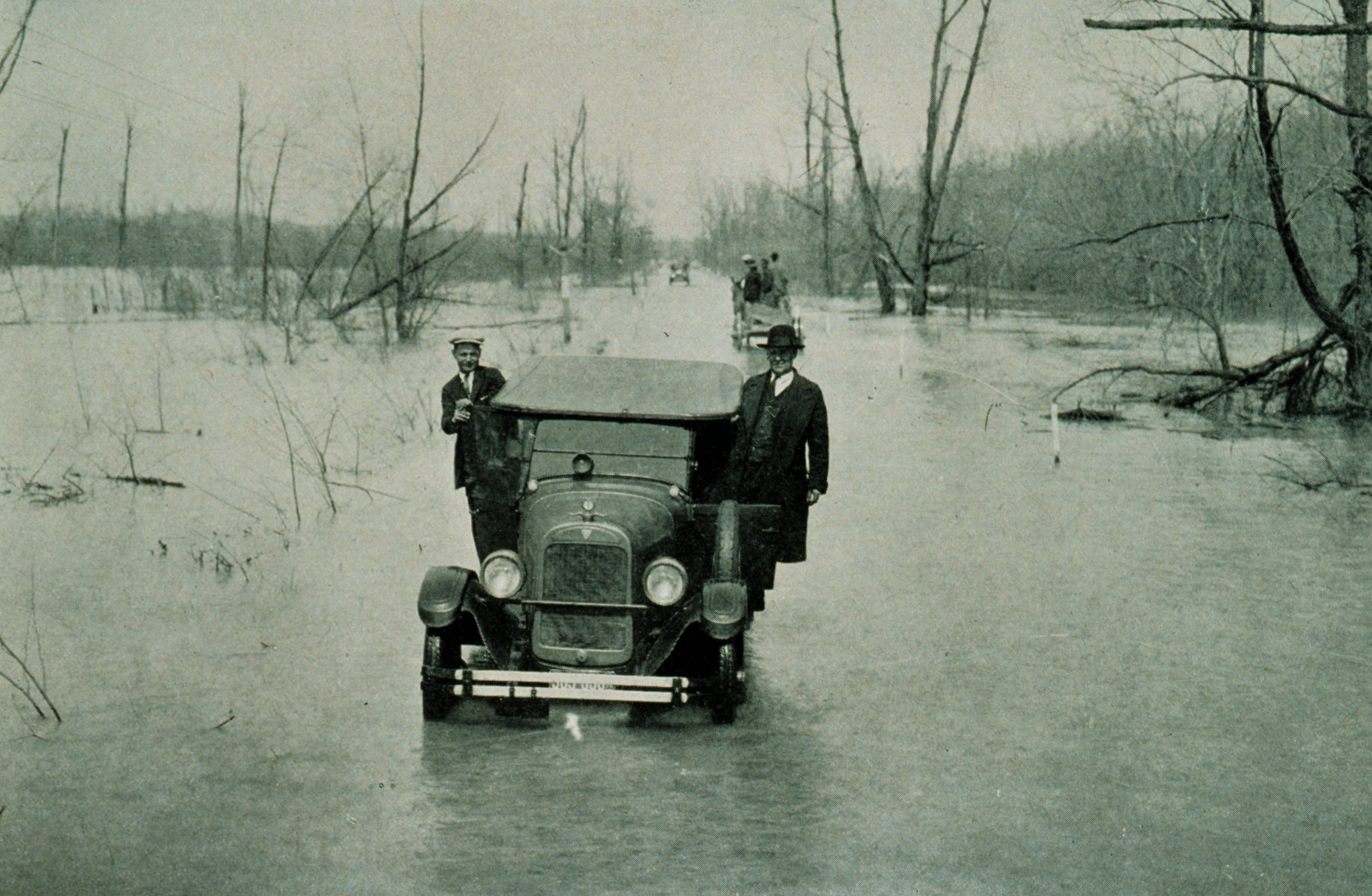
A car in the middle of the Great Mississippi Flood 1927.

== Repopulation ==
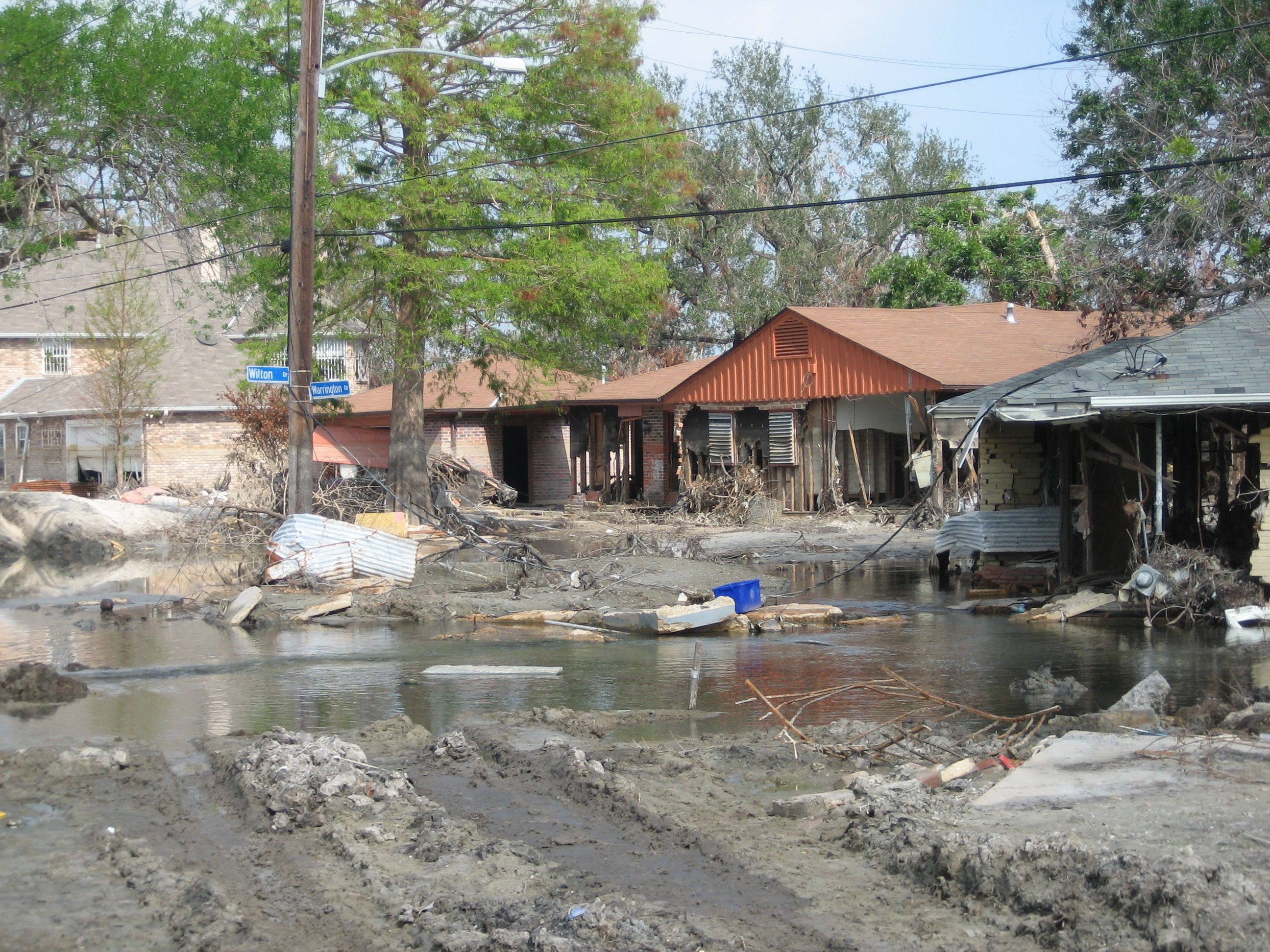
The corner of Wilton Drive and Warrington Drive, November 2005

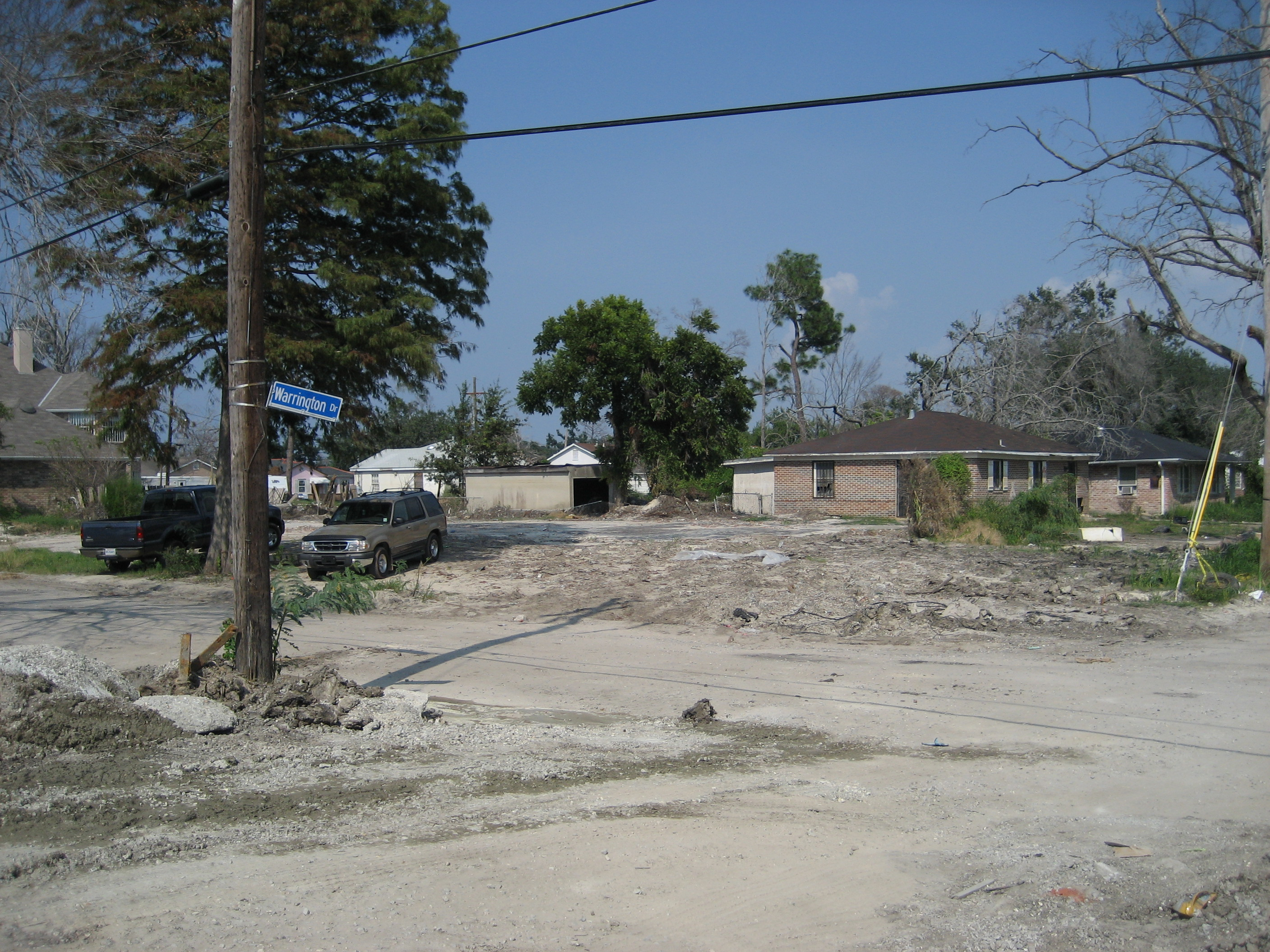
The same corner, September 2006

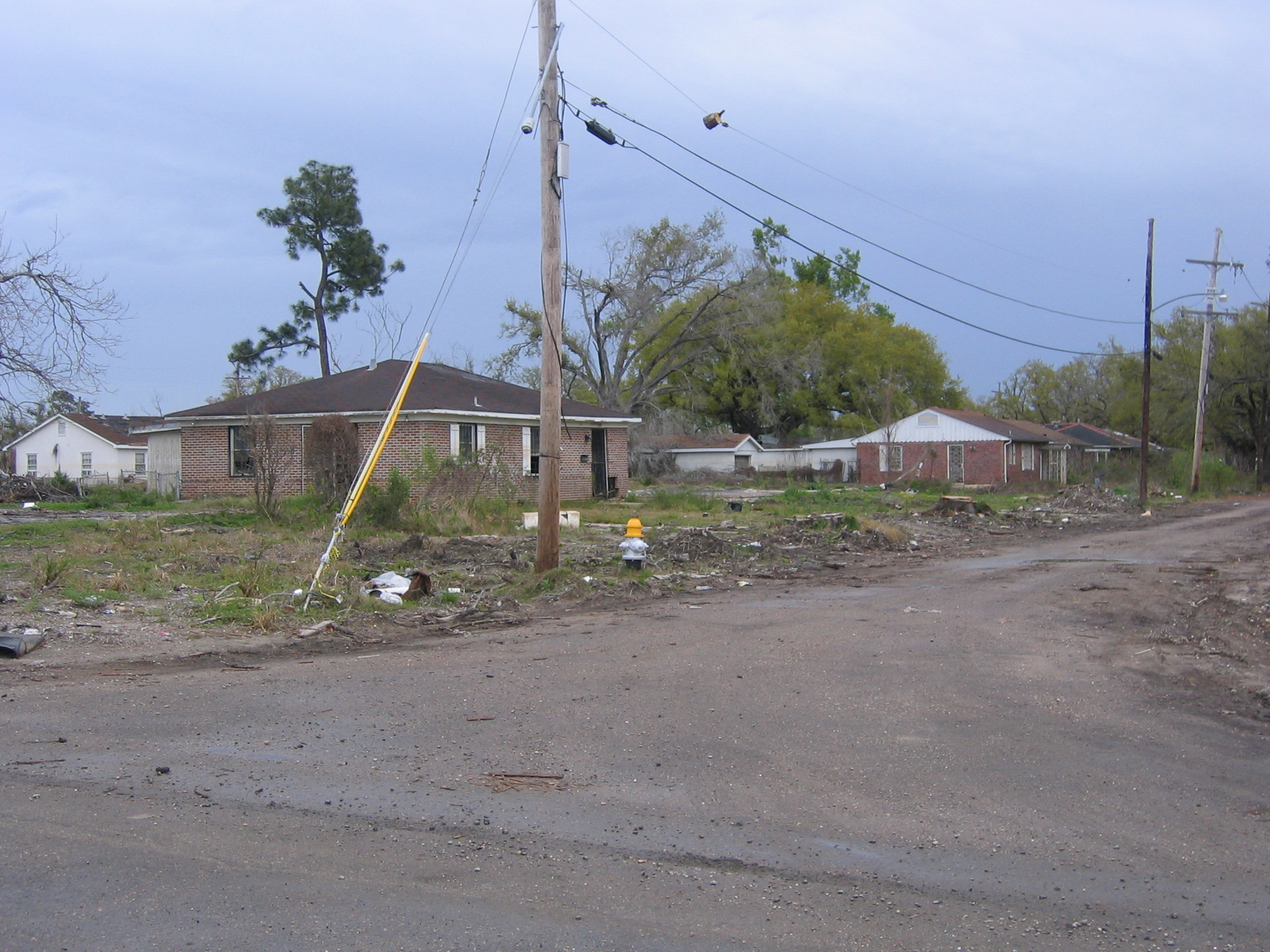
The same corner, March 2007

Repopulating the city has been steady but gradual, with neither the rapid return of most evacuees hoped for by some optimists nor the long term "ghost town" desertion of the city feared by some pessimists. In early 2006, the RAND Corporation estimated that, even in 2008, the city's population would only be little more than half what it was before the storm hit; however by July 2007 the city's population was estimated at about two-thirds (or close to 300,000 residents) of that before the disaster.

Flooded-out areas presented more problems. The city had no comprehensive plan for what to do about flooded areas. Thousands of property owners have been gutting and repairing their property, some in the lowest lying areas of town. Contractors and workers from out-of-state and other countries came in great numbers doing demolition and reconstruction work, some filling hotels and rental property, others living in trailers and tent cities set up in city parks and parking lots. Sportscaster Mike Tirico incorrectly generalized on Monday Night Football in September 2006, some areas, like the Lower Ninth Ward and Gentilly, still looked as badly damaged as the day the storm passed through. However, in each of those neighborhoods thousands of truckloads of debris were removed, hundreds of unsalvageable houses demolished, and work on gutting and repairs has been constant since the city has reopened.

While the evacuation prior to Katrina using contraflow lane reversal was the most successful rapid evacuation of a major city in the history of the United States, too little attention was paid to those with a car, credit cards, road experience and/or family out of town. Mainly due to their poverty, these residents lacked the resources to relocate somewhere else, or even the resources to evacuate the city. Therefore there was a great inequity in who was able to evacuate the city and who was forced to stay.

The U.S. Army Corps of Engineers set up the "Blue Roof Program" of putting blue tarps over damaged roofs. The tarps kept out rain until more permanent roof repairs could be made. Thousands of blue tarps were seen throughout the city; however, a number of official restrictions meant some residents were unable to benefit from this recovery program. Likewise, a number of subcontractors paid by the Corps only did "easy" low-pitch one-story roofs, choosing not to return to do more difficult roofs. Some New Orleanians lived for months in homes with sizable holes in their roofs. Among the popular handouts at Red Cross relief stations were 5-gallon buckets, many put to use as rain catchers. Six months after the storm, many of the hastily placed blue roof tarps were in tatters, leaving those homes vulnerable again. Many people did not succeed in getting permanent roof repairs from such reasons as long waiting lists for reliable contractors and waits for insurance payment.

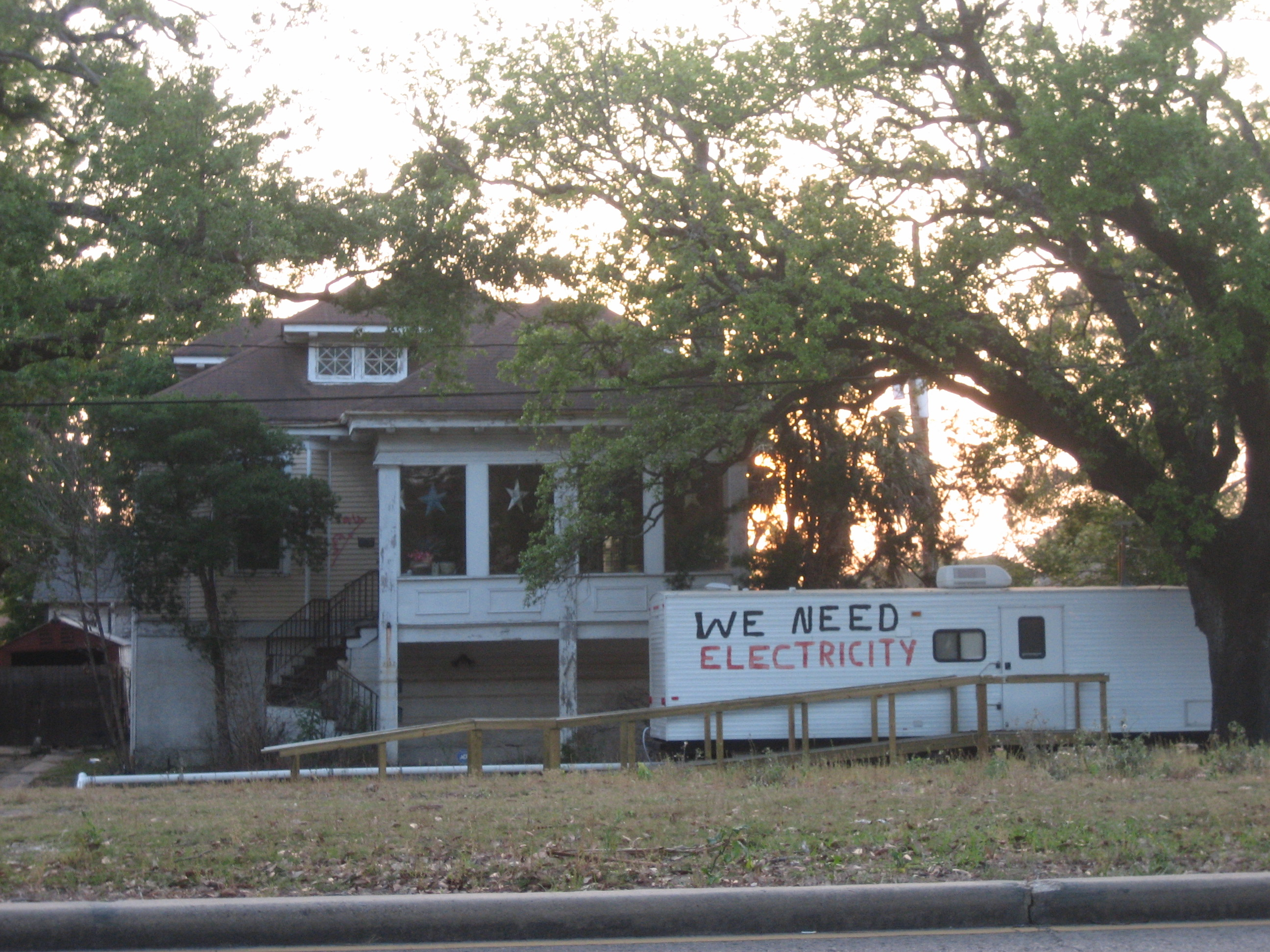
Trailer outside formerly flooded house in Broadmoor has complaint about no electricity painted on side; April 3, 2006

Seven months after the storm, two-thirds of the requested FEMA trailers (designed for short term emergency housing immediately after a disaster) had been delivered. Many of these trailers, however, could not be occupied or, if occupied, were not properly functional. Delays of weeks or months in hooking up electricity and water to trailers were common, and mechanical and bureaucratic problems prevented use of the trailers.

In June 2006, the State of Louisiana finally awarded a contract to DRC, Inc. of Mobile, Alabama to remove thousands of abandoned cars strewn throughout New Orleans after Hurricane Katrina.

=== Green Dot Map ===
On January 11, 2006, the local newspaper, The Times-Picayune ran an article describing a post-disaster map for rebuilding the city, dubbed the Green Dot Map. It was proposed by the Urban Planning Committee as part of the Bring New Orleans Back Commission convened by Mayor Ray Nagin to guide reconstruction. An earlier version of the map discussed parks in many neighborhoods with improved drainage. That version contained green dots drawn with dashed lines and no fill that were intended to be possibilities.

A second map, the one first revealed to the public, was created by the Times-Picayune staff. The new map condensed several maps into one, and also filled in the dashed green circles to make solid ones. Instead of tentative areas for parks and drainage, the new map communicated definite greenspaces that appeared to wipe out entire neighborhoods. Additionally, the green dots were in low and middle income neighborhoods, and not in highest income ones. The Green Dot Map is regarded as a catalyst for transforming New Orleans from a top-down approach to a bottom-up community-driven approach.

=== Rebuilding, social justice, and community life ===
Residents were authorized to return to examine homes after the storm on Monday, September 5, 2005. In downtown New Orleans, several places were indeed producing power. Due to contaminated water and uninhabitable conditions, the Mayor ordered that all citizens be evacuated by September 6. Frederic Schwartz, the architect selected by the citizens of New Orleans and the New Orleans City Planning Commission to replan one-third of the city for 40% of its population explained how the opportunity for rebuilding the city could be a chance to strengthen social justice and community life:

The planning of cities in the face of disaster (natural and political) must reach beyond the band-aid of short-term recovery. Disaster offers a unique opportunity to rethink the planning and politics of our metro-regional areas – it is a chance to redefine our cities and to reassert values of environmental care and social justice, of community building and especially of helping the poor with programs for quality, affordable, and sustainable housing.

As lead planners for District 4, the district that includes the "largest concentration of public housing in the city" (Iberville, St. Bernard, Lafitte, and B. W. Cooper), Schwartz challenged his team to make "every effort to involve the residents and the community in the planning effort," while ensuring that the design of the new housing "could maintain the look and feel of surrounding neighborhoods with a mix of both modern interpretation of historic typologies and new urbanist models."

=== Differing circumstances ===
Reconstruction has been easiest and quickest in the areas least damaged by the storm, mostly corresponding to the parts of the city developed before about 1900. These areas were built on naturally higher ground along the River front (such as Old Carrollton, Uptown, the Old Warehouse District, the French Quarter, Old Marigny, and Bywater), along with areas along natural ridges (such as Esplanade Ridge, Bayou St. John, Gentilly Ridge). Most of these older areas had no flooding at all or escaped serious flooding because of the raised design of older architecture which prevented floodwaters from entering homes. Another high area, much of which escaped serious flooding, was the set of Lake Shore developments between Lake Pontchartrain and Robert E. Lee Boulevard, built at a higher level than nearby land from mid-20th century dredging. Due to the direction of the storm and the movement of storm surge, the West Bank section of the city, Algiers was spared flooding and became the first part of the city itself to officially reopen to residents.

Reconstruction of each section of the area has been addressed in the Army Corps LACPR Final Technical Report which identifies areas to not be rebuilt and areas buildings need to be elevated. The Technical Report includes locations of possible new levees; suggested existing levee modifications; "Inundation Zones"; "Water depths less than 14 feet, Raise-In-Place of Structures"; "Water depths greater than 14 feet, Buyout of Structures"; "Velocity Zones"; and "Buyout of Structures" areas for five different scenarios. The Corps of Engineers will submit the report to Congress for consideration, planning, and response in mid-2009.

After the storm, residents began repopulating the city, and with that came more inequity. During this rebuilding period of New Orleans a larger percentage of White residents returned back to the city than did Black residents. This was attributed to the fact White neighborhoods, like Lakeview, bounced back a lot faster than most Black neighborhoods, like the Ninth Ward. This is in part because of the length of time to get utilities like water and electricity working in these communities; reliance on public transit and public schools; and the lack of flood insurance. Furthermore, White people returning to New Orleans at higher rates than Black people was attributed to an unwillingness of planners to rebuild low-income housing. In September 2005, the Washington Post noted former 10-term Republican Congressman Richard H. Baker from Baton Rouge reportedly told lobbyists, "We finally cleaned up public housing in New Orleans. We couldn't do it, but God did", and criticized his lack of concern for the lower income residents.

FEMA caseworkers were charged with the responsibility of helping evacuees find housing and employment. Caseworkers had to help some former residents realize that moving back was unrealistic because some of the city was not being rebuilt. This created a diaspora as many evacuees wished to return to New Orleans but were not able to.

Large areas of the city's public housing were targeted for demolition, inciting vocal protests from some, including architecture critic Nicolai Ouroussoff.

=== Homeless residents ===
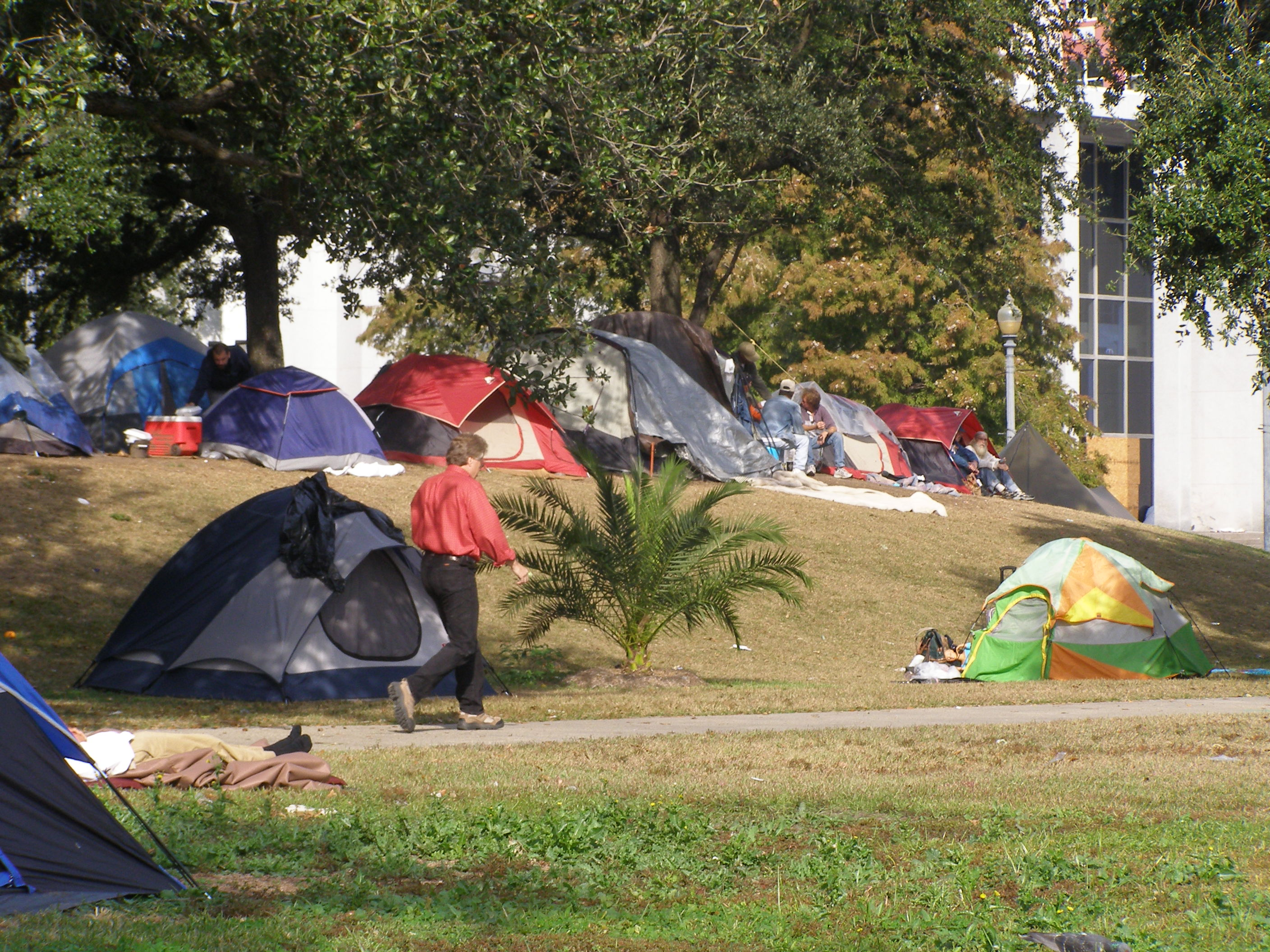
Duncan Plaza Tent Encampment November 2007.

A challenge facing New Orleans was the exceptionally large homeless population created by Katrina. The number of homeless people living in New Orleans doubled to 12,000 people between the hurricane and mid-2007. With a post-Katrina population of 300,000 people, this meant that 1 in 25 people were homeless, an extremely high number and nearly three times that of any other US city. Most of the homeless were Katrina evacuees who returned to higher rents or who fell through the cracks of the federal system that was to provide temporary housing after the disaster. There were also some workers who came from out of state for the post-Katrina rebuilding boom but who subsequently lost their jobs. Compounding this problem, the number of beds for the homeless in the city decreased from a count of 2,800 before the storm to 2,000 as of May 2008.

In January 2009, the New Orleans Legal Assistance Corporation's Homeless Department reevaluated the homelessness rate. They found that the post-Katrina homeless population decreased by 64% since the last survey two years prior.

UNITY of Greater New Orleans reported 1,188 homeless people after their 2018 Point-in-Time count performed in January. As of 2018, New Orleans has maintained a "functional zero" in veteran homelessness for three years. Going forward, UNITY's efforts are focused on support for chronically homeless people with physical and/or mental disabilities.

=== Neighborhood and community-based organizations ===
Neighborhood and community-based organizations played a significant role in the reconstruction effort after Katrina. Neighborhood associations and resident-leaders from communities across the city established an information-sharing network called the Neighborhoods Partnership Network (NPN) where they shared lessons learned through the rebuilding process with each other as well as information about important upcoming citywide or neighborhood planning meetings, resources (on volunteers, tools, programs and application processes, etc.), and calls and offers for help and collaboration. Network members shared information and resources identified through the network with their own communities and neighbors. Early on, members also used NPN as a way to identify and collectively point out issues and collective priorities to local government officials and agencies and propose possible solutions. The network eventually established a newspaper, The Trumpet, that was circulated locally to disseminate information, highlight and celebrate progress, and to facilitate connections for collaboration.

=== Relief agencies ===
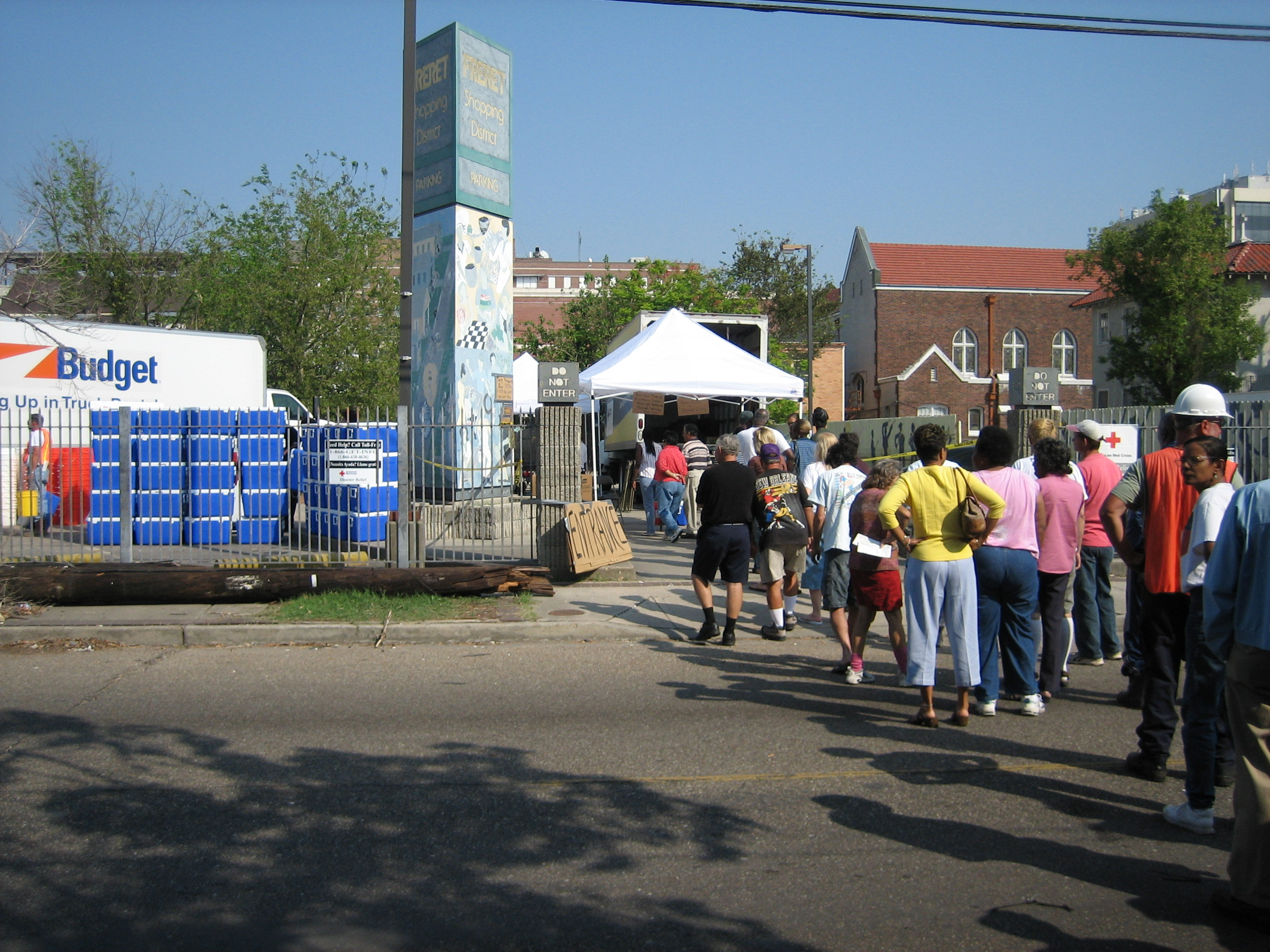
Lining up at a Red Cross food & supply center in a formerly flooded Uptown neighborhood, mid-October 2005

Initially, a total of 63,000 troops added in the relief effort - 18,000 active-duty troops and 45,000 National Guard. The American Red Cross made a belated but nonetheless significant entry into the city in mid-September; and by the start of October had a number of relief centers set up around the city. These provided hot meals, packaged food, bottled water and other supplies like diapers, mops, and dust masks. The Salvation Army also had many stations giving food. Temporary free clinics provided some medical care. Towards the end of 2005, the relief centers were wound down, starting with those in functioning parts of the city. Red Cross meals continued at a much smaller scale into 2006 from trucks traveling around the worst-hit and poorest neighborhoods.

The Southern Baptist Convention sent feeding units to New Orleans and the Mississippi Gulf Coast the day after Katrina struck New Orleans. Since this time, the Southern Baptist Convention through its North American Mission Board established an ongoing project called Operation Noah Rebuild, (not to be confused with the Operation Noah sponsored by the City of New Orleans) which has hosted thousands of volunteers and teams from all over the United States. The volunteer teams helped in the reconstruction efforts in New Orleans and the surrounding parishes. First Baptist Church of New Orleans worked hand-in-hand with Habitat for Humanity with the Baptist Crossroads Project, in an effort to rebuild homes in the Upper Ninth Ward.

Common Ground Collective had two relief centers in the Ninth Ward of New Orleans, providing food, clothing, and a tool library. The larger center was in the Upper 9th Ward, with a smaller one in the worst hit part of the Lower 9th Ward. They also helped gutting houses.

The Church of Jesus Christ of Latter-day Saints began bringing in load after load of food and water for local members and residents to several areas of the city. Thousands of church members came in on rotating weekends to help clean up debris, gut houses and cut up fallen trees all over the city. In addition to the home repairs, the church full-time counselors were available to provide mental health assistance; and church employment centers—offices that aid with finding jobs—opened their doors to everyone, regardless of religion.

Habitat for Humanity has been active in building homes at an accelerated pace since the storm. Initially, the organization had volunteers gutting homes; but since returned to its primary mission of fighting poverty housing. Catholic Charities also was very active with volunteers repairing damaged houses and churches throughout the area. Camp Hope in Violet, Louisiana housed volunteers in the Hurricane Katrina recovery effort of St. Bernard Parish since June 1, 2006.

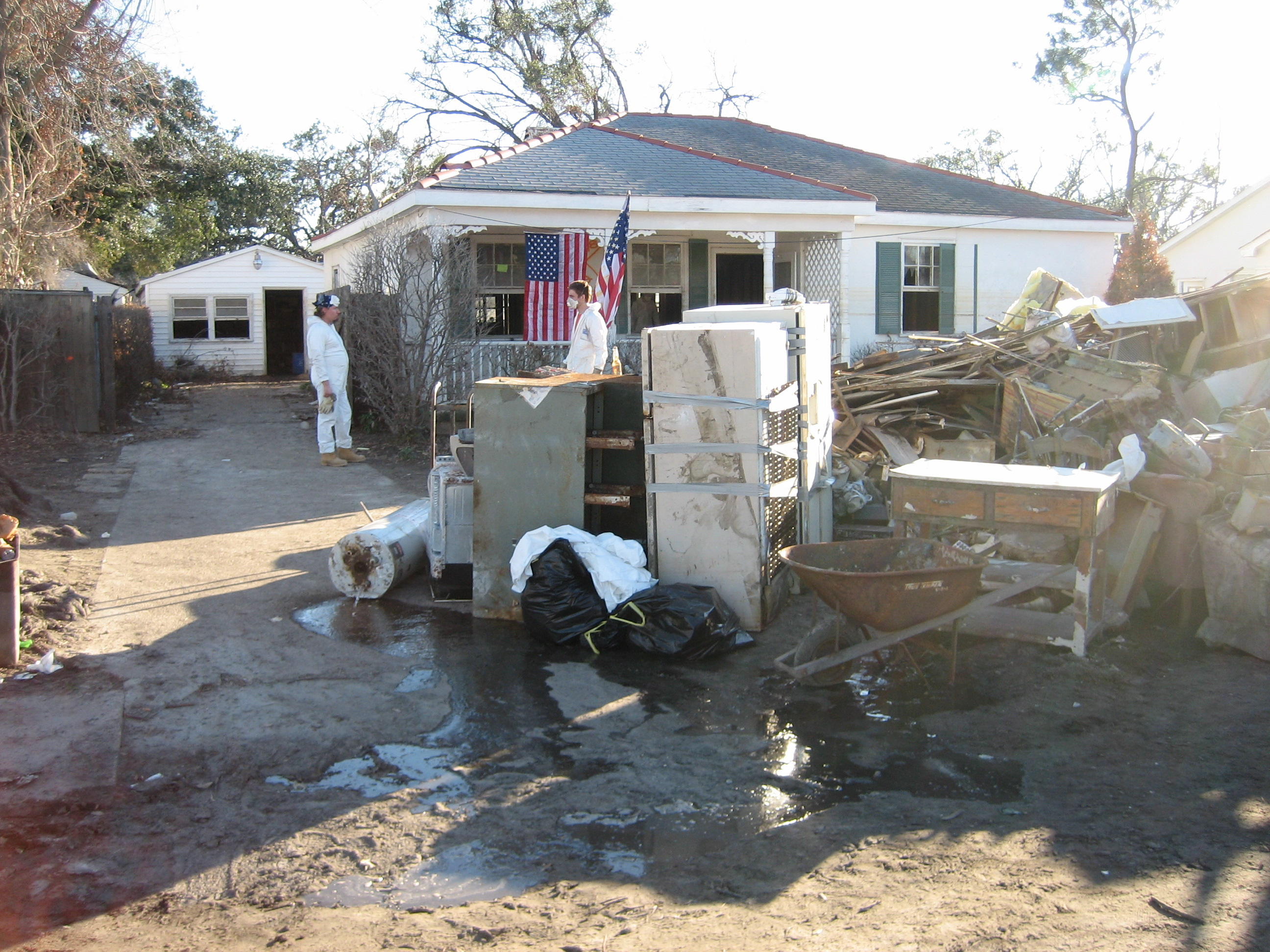
Clearing out trashed possessions and gutting flood damaged home, Gentilly neighborhood, January 2006.

The Jazz Foundation of America is a non-profit organization that helped New Orleans musicians directly by paying the first month's rent for new homes, getting nearly $250,000 worth of donated instruments to musicians, giving pro bono counseling, advocacy, legal counseling, and creating a long term employment program that put displaced musicians back to work performing free concerts in schools and nursing homes, in eight states. In 2005 The foundation held an auction to benefit musicians affected by Hurricane Katrina Thanks to the generosity of the foundation's chairwoman, Ms. Agnes Varis, they were able to create employment programs which have made it possible to keep the artists and their music alive in New Orleans.

Lieutenant Governor Mitch Landrieu (who later became Mayor of New Orleans) declared that Louisiana housed America's soul, and its revival was of paramount importance. As New Orleans began reviving its local businesses, the reestablishment of the city's restaurants, particularly mom and pop eateries, received fervent local and national support. New Orleans's cuisine has largely maintained its cultural distinctiveness, linking its citizens with the city's creole roots. Long before Hurricane Katrina, 'local' food in New Orleans represented a framework for discussing America's racial binary—a paradigm in which the city has generally attempted to resist. Thus, even if race prevented a portion of New Orleanians from "[acknowledging] that they do, indeed, share one culture", culture became recognized as "something shared around which the city's residents could rally" during an arduous rebuild. By emphasizing the restoration of not only New Orleans's economic but also its cultural capital, the city yielded the additional benefit of a reinvigorated social capital.

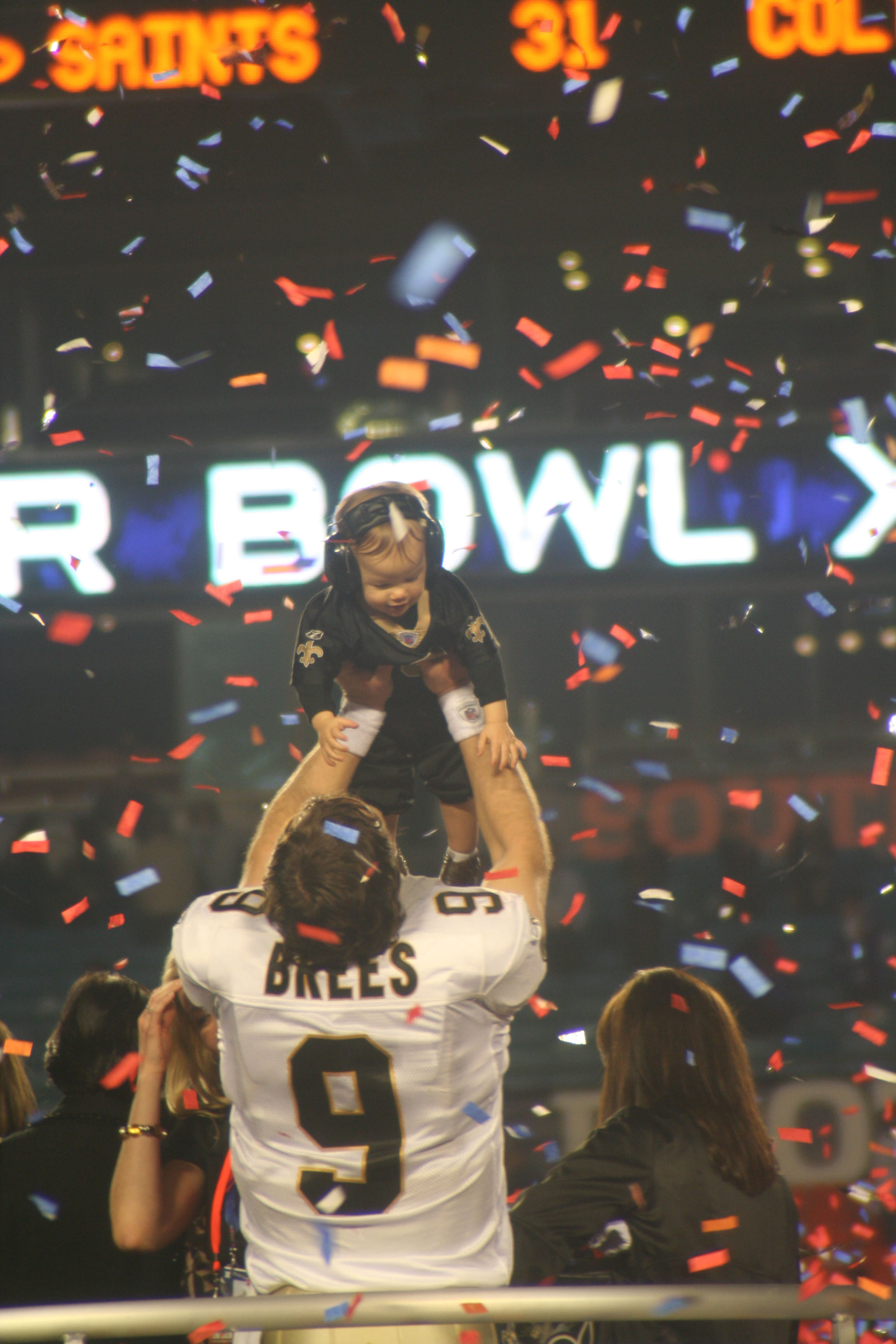
Drew Brees holding up his son after winning Super Bowl XLIV.

== Conspiracy theories ==
Nation of Islam leader Louis Farrakhan among other public figures claimed the levees were dynamited to divert waters away from wealthy white areas. The conspiracy theory reached a United States House of Representatives committee investigating Katrina when a New Orleans community activist made the claim. According to the New Orleans Times Picayune this is an "urban myth". Reasons for belief in these theories have been ascribed to the decision by city officials during the Great Mississippi Flood of 1927 to set off 30 tons of dynamite on the levee at Caernarvon, Louisiana which eased pressure on levees at New Orleans but flooded St. Bernard Parish, the Ninth Ward taking the brunt of the city's flooding during Hurricane Betsy, the general disenfranchisement of blacks and lower-class people, and the similarity of the sound of the levees collapsing to that of a bombing.

== See also ==
- U.S. Army Corps of Engineers civil works controversies
- U.S. Army Corps of Engineers civil works controversies (New Orleans)
- Flood Control Act of 1965
- 17th Street Canal
- Drainage in New Orleans
- Hurricane Katrina
- Hurricane Rita
- ING 4727
- Industrial Canal
- Inner Harbor Navigation Canal (IHNC) Seabrook Floodgate Structure
- London Avenue Canal
- Civil engineering and infrastructure repair in New Orleans after Hurricane Katrina
- Investigations of levee failures during Hurricane Katrina
- Gulf Coast Civic Works Act
- IHNC Lake Borgne Surge Barrier
- Musicians' Village
- Seabrook Floodgate
