= Gulf Coast Civic Works Act =

- Long title: A bill to establish the Gulf Coast Recovery Authority to administer a Gulf Coast Civic Works Project to provide job-training opportunities and increase employment to aid in the recovery of the Gulf Coast region.
- Announced in: the 110th United States Congress

Legislative history
- Introduced in the House as H.R. 4048 by Rep. Zoe Lofgren (D–CA) on November 1, 2007; Committee consideration by House Education and Labor

The Gulf Coast Civic Works Bill was a bill introduced in the US Congress in 2007 as H.R. 4048, intended to establish a regional authority to fund resident-led recovery projects. It died in committee and was reintroduced in edited form in 2009, again dying in committee.

The bill was advocated by a non-partisan partnership of community, faith, student, labor and human rights organizations, known as the Gulf Coast Civic Works Campaign or Project. This partnership started from the ideas of San Jose State University (SJSU) students Rochelle Smarr and Victor Ly to garner national support for rebuilding efforts following Hurricane Katrina.

== Purposes ==
HR 4048 was to create 100,000 good jobs and training opportunities for local and displaced workers to rebuild infrastructure and restore the environment. The Bill empowers residents to realize their right to return with dignity and safety, revitalizes the local workforce, and helps create more sustainable communities.

If passed, it would do the following:

Rebuilds Vital Public Infrastructure and Restores the Environment

- Rebuilds and repairs public infrastructure including schools, police and fire stations, hospitals, parks, roads, water and sewer systems, and cultural centers
- Builds equitable flood protection and restores the marshes and wetlands
- Serves as a national model for disaster recovery and infrastructure development

Creates Jobs and Provides Job Training

- Creates a minimum of 100,000 jobs and training for Gulf Coast residents
- Creates a Civilian Conservation Corps for youth 17–24 to focus on wetland restoration, forestation, and urban greenery
- Provides 15 grants for artistic projects to highlight Gulf Coast culture and history

Takes Action to Jumpstart Recovery

- Establishes the Gulf Coast Recovery Authority to implement and coordinate the necessary federal response to the devastation of the Gulf Coast
- Coordinates existing federal programs to ensure effective and efficient recovery
- Creates opportunities for local businesses through competitive contract bidding

Spurs Sustainable Community Development

- Allows community groups and officials to determine what projects are needed in local advisory councils
- Focuses benefits on the regional economy through first-source hiring provisions
- Strengthens workforce by providing jobs and needed skills training

Requires Accountability

- Requires oversight and community participation in all recovery projects

== History in U.S. Congress ==
The Gulf Coast Civic Works Act was originally introduced in 2007 to the 110th session of the United States Congress as H.R. 4048 by California Representative Zoe Lofgren. H.R. 4048 called for the establishment of a Gulf Coast Authority to administer the Gulf Coast Civic Works Project. The bill was referred to the Subcommittee on Health, Employment, Labor, and Pensions on January 22, 2008. As the Bill was not passed within the 110th session of Congress, it was "cleared from the books."

On May 6, 2009, the Gulf Coast Civic Works Act was re-introduced to the 111th session of Congress as HR 2269. California Representative Zoe Lofgren is again listed as the main Bill sponsor. H.R. 2269 is an edited version of H.R. 4048 that proposes the establishment of a Gulf Coast Civic Works Commission within the Department of Homeland Security as well as an Office of Federal Coordinator of Gulf Coast Rebuilding to regulate the Gulf Coast Civic Works Project. On June 11, 2009 the Bill was referred to the House Subcommittee on Workforce Protections.

== Public Supporters ==
Public officials from multiple U.S. states supported the project and act:

"I was delighted to hear about Louisiana Winter. I want to thank you all for your efforts to get the Gulf Coast Civic Works Project passed. I am pleased to hear about the strong response from university students signing up to support Louisiana Winter."—Governor Kathleen Babineaux Blanco, Louisiana

"My father-in-law, Sargent Shriver, always told me that serving others was the most gratifying thing anyone can do. During this week, each of you will come to realize the truthfulness of his wisdom. I commend your involvement in this project and your desire to better the lives of your fellow Americans. You are living proof that our country’s future rests in very capable and very charitable hands."—Governor Arnold Schwarzenegger, California

"The areas ravaged by Hurricane Katrina must be a priority for all Americans—in Congress and throughout the United States. It is our moral obligation to acknowledge that there have always been two America’s here in the United States; and Hurricanes Katrina and Rita lifted the curtain on the connection of race and poverty.... I am personally vested in eradicating the poverty across this country-particularly in the Gulf Coast and support increasing funding and job opportunities for our brothers and sisters trying to rebuild their lives."—Congresswoman Barbara Lee, California

"Today's call to action serves as a critical resurgence of attention, compassion, and resources directed toward the residents and displaced of the Gulf Coast. The Louisiana Winter student volunteers will bring a sense of hope and new energy to the rebuilding efforts. There is so much that remains to be done in housing, employment, health care, and education. Only a national effort, fueled by the Gulf Coast Civic Works Project and the employment of tens of thousands of Gulf Coast residents, can bring about the healing and reconstruction of these vital communities. I am very proud of our San Jose State students who will be participating in Louisiana Winter week."—Assemblywoman Sally Lieber, Speaker pro Tempore, California State Assembly

"Mississippians believe that we have worked diligently to put our lives and homes back together following Hurricane Katrina. The volunteers all agree. Now we have the opportunity to prove that on a national scale. The Gulf Coast Civic Works Project can help us remind others that there is still much work to be done and make our area whole again and that we still need the support and volunteerism of others."—Brian Carriere, Gulfport City Council President

"The Gulf Coast Civic Works Project presents a common-sense solution that's as bold and broad as the problem it's trying to solve. In addition to being more efficient than the approaches for rebuilding currently being considered, it represents an investment in the people of the Gulf--not large corporations--and most importantly, it gives survivors the power to rebuild their homes and their lives. ColorOfChange.org is proud to be a supporter of the Gulf Coast Civic Works Project."—James Rucker, Director of Color Of Change
