= Road Home =

Federally funded grant program

Road Home is a program funded by the U.S. government which has provided federal grant money to help Louisiana residents rebuild or sell houses severely damaged by Hurricanes Katrina and Rita. This federally funded program is administered by the State of Louisiana.

== Background ==
According to the Road Home website, as of December 2017, the program had disbursed a total of $9.022 billion in awards to 130,052 individual homeowners in the area, with grants averaging $69,379 each. These are cash grants, not low interest loans, and are received income tax free. They are on top of insurance awards, private or federal, which may have already been received.

Additionally, the program has been extended to provide cash grants to facilitate the elevation of homes in flood prone areas. According to the Road Home web site, "32,389 applicants have received elevation disbursements totaling $942,865,530".

The Road Home Program's local office officially closed in March 2018, however, the program's official website has continued to post Situation and Pipeline reports into July 2021. In addition, the Small Rental Property Program page was updated approximately two months after the Road Home office closure.

== Criticism and legal matters ==
Like Federal Emergency Management Agency (FEMA), Road Home has been the target of criticism. In 2011, a serious settlement was reached between African-American Katrina victims and the U.S. Department of Housing and Urban Development (HUD). The Greater New Orleans Fair Housing Action Center v. HUD brought to light racially discriminatory impacts of the Road Home Program's practical design. This suit alleged that the algorithm used by the program to determine how much money to grant in each case was inherently biased, even if unintentionally. Substantial evidence from the program's own data showed that under this formula, African American homeowners were significantly less likely than white homeowners to receive grants based upon the estimated cost to repair damage. Instead, many African American homeowners were granted money based upon the supposed pre-storm market value of their homes.

Louisiana claimed that if you have received a "Road Home Elevation Incentive" (RHEI) award and have not yet met the compliance terms associated with the award agreement are eligible to have costs considered for re-classification." The State claimed that this is because "the primary goal of the Road Home Program is to enable applicants to return and occupy their homes this policy enables RHEI award amounts that have been used for home repair and reconstruction to be more accurately re-classified as part of the [your] compensation award."

After the local office closed its doors in 2018, financial and legal matters related to the Road Home Program were largely handed over to Shows, Cali & Walsh, L.L.P., the law firm contracted by Louisiana Office of Community Development. As recently as March 2020, Shows, Cali & Walsh, L.L.P. has taken over suing many Road Home Program grant recipients, alleging that the defendants received too much funding or used this funding improperly. As of March 2020, over 800 of these suits have been filed.
