= Dillard, New Orleans =

Dillard
- New Orleans Neighborhood
- Interactive map of Dillard
- Coordinates: 30°00′03″N 90°04′05″W
- Country: United States
- State: Louisiana
- City: New Orleans
- Planning District: District 6, Gentilly District

Area
  - Total: 0.95 sq mi (2.5 km^{2})
  - Land: 0.95 sq mi (2.5 km^{2})
  - Water: 0.00 sq mi (0 km^{2})
- Elevation: 0 ft (0 m)

Population (2010)
  - Total: 4,373
  - Density: 4,600/sq mi (1,800/km^{2})
- Time zone: UTC-6 (CST)
  - Summer (DST): UTC-5 (CDT)
- Area code: 504

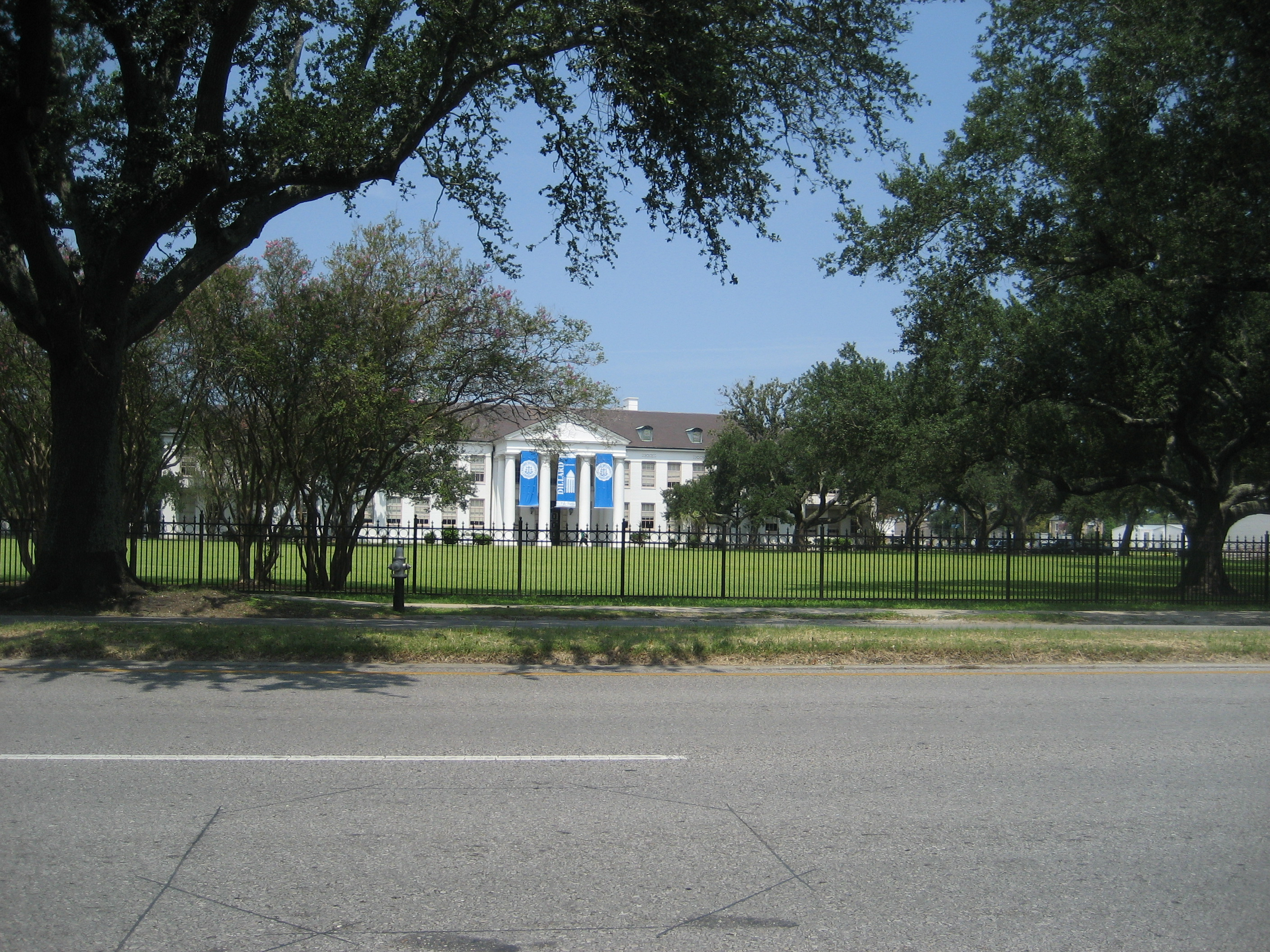
Wikipedia sourced image of Dillard Neighborhood, sub-district of Gentilly district, depicting Dillard University,

Dillard is a neighborhood of the city of New Orleans. A subdistrict of the Gentilly District Area, its boundaries as defined by the City Planning Commission are: Mirabeau Avenue to the north, Elysian Fields Avenue to the east, Benefit Street and I-610 to the south and Paris Avenue, Pratt Drive and the London Avenue Canal to the west.

== Geography ==
Dillard is located at 30°00′03″N 90°04′05″W and has an elevation of 0 feet (0.0 m). According to the United States Census Bureau, the district has a total area of 0.95 square miles (2.5 km^{2}). 0.95 square miles (2.5 km^{2}) of which is land and 0.00 square miles (0.0 km^{2}) (0.0%) of which is water.

=== Adjacent Neighborhoods ===
- St. Anthony (north)
- Gentilly Terrace (east)
- St. Roch (south)
- St. Bernard (west)
- Filmore (west)

=== Boundaries ===
The City Planning Commission defines the boundaries of Dillard as these streets: Mirabeau Avenue, Elysian Fields Avenue, Benefit Street, I-610, Paris Avenue, Pratt Drive and the London Avenue Canal.

== Demographics ==
As of the census of 2000, there were 6,471 people, 2,609 households, and 1,581 families residing in the neighborhood. The population density was 6,812 /mi^{2} (2,588 /km^{2}).

As of the census of 2010, there were 4,373 people, 1,901 households, and 1,051 families residing in the neighborhood.

== See also ==
- New Orleans neighborhoods
- Gentilly, New Orleans
