= Lake Terrace/Lake Oaks, New Orleans =

Lake Terrace/Lake Oaks
- New Orleans Neighborhood
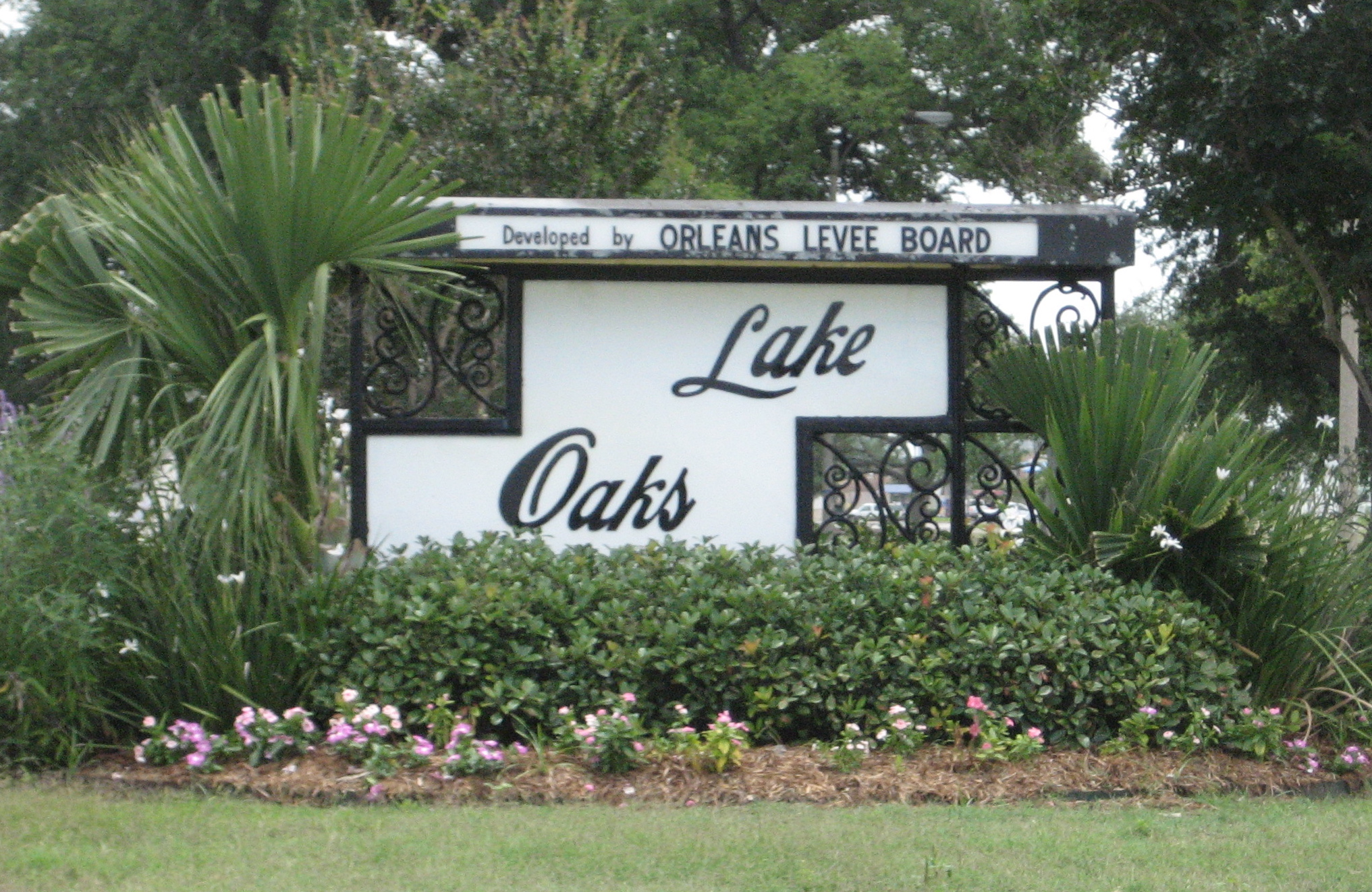
- Lake Oaks sign on Elysian Fields Avenue. Note the "Developed by Orleans Levee Board" heading.
- Interactive map of Lake Terrace/Lake Oaks
- Coordinates: 30°01′41″N 90°03′42″W
- Country: United States
- State: Louisiana
- City: New Orleans
- Planning District: District 6, Gentilly District

Area
  - Total: 18.26 sq mi (47.3 km^{2})
  - Land: 1.51 sq mi (3.9 km^{2})
  - Water: 16.75 sq mi (43.4 km^{2})
- Elevation *All houses were originally built on an elevation of -4 ft.: −7.0 ft (−2.13 m)

Population (2010)
  - Total: 2,168
  - Density: 1,440/sq mi (554/km^{2})
- Time zone: UTC-6 (CST)
  - Summer (DST): UTC-5 (CDT)
- Area code: 504

Lake Terrace/Lake Oaks is a neighborhood of the city of New Orleans, Louisiana. A sub-district of the city's Gentilly District, its boundaries as defined by the City Planning Commission are: Lake Pontchartrain to the north; the Industrial Canal to the east; Leon C. Simon Drive, Elysian Fields Avenue, New York Street, the London Avenue Canal, and Allen Toussaint Boulevard to the south; and Bayou St. John to the west. The neighborhood comprises the Lake Terrace and Lake Oaks subdivisions, the principal campus of the University of New Orleans, and the University of New Orleans Research & Technology Park — all built on land reclaimed from Lake Pontchartrain.

The Lakefront (or lakefront) is a term sometimes used for the larger neighborhood created by the Orleans Levee Board's land-reclamation initiative in early 20th-century New Orleans. It includes Lake Terrace and Lake Oaks, as well as Lakeshore Drive, the lakefront park system, the University of New Orleans, Lake Vista, and Lakeshore. It is considered one of the wealthier areas of the city.

== History ==
This was the original location of Milneburg, whose historic name has been revived by a modern neighborhood somewhat farther south.

Land was reclaimed from Lake Pontchartrain in an Orleans Levee Board project which began in the 1920s and was completed in the 1930s, creating the space now occupied by the neighborhood.

The Pontchartrain Beach amusement park, originally opened within the present-day Lake Terrace subdivision in the 1920s, moved to newly reclaimed land at the foot of Elysian Fields Avenue in the 1930s and remained a popular attraction through the early 1980s. It is now the site of the University of New Orleans Research and Technology Park, home to numerous corporate tenants, the Navy's Space and Naval Warfare Systems Center (SPAWAR) and the UNO Advanced Technology Center office building. The waterfront Lake Terrace Drive and Lake Oaks Park are located in the neighborhood.

During World War II, the area included important war-effort facilities such as Higgins Industries shipyards, Camp Leroy Johnson, and a Naval air base called NAS New Orleans. NAS New Orleans later moved across the Mississippi River to Belle Chasse, and the site of the former naval air station was developed into the principal campus of the University of New Orleans.

After Hurricane Katrina in 2005, while some homes and businesses flooded (especially those on and near Allen Toussaint Boulevard/Leon C. Simon Drive) the majority of the section – like the majority of the lakefront – escaped the disastrous post-Katrina flooding, by virtue of the higher elevation of this man-made land. After Katrina, the lakefront appeared as a slender, curiously undamaged, and almost wholly recovered zone adjacent to the much-lower-lying and hard-hit Lakeview and Gentilly neighborhoods on the other side of Allen Toussaint Boulevard/Leon C. Simon Drive.

== Geography ==
Lake Terrace/Lake Oaks is located at 30°01′41″N 90°03′42″W and has an elevation of 0 feet (0.0 m). According to the United States Census Bureau, the district has a total area of 18.26 square miles (47.3 km^{2}). 1.51 square miles (3.9 km^{2}) of which is land and 16.75 square miles (43.4 km^{2}) (91.73%) of which is water.

Though Lake Terrace, Lake Oaks, and the other Lakefront neighborhoods of Lake Vista and Lakeshore contain numerous fine examples of mid-20th-century modernism, no local or national historic district has been established to bring attention to this unique architectural inventory, or to the noteworthy overall design of New Orleans' Lakefront neighborhood. Lacking local historic district designation to protect the existing built environment from unwarranted demolitions, the mid-20th-century architectural fabric of the Lakefront is being slowly eroded as existing residential structures are torn down to accommodate new construction.

A large traffic circle that meets Paris Ave. East and West Lakeshore Drive, was built shortly after construction of the Lake Terrace. An iconic fountain from 1953 remains in the center of the grassy park intersection. The fountain, a piece of mid-century-modernism has sharp corners that expel up from a large plate-like edge. The fountain remained operational until hurricane Katrina in August 2005. Little was done to repair the fountain, even though reports of mosquito infestations and vandalism surfaced. In particular two unnamed teenagers were taken into custody for a short period for trespassing into the operator's box in 2016. They were released with only a warning the same day. Eventually, in November 2018, the city of New Orleans hired a private company on a contract to repair the fountain. The fountain and the park now receive monthly tendance and repair.

=== Adjacent neighborhoods ===
- Pontchartrain Park (south)
- Milneburg (south)
- St. Anthony (south)
- Dillard (south)
- Lakeshore/Lake Vista (west)

=== Boundaries ===
The City Planning Commission defines the boundaries of Lake Terrace/Lake Oaks as these streets: Lake Pontchartrain, the Industrial Canal, Leon C. Simon Drive, Elysian Fields Avenue, New York Street, the London Avenue Canal and Allen Toussaint Boulevard and Bayou St. John.

== Demographics ==
As of the census of 2000, there were 2,162 people, 689 households, and 526 families residing in the neighborhood. The population density was 1,432 /mi^{2} (5541 /km^{2}).

As of the census of 2010, there were 2,464 people, 982 households, and 544 families residing in the neighborhood.

== Government and infrastructure ==
The Federal Bureau of Investigation operates its New Orleans Field Office in Gentilly, in the Lake Terrace/Lake Oaks area.

== Children's education ==
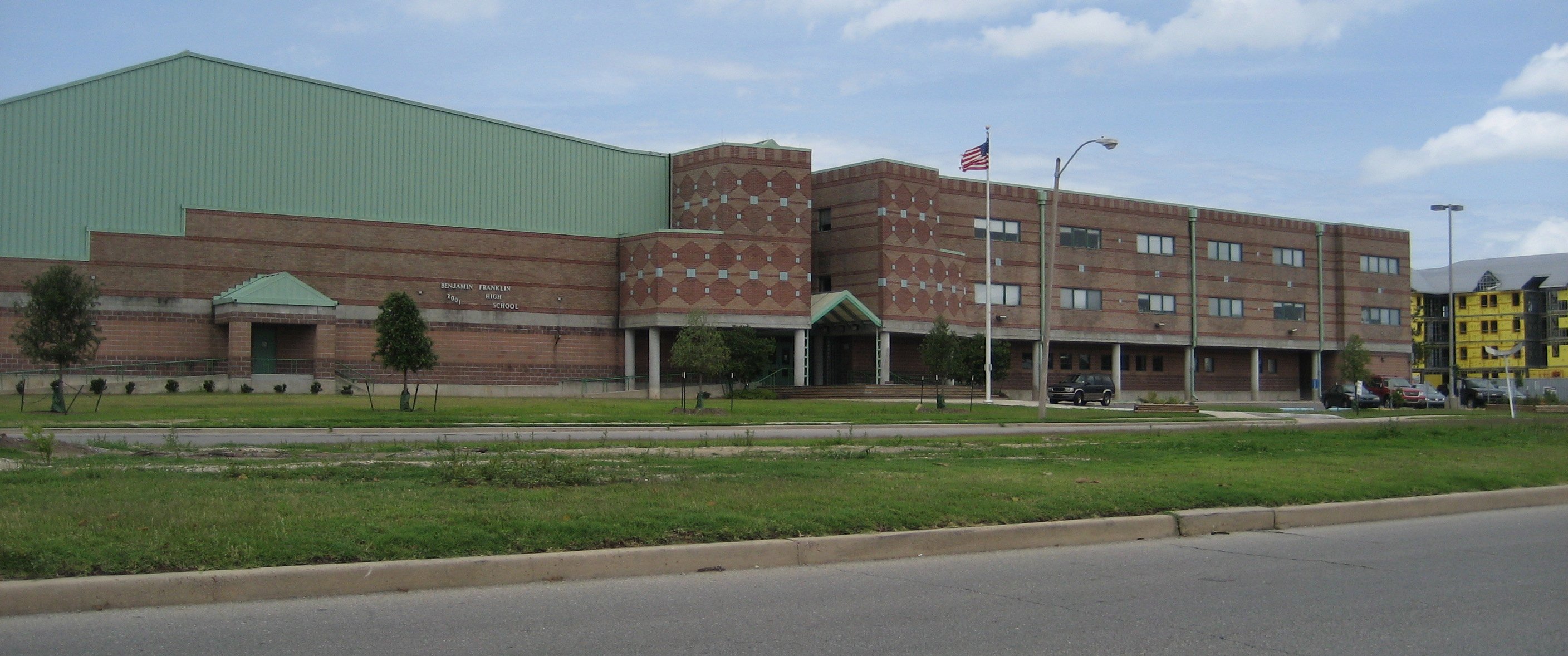
Benjamin Franklin High School

New Orleans Public Schools within the neighborhood are directly administered or supervised (depending on whether the school is a public charter) by either the Orleans Parish School Board (OPSB) or the Recovery School District.

Benjamin Franklin High School, an OPSB-supervised public charter school, is in Lake Terrace/Lake Oaks.

== See also ==
- Neighborhoods in New Orleans
- Gentilly, New Orleans
