= St. Anthony, New Orleans =

St. Anthony
- New Orleans Neighborhood
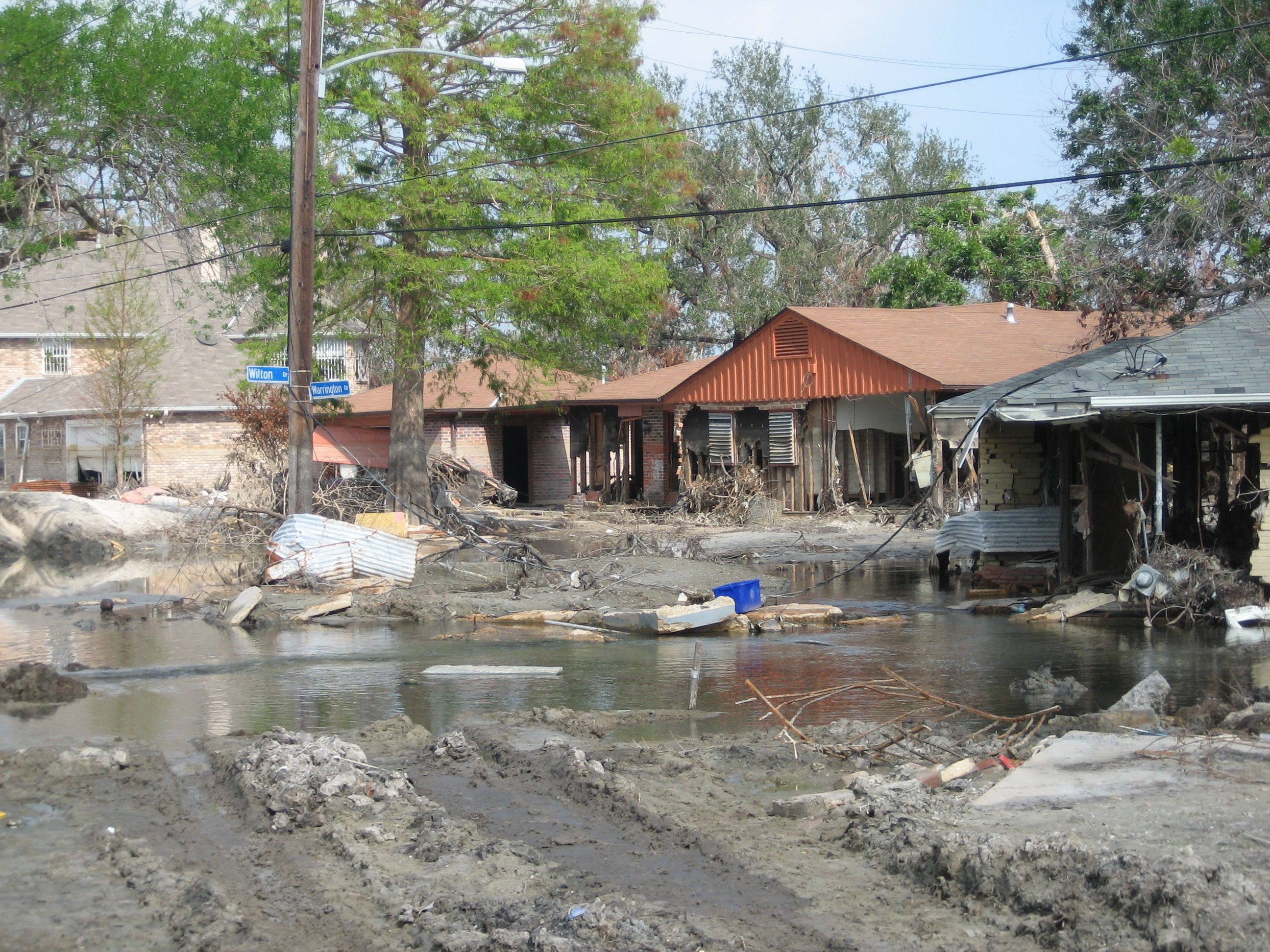
- Some 10 weeks after Hurricane Katrina
- Interactive map of St. Anthony
- Coordinates: 30°00′54″N 90°03′55″W
- Country: United States
- State: Louisiana
- City: New Orleans
- Planning District: District 6, Gentilly District

Area
  - Total: 0.63 sq mi (1.6 km^{2})
  - Land: 0.63 sq mi (1.6 km^{2})
  - Water: 0.00 sq mi (0 km^{2})
- Elevation: 0 ft (0 m)

Population (2010)
  - Total: 1,510
  - Density: 2,400/sq mi (930/km^{2})
- Time zone: UTC-6 (CST)
  - Summer (DST): UTC-5 (CDT)
- Area code: 504

St. Anthony is a neighborhood of the city of New Orleans. A subdistrict of the Gentilly District Area, its boundaries as defined by the City Planning Commission are: New York Street to the north, Elysian Fields Avenue to the east, Mirabeau Avenue to the south and the London Avenue Canal to the west.

The neighborhood is part of the Gentilly section of the city as well as the city's 7th Ward.

The area experienced disastrous flooding at the end of August 2005 from a levee failure on the London Avenue Canal during Hurricane Katrina.

== Geography ==
St. Anthony is located at 30°00′54″N 90°03′55″W and has an elevation of 0 feet (0.0 m). According to the United States Census Bureau, the district has a total area of 0.63 square miles (1.6 km^{2}). 0.63 square miles (1.6 km^{2}) of which is land and 0.00 square miles (0.0 km^{2}) (0.0%) of which is water.

=== Adjacent Neighborhoods ===
- Lake Terrace/Lake Oaks (north)
- Milneburg (east)
- Gentilly Terrace (east)
- Dillard (south)
- Filmore (west)

=== Boundaries ===
The City Planning Commission defines the boundaries of St. Anthony as these streets: New York Street, Elysian Fields Avenue, Mirabeau Avenue and the London Avenue Canal.

== Demographics ==
As of the census of 2000, there were 5,318 people, 2,233 households, and 1,360 families residing in the neighborhood. The population density was 8,441 /mi^{2} (3,324 /km^{2}).

As of the census of 2010, there were 3,510 people, 1,430 households, and 868 families residing in the neighborhood.

== See also ==
- New Orleans neighborhoods
- Gentilly, New Orleans
