= Filmore, New Orleans =

Neighborhood in New Orleans, Louisiana, United States

Filmore
- New Orleans Neighborhood
- Interactive map of Filmore
- Coordinates: 30°00′41″N 90°04′40″W
- Country: United States
- State: Louisiana
- City: New Orleans
- Planning District: District 6, Gentilly District

Area
  - Total: 1.24 sq mi (3.2 km^{2})
  - Land: 1.19 sq mi (3.1 km^{2})
  - Water: 0.05 sq mi (0.13 km^{2})
- Elevation: 0 ft (0 m)

Population (2010)
  - Total: 1,686
  - Density: 1,420/sq mi (547/km^{2})
- Time zone: UTC-6 (CST)
  - Summer (DST): UTC-5 (CDT)
- Area code: 504

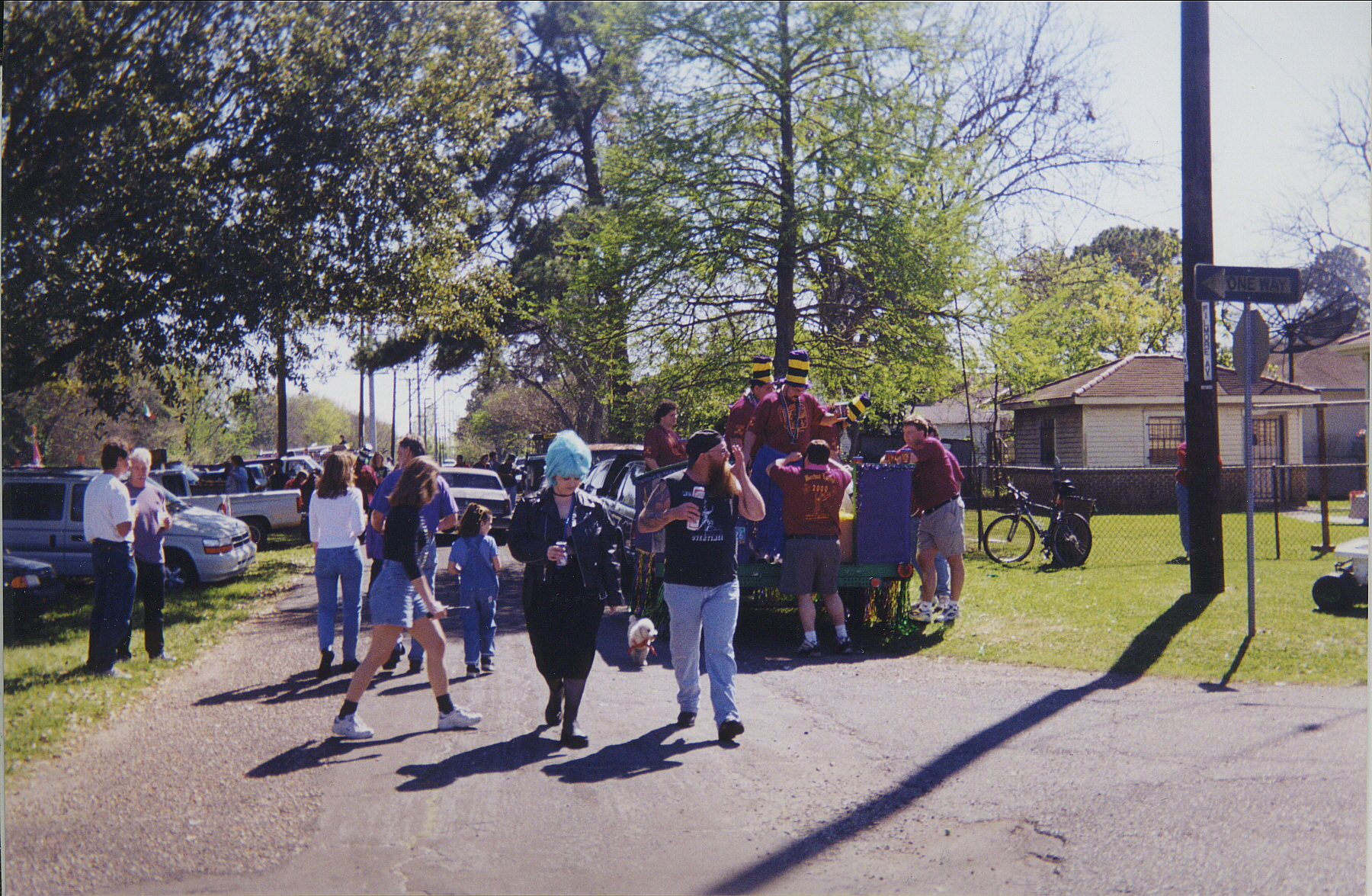
Image of Gentilly Neighborhood.

Filmore is a neighborhood of the city of New Orleans. A subdistrict of the Gentilly District Area, its boundaries as defined by the City Planning Commission are: Allen Toussaint Boulevard to the north, London Avenue Canal to the east, Press Drive, Paris Avenue and Harrison Avenue to the south and Bayou St. John to the west.

== Geography ==
Filmore is located at 30°00′41″N 90°04′40″W and has an elevation of 0 feet (0.0 m). According to the United States Census Bureau, the district has a total area of 1.24 square miles (3.2 km^{2}). 1.19 square miles (3.1 km^{2}) of which is land and 0.05 square miles (0.1 km^{2}) (4.03%) of which is water.

=== Adjacent Neighborhoods ===
- Lake Terrace/Lake Oaks (north)
- St. Anthony (east)
- Dillard (east)
- St. Bernard Projects (south)
- City Park (west)

=== Boundaries ===
The City Planning Commission defines the boundaries of Filmore as these streets: * Allen Toussaint Boulevard, London Avenue Canal, Press Drive, Paris Avenue, Harrison Avenue and Bayou St. John.

== Demographics ==
As of the census of 2000, there were 6,983 people, 2,757 households, and 1,892 families residing in the neighborhood. The population density was 5,868 /mi^{2} (2,253 /km^{2}).

As of the census of 2010, there were 4,227 people, 1,654 households, and 1,087 families residing in the neighborhood.

== See also ==
- New Orleans neighborhoods
- Gentilly, New Orleans
