= Milneburg, New Orleans =

Milneburg Milne Gentilly
- New Orleans neighborhood
- Interactive map of Milneburg
- Coordinates: 30°01′09″N 90°03′12″W
- Country: United States
- State: Louisiana
- City: New Orleans
- Planning District: District 6, Gentilly District

Area
  - Total: 0.73 sq mi (1.9 km^{2})
  - Land: 0.73 sq mi (1.9 km^{2})
  - Water: 0.00 sq mi (0 km^{2})
- Elevation: 0 ft (0 m)

Population (2010)
  - Total: 1,450
  - Density: 2,000/sq mi (770/km^{2})
- Time zone: UTC-6 (CST)
  - Summer (DST): UTC-5 (CDT)
- Area code: 504

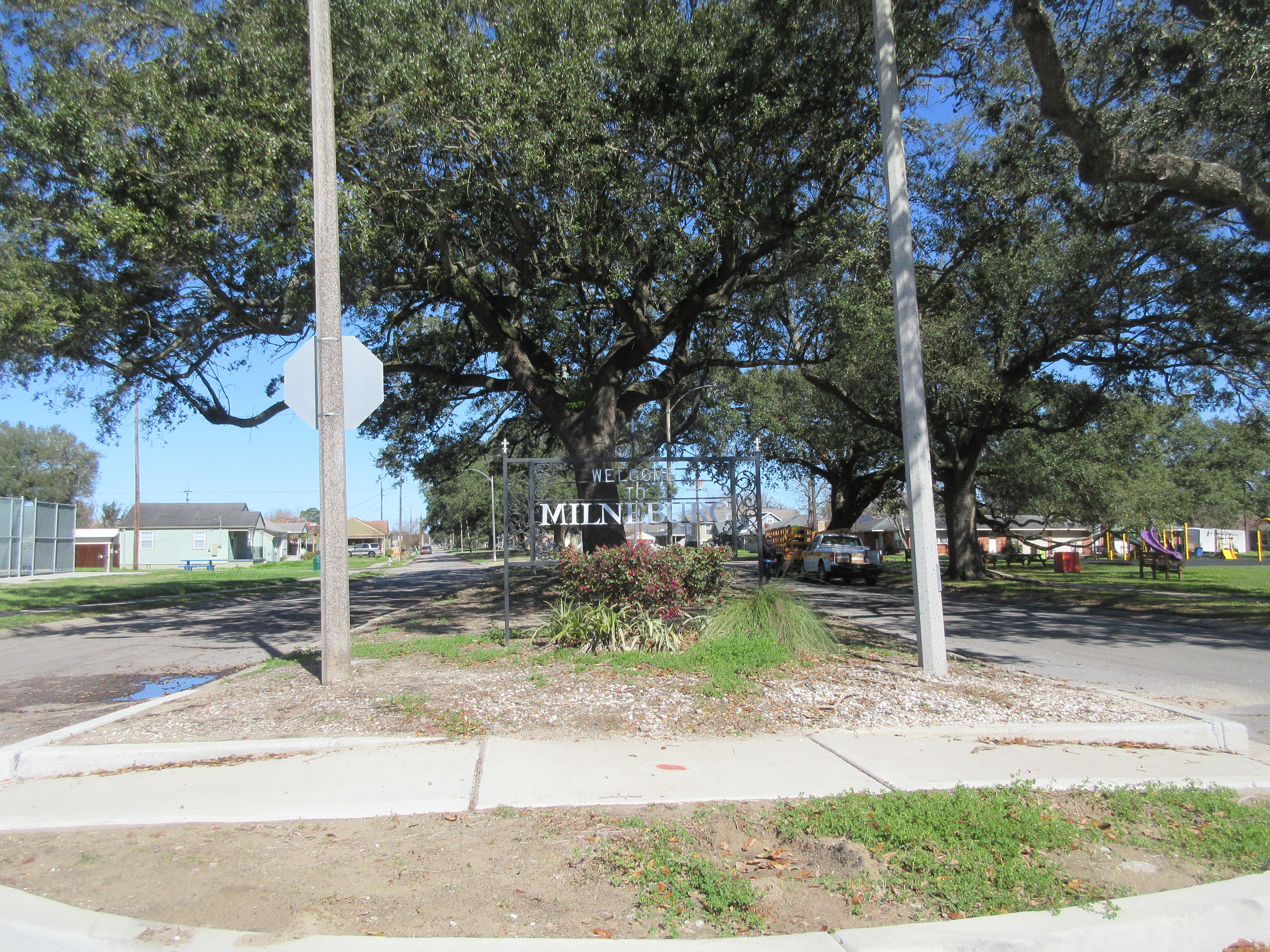
Image of Milneburg neighborhood in Gentilly district, New Orleans

Milneburg is a neighborhood of the city of New Orleans. A subdistrict of the Gentilly District Area, its boundaries as defined by the City Planning Commission are: Leon C. Simon Drive to the north, People's Avenue to the east, Filmore Ave to the south and Elysian Fields Avenue to the west, putting it within the 8th Ward of New Orleans. The Milneburg neighborhood takes its name from Milneburg, a historic town and neighborhood formerly located a short distance north of the modern neighborhood.

== Geography ==
Milneburg is located at 30°01′09″N 90°03′12″W and has an elevation of 0 feet (0.0 m). According to the United States Census Bureau, the district has a total area of 0.73 square miles (1.9 km^{2}). 0.73 square miles (1.9 km^{2}) of which is land and 0.00 square miles (0.0 km^{2}) (0.0%) of which is water.

=== Adjacent Neighborhoods ===
- Lake Terrace/Lake Oaks (north)
- Pontchartrain Park (east)
- Gentilly Terrace (south)
- St. Anthony (west)

=== Boundaries ===
The City Planning Commission defines the boundaries of Milneburg as these streets: Leon C. Simon Drive, People's Avenue, Filmore Avenue and Elysian Fields Avenue.

== Demographics ==
As of the census of 2000, there were 5,640 people, 2,194 households, and 1,507 families residing in the neighborhood. The population density was 7,726 /mi^{2} (2,968 /km^{2}).

As of the census of 2010, there were 3,405 people, 1,337 households, and 873 families residing in the neighborhood.

== Description ==
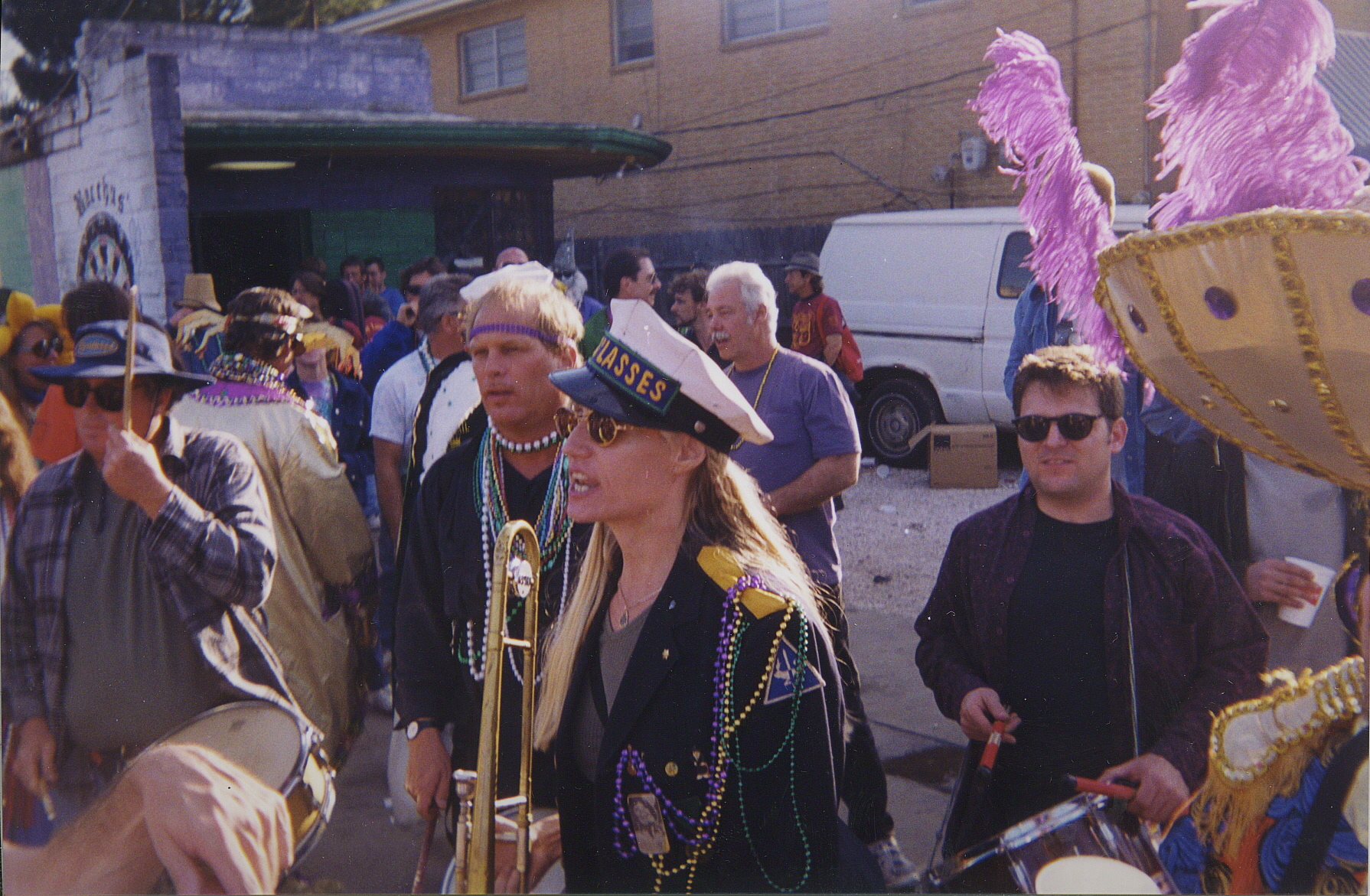
"Krewe of Dreux" neighborhood Mardi Gras celebrations, 2000.

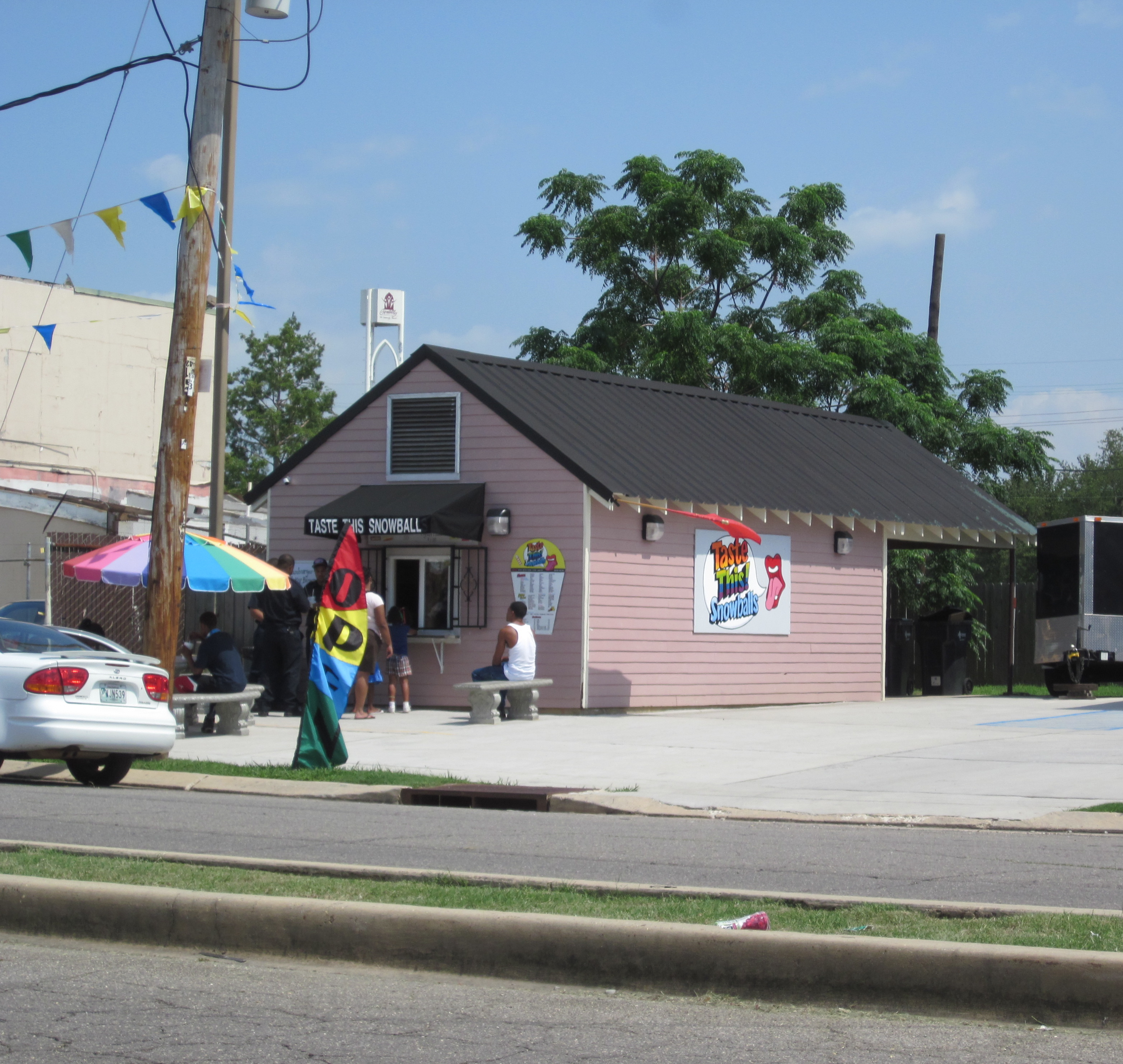
Sno-ball shop, Summer 2011

About a mile south of Lake Pontchartrain lies the neighborhood of Milneburg. Its residents consist of University teachers from the University of New Orleans, single-family residents and retirees. The area also has many churches, a police station, and also a high school nearby.

The area around these sites is still sometimes referred to as Milneburg, but the term is more usually heard in reference to the historic place.

The neighborhood now designated as "Milneburg" by the New Orleans Planning Commission is actually to the south and inland of the historic Milneburg. The boundaries according to local tradition can vary, with some saying Milneburg is located in the area bordered by the streets of St. Roch, Elysian Fields, Filmore and Mexico, while others groups state the area is much larger, going from Leon C. Simon to Filmore, and Elysian Fields to Franklin.

The types of homes in the area vary but single-family dwellings are the most common. There were only a few shotgun doubles, a very popular style of housing in the city of New Orleans. The architectural styles of the homes would come under Louisiana Vernacular and Louisiana Victorian. Vernacular homes feature deep one and two story porches, high ceilings with columns, French doors with full-length windows and large shutters. Homes of this type are said to have either a Creole or Acadian influenced design. Victorian homes feature architectural details such as arches, large porches, and decorative millwork .

Like the majority of New Orleans, the neighborhood experienced major flooding due to the failure of the Federal levee system during Hurricane Katrina in 2005. Recovery has been gradual, but as of early 2012 a good number of houses and businesses are back.

== See also ==
- New Orleans neighborhoods
- Gentilly, New Orleans
