= Gentilly, New Orleans =

Gentilly
- New Orleans neighborhood
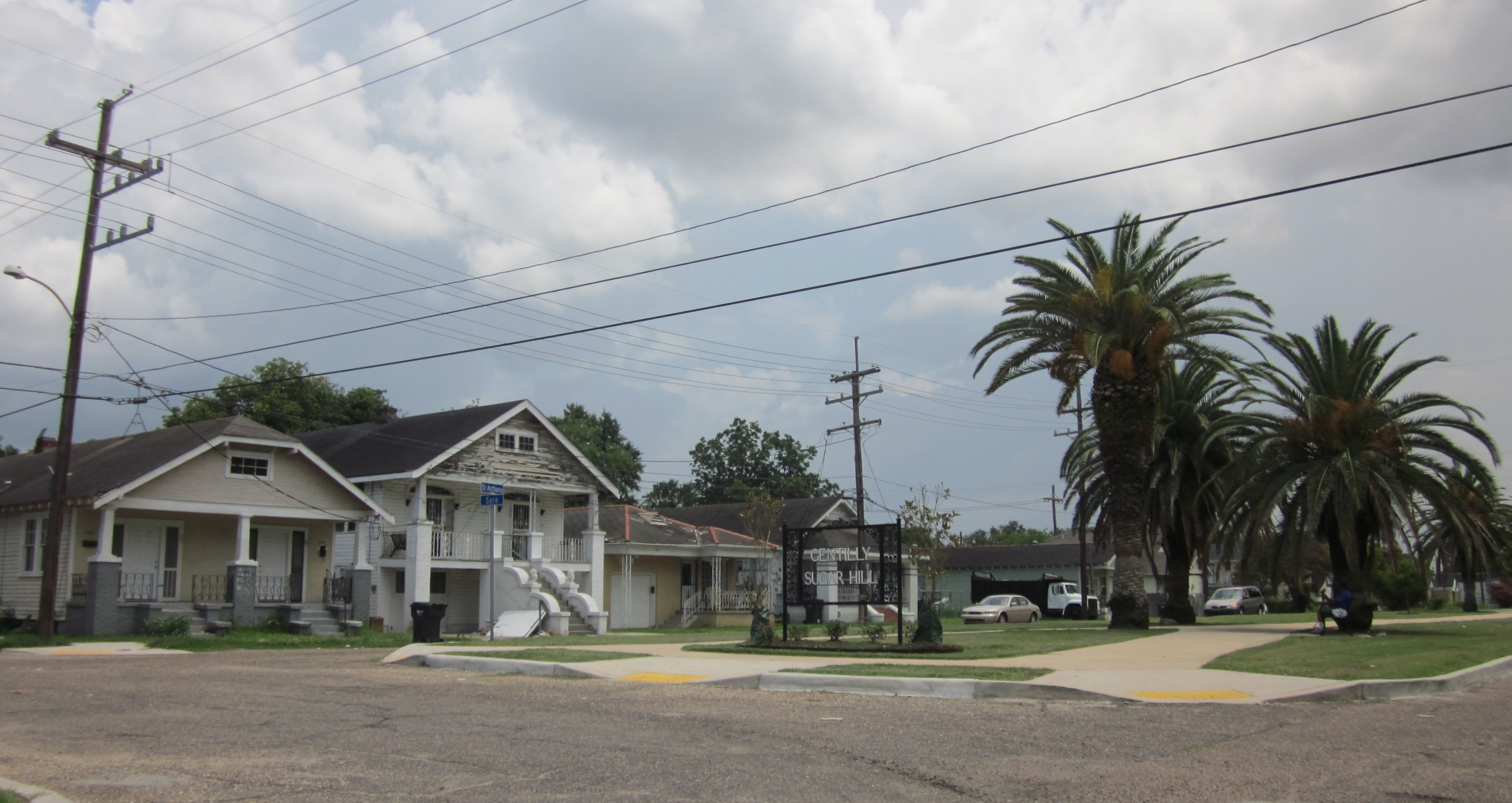
- Gentilly "Sugar Hill" section, New Orleans

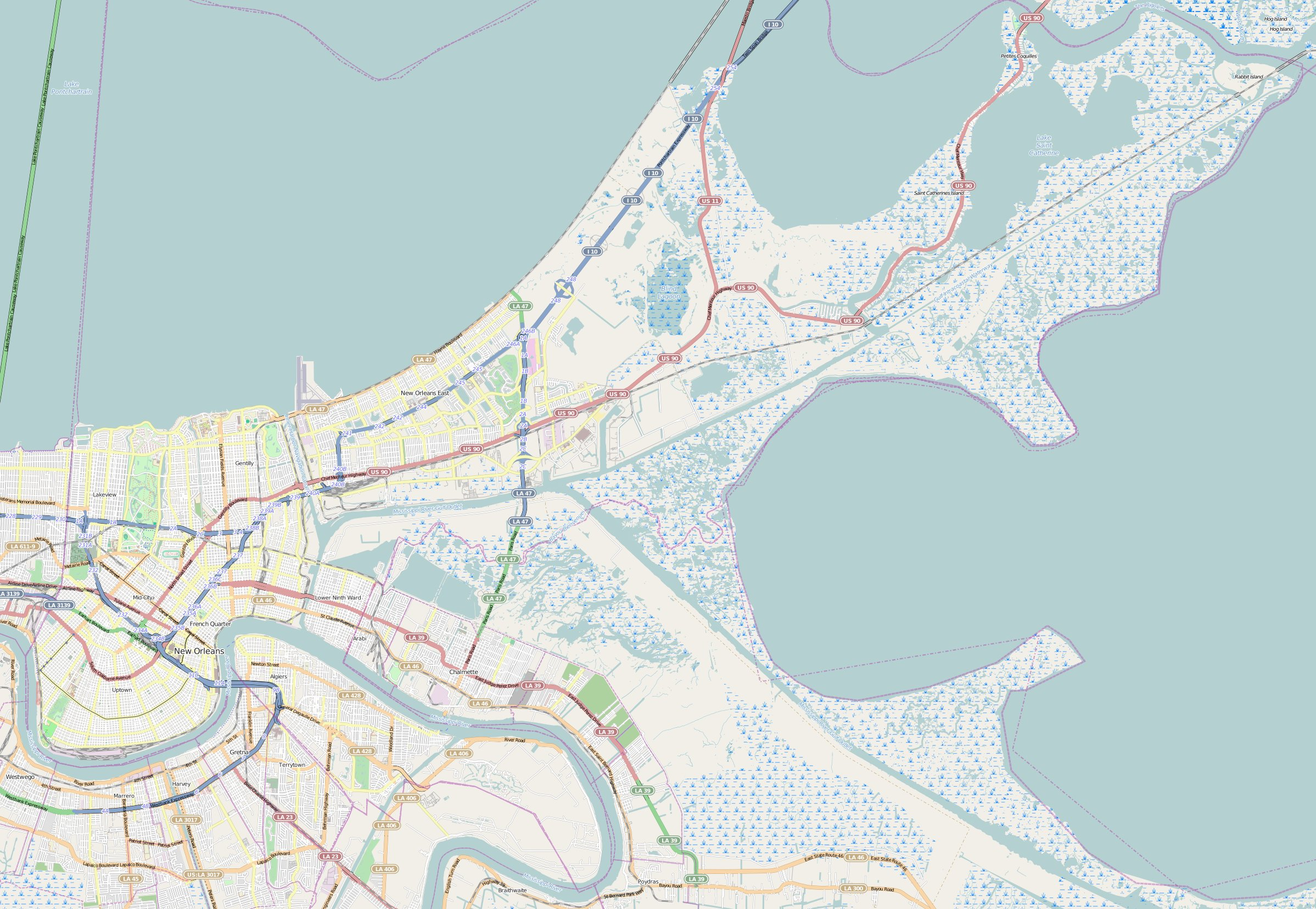
- Location within New Orleans
- Coordinates: 30.0125°N 90.0603°W
- Country: United States
- State: Louisiana
- City: New Orleans

Government
  - Mayor: Helena Moreno
- Time zone: UTC-6 (CST)
  - Summer (DST): UTC-5 (CDT)
- Area code: 504

Gentilly is a broad, lower‑middle‑income and racially diverse section of New Orleans, Louisiana, United States. The Gentilly neighborhood is bounded by Lake Pontchartrain to the north, France Road to the east, Bayou St. John to the west, and CSX Transportation railroad tracks to the south.

The major north–south streets are Franklin Avenue, Elysian Fields Avenue, St. Anthony, St. Bernard, St. Roch, Paris, Wisner, A.P. Tureaud (formerly London) Avenue and Press. The east–west streets are Lakeshore Drive, Leon C. Simon, Allen Toussaint Blvd (a section of which was formerly called Hibernia), Prentiss, Harrison, Filmore, Mirabeau, Hayne, Chef Menteur, and Gentilly.

== History ==
Originally, Gentilly is a small town located south of Paris, in France.

The first part of Gentilly to be developed was along the Gentilly Ridge, a long stretch of high ground along the former banks of Bayou Gentilly. A road, originally "Gentilly Road", was built on the ridge, and formed the eastern path into the oldest part of the city, today's French Quarter to Chef Menteur Pass. The high ground became Gentilly Boulevard and U.S. Highway 90, part of the Old Spanish Trail from St. Augustine, Florida to Los Angeles, California.

Settlement was originally mostly confined to along the long narrow ridge, plus Milneburg, built on elevated piers on the shore of Lake Pontchartrain. Most of the ground between the ridge and the lake was swampy. The first residential section adjacent to the ridge, Gentilly Terrace, dating to the early 20th century, was built by excavating and piling up the earth in the shallow swamp to create blocks of terraced land where houses could be built. With the development of improved drainage pumps (see drainage in New Orleans), land reclamation and higher lakefront levees, the land extending from the ridge to the lake was developed by the mid-20th century, and the entire area popularly came to be known as Gentilly.

Gentilly has traditionally been defined variously. Some definitions include a somewhat wider area, extending the neighborhood into the Upper 9th Ward. Some older New Orleanians extend the definition even further, to include the section of old Gentilly on the east side of the Industrial Canal, now part of Eastern New Orleans. Other definitions diminish the area occupied by Gentilly by placing the western boundary of Gentilly along the London Avenue Canal, not Bayou St. John, and the northern boundary along Leon C. Simon Drive, not the shore of Lake Pontchartrain. By this reckoning, Mirabeau Gardens, Vista Park and Oak Park, lying between the London Avenue Canal and Bayou St. John, fall outside of Gentilly, as do the Lakefront subdivisions of Lake Terrace and Lake Oaks, and the Lakefront campus of the University of New Orleans which doesn't necessarily imply that these areas are disregarded as a “part” of Gentilly.

== Hurricane Katrina ==
Apart from the natural high ground along the Gentilly Ridge and the Lakefront section, itself raised above sea level on man-made land created by a project of the Orleans Levee Board in the early 20th century, Gentilly was badly damaged following Hurricane Katrina. The London Avenue Canal floodwalls were breached in two places by Katrina's storm surge, flooding most of the area. Gentilly's population has slowly returned, with most homes requiring major gutting and repair work before they could be reoccupied. As of the start of 2007, the area is moderately populated with something less than half of its pre-Katrina residents and businesses having returned.

Archdiocese of New Orleans decided to close Redeemer-Seton High School while building a new campus for Holy Cross High School on Paris Avenue, on the former sites of St. Francis Cabrini Church and School and Redeemer-Seton. Marian Central Catholic Middle School, formerly St. Raphael School, has been demolished, and the parishes of St. Raphael and St. Frances Cabrini have been merged to form Transfiguration parish, currently (as of February 2010) holding services on the campus of the University of New Orleans as well as in the former St. Raphael's church building which has since been restored.

=== 2007 tornado ===
On February 13, 2007, an EF2 tornado struck the Pontchartrain Park neighborhood in the town, many FEMA trailer created after the storm were heavily damaged or destroyed, including one where an elderly woman was killed. Other structures, homes, trees, and power poles and lines were damaged and 10 other people were injured.

== Bus service ==
Bus service from the New Orleans Regional Transit Authority (NORTA):

- 51-St. Bernard via Lake Vista, which runs from Canal to St. Bernard before going down Paris to Lake Pontchartrain.
- 52-St. Bernard via Canal St.; Paris Ave.; UNO, which runs from Canal St, to Claiborne, to St. Bernard turned on Paris to Mirabeau to St. Anthony and ended in front of Ben Franklin High, now it travels onto the campus of the University of New Orleans.
- 55- Elysian Fields which runs from University of New Orleans, Elysian Fields at Gentilly (Nearside, Elysian Fields at Galvez, St Claude at Elysian Fields, Canal at Tchoupitoulas.
- 57-Franklin Avenue bus, Southern University at New Orleans (Park 2), Southern University (Lake Campus), Franklin at UNO Arena, Franklin at Gentilly, Franklin at Galvez, St Claude at Elysian Fields (Nearside, S. Rampart at Canal)
- 94- Broad St. from Broad & Washington; travels up Broad Street to Gentilly Boulevard (US-90), and continues on 90 eastbound before turning right onto Michoud Boulevard, turns onto Old Gentilly Rd, travels westbound on Chef Menteur Highway (US-90), makes a turn northbound on Michoud Boulevard, takes a right onto Dwyer Boulevard heading eastbound, and finally makes a turn on Alcee Fortier Boulevard before turning back onto US-90 westbound.

== Cityscape ==
Gentilly is bounded by Lake Pontchartrain to the north, Interstate 610 to the south, City Park to the west, and the Industrial Canal to the east.

== Neighborhoods ==
Neighborhoods in the area include:

- Dillard
- Filmore
- Milneburg
- Mirabeau Gardens: Mirabeau Ave. to Filmore Ave. and The London Ave. Canal to Paris Ave.
- Oak Park: St. Bernard Ave to Paris Ave, Mirabeau Ave to Robert E Lee Blvd.
- Vista Park: Paris Ave to London Avenue Canal, Filmore to Robert E Lee Blvd.
- Edgewood: Gentilly to L&N (Now CSX) tracks, Elysian Fields to Peoples Avenue
- Gentilly Terrace: Gentilly to Dreux, Elysian Fields to Peoples Avenue
- Gentilly Heights: London Avenue Canal to Elysian Fields, Norman Meyer to Filmore
- Gentilly Woods, New Orleans/Pontchartrain Park: Leon C Simon/Haynes to Chef Menteur, Peoples to France Road/Industrial Canal
- [Lake Oaks, New Orleans]: From Leon C Simon to the Lake, Elysian Fields to Franklin Ave.
- Lake Terrace, New Orleans: From Robert E Lee to the Lake, Bayou St. John to London Avenue Canal
- St. Anthony, New Orleans

== Government and infrastructure ==
The Federal Bureau of Investigation operates its New Orleans Field Office in Gentilly.

== Education ==
=== Primary and secondary schools ===
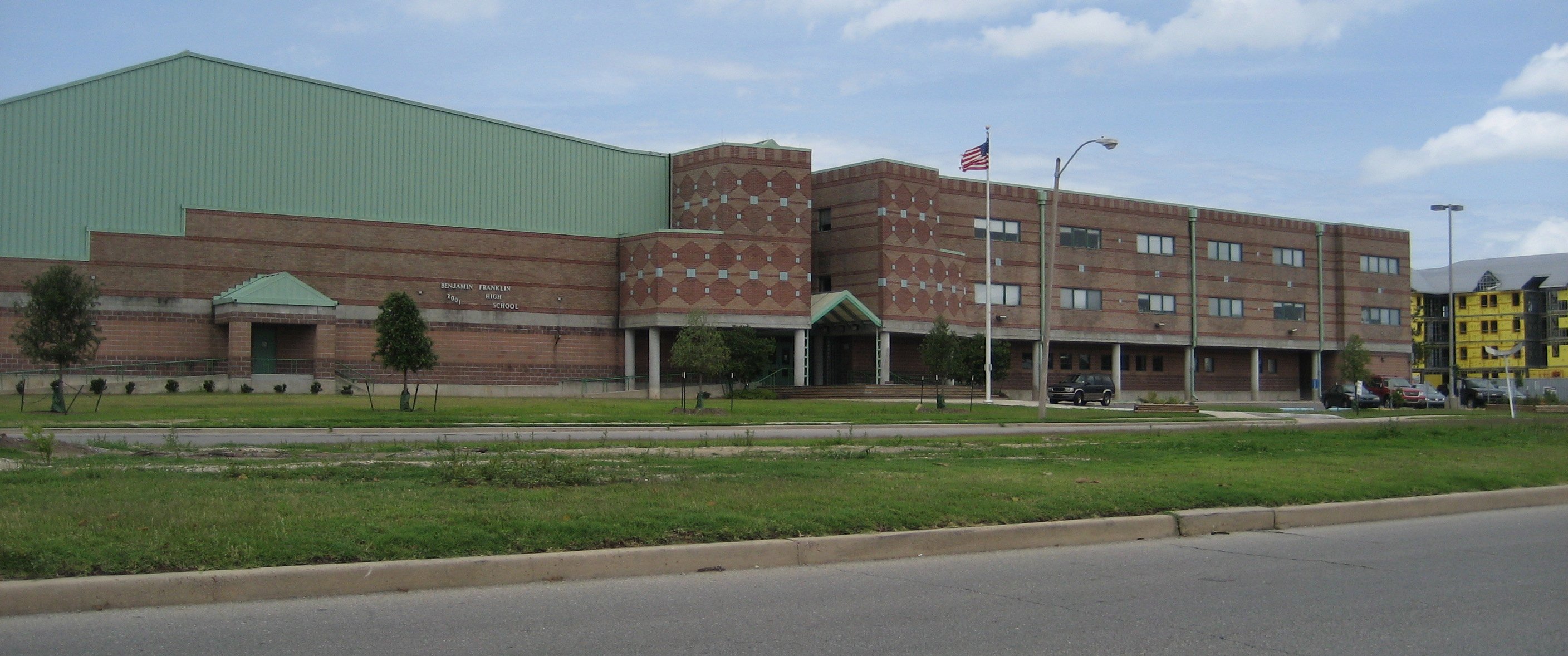
Benjamin Franklin High School

Three universities, the University of New Orleans, Southern University at New Orleans, and Dillard University are located in Gentilly. New Orleans Baptist Theological Seminary's main campus is also located in Gentilly. New Orleans Public Schools operates district schools, while Recovery School District oversees charter schools. Public district and charter schools in Gentilly:

- Benjamin Franklin Senior High School (Lake Terrace/Lake Oaks)
- Lake Area New Tech Early College High School
- Gentilly Terrace Charter School (Gentilly Terrace)
- Arthur Ashe Firstline School

Private schools in Gentilly:

- Brother Martin High School
- Holy Cross School

=== Public libraries ===
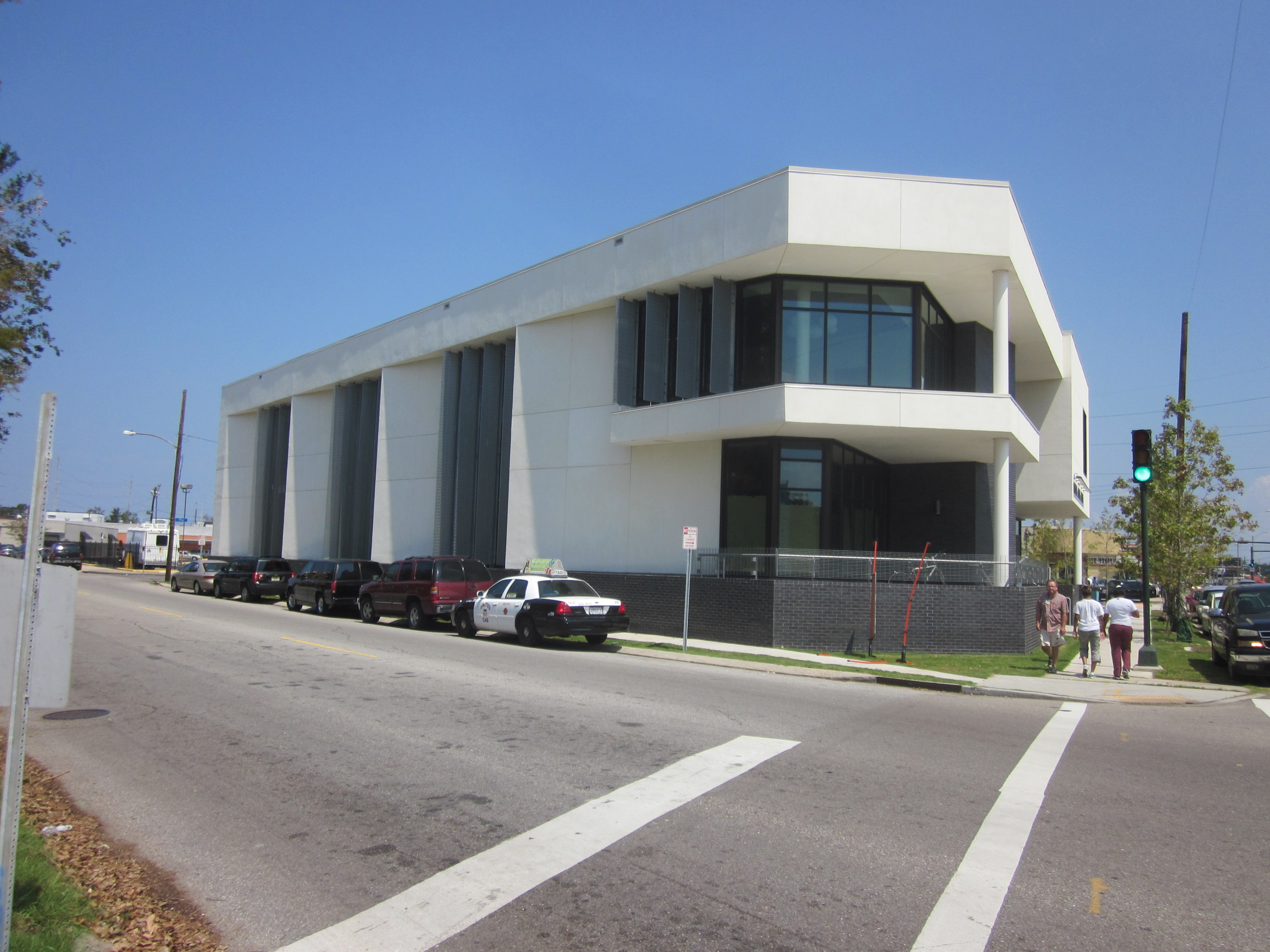
Norman Mayer Branch

The Norman Mayer Branch of the New Orleans Public Library is in Gentilly. It was damaged in Hurricane Katrina. The library, in a new $5.7 million facility, reopened on March 20, 2012. The 18,000-square-foot (1,700 m^{2}), two-story facility had 26 computers and about 40,000 volumes of books as of 2012. It had a price tag of $5.7 million. The post-Katrina temporary library, located in a strip center, had 19 computers.

The Federal Emergency Management Agency (FEMA) was to pay for the costs of demolition of the previous library and construction of the new library since the previous facility had been, according to FEMA's estimation, over 50% damaged by Katrina. The features and amenities present in the new facility that were not in the previous facility were financed by other sources, including New Orleans municipal bond sales and funds from the Louisiana Recovery Authority. The "design-build" process, one specially allowed only in parishes affected by Hurricane Katrina under Louisiana law, was used to rebuild this library and four others. Lee Ledbetter & Associates of New Orleans served as the architectural firm, and Gibbs Construction served as the construction company. Lee Ledbetter & Associates worked with Kansas City, Missouri firm Gould Evans & Associates to design this library and four others. Lee Ledbetter of Lee Ledbetter & Associates stated that the libraries his company designed were made to have better access to public transportation and have reduced utility usage, including having electricity and water-saving features, in order to be more cost effective.

== In popular culture ==
Binx Bolling, the protagonist of Walker Percy's National Book Award–winning 1961 novel The Moviegoer, lives in Gentilly.
