= Saint Roch Cemetery (disambiguation) =

The Saint Roch Cemetery is in Grenoble, France.

Saint Roch Cemetery or St. Roch Cemetery may also refer to:

- St. Roch Cemetery, New Orleans, in St. Roch, New Orleans, U.S.
- Saint Roch Cemetery, Częstochowa, Poland
