= St. Roch, New Orleans =

St. Roch
- New Orleans neighborhood
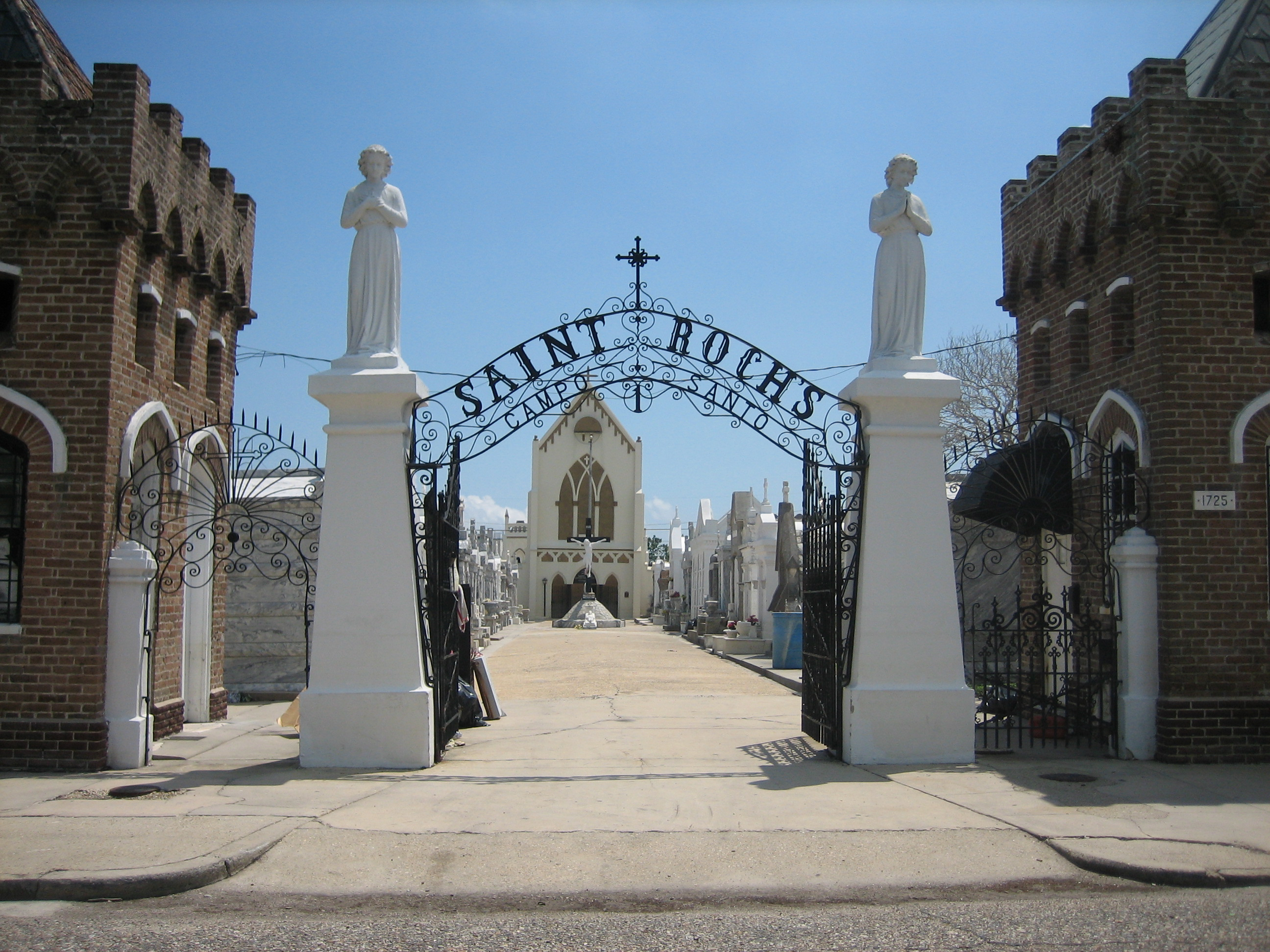
- The Shrine and Cemetery of Saint Roch gave the neighborhood its name
- Interactive map of St. Roch
- Coordinates: 29°59′06″N 90°03′13″W
- Country: United States
- State: Louisiana
- City: New Orleans
- Planning District: District 7, Bywater District

Area
  - Total: 1.25 sq mi (3.2 km^{2})
  - Land: 1.25 sq mi (3.2 km^{2})
  - Water: 0.00 sq mi (0 km^{2})
- Elevation: 0 ft (0 m)

Population (2010)
  - Total: 3,255
  - Density: 2,600/sq mi (1,010/km^{2})
- Time zone: UTC-6 (CST)
  - Summer (DST): UTC-5 (CDT)
- Area code: 504

St. Roch is a neighborhood of the U.S. city of New Orleans. A subdistrict of the Bywater District Area, its boundaries as defined by the City Planning Commission are: Lafreniere Street, Paris Avenue, I-610, Benefit Street, and Dahlia Walk to the north; People's and Almonaster Avenues to the east; St. Claude Avenue to the south; Elysian Fields Avenue, Hope, Frenchmen, Duels, St. Anthony, Industry, Allen, & Agriculture Streets, A.P. Tureaud Avenue, Abundance, Republic, Treasure, & Dugue Streets, and Florida & St. Bernard Avenues to the west.

== History ==
The city of New Orleans was founded by the French in the early 1700s, ruled for 40 years by the Spanish, and declared territory of the United States in 1803 with the Louisiana Purchase. New Orleans is known for its Creole culture and history. During the Spanish period, starting in 1763, the laws allowed for a free people of color or gens de colour. Being near many waterways, New Orleans was able to easily import and export goods to and from the Caribbean, South America, and Europe. With New Orleans' growth as a major port city in the 19th century, many neighborhoods began to develop as people migrated to the more promising areas.

One of the neighborhoods that came into play was the St. Roch neighborhood. Originally called Faubourg Franklin, the neighborhood began to develop in 1830 when the Pontchartrain Railroad connected the Faubourg Marigny with the settlement of Milneburg on the shore of Lake Pontchartrain. “The area has a proud history as home to one of the country's largest populations of free people of color before the Civil War.” GNOCDC. By the 20th century, St. Roch had grown considerably with new technologies of sewerage and water services. By the late 1920s, St. Roch was considered a “low-key”, serene, racially mixed residential section of New Orleans.

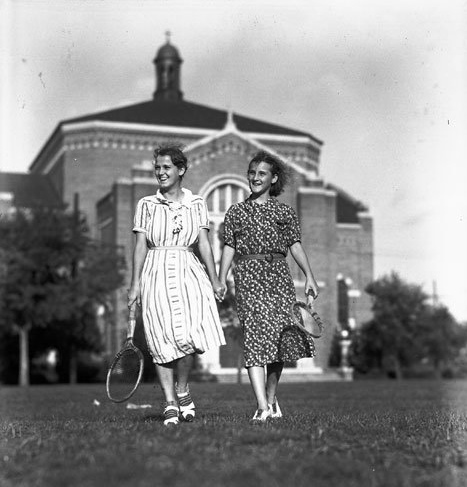
Tennis players at St. Roch Playground with Our Lady Star of the Sea Church in the background, 1936

The early St. Roch neighborhood had many recreational aspects. A huge baseball field is remembered for its many baseball enthusiasts. St. Roch was known historically for its blacksmith shops, dairies, and small farms. As a racially diverse area, St. Roch was home to many Creole and black families, which led to various private and parochial schools being established for the area's children.

Although the neighborhood has lost some of its diversity—now being prominently African American because of highway construction for the splitting of Interstate-10—it is home to Independence Square and the St. Roch Playground, which was renamed the Harold Sampson Jr., St. Roch Playground in honor of the late coach of the New Orleans Recreation Department. One feature of the neighborhood is the St. Roch Market, previously an open air seafood fish market, has now been turned into an upscale food court with several local vendors.

St. Roch got its current name in 1867 with the dedication of the St. Roch shrine and cemetery. In 1867 as the yellow fever epidemic was on the rise, a German priest, Rev. Peter Leonard Thevis, arrived in New Orleans, turning to Saint Roch, the patron of good health. Promising that if no one in the parish died from the epidemic, he would build a chapel in honor of Saint Roch, Rev. Thevis brought healing to the community. Nobody from the Holy Trinity parish died from the fever in either the epidemic of 1867 or the one in 1878. To give his thanks, Thevis built a chapel as a shrine, and a cemetery as a final resting place for his parishioners. The St. Roch shrine, cemetery, and chapel have served as landmarks and places for many New Orleanians to continue traditions.

== Geography ==
St. Roch is located at 29°59′06″N 90°03′13″W and has an elevation of 0 feet (0.0 m). According to the United States Census Bureau, the district has a total area of 1.25 square miles (3.2 km^{2}). 1.25 square miles (3.2 km^{2}) of which is land and 0.00 square miles (0.0 km^{2}) (0.0%) of which is water.

St. Roch is part of the district of the Bywater. In the early years of St. Roch, the boundaries were never clearly defined. As time went on, the city of New Orleans placed clear boundaries on the neighborhood. The City Planning Commission now defines the boundary of St. Roch using several streets which include Elysian Fields (west), St. Claude Avenue (south), Franklin Avenue (east), and Florida Avenue (north). In the past, citizens knew of the whereabouts of the western, eastern, and southern boundaries; however, it was not until recent years that the city clearly defined a northern boundary for this neighborhood. Some of the neighborhoods that surround this neighborhood are Gentilly Terrace, St. Claude, Faubourg Marigny, and the 7th Ward of New Orleans. Also, the I-10, the most frequented highway in this city, cuts right through the heart of this neighborhood. According to the United States Census Bureau, “this district has a total areas of 1.25 square miles.” All of these square miles are on land which means that St. Roch does not have any bodies of water in its boundaries. St. Roch is home to several landmarks which includes parks and churches. The most famous of these locations are the St. Roch Park, the St. Roch Market, and the St. Roch Church and Cemetery. Both of these played an important role in the creation of the neighborhood. These landmarks and their importance to the establishment of St. Roch will be further discussed in the Landmarks section of this page.

=== Adjacent neighborhoods ===
- St. Bernard Projects (north)
- Dillard (north)
- Gentilly Terrace (north)
- Desire Area (east)
- St. Claude (east)
- Marigny (south)
- Seventh Ward (west)
- Fairgrounds (west)

=== Boundaries ===
The City Planning Commission defines the boundaries of St. Roch as these streets: Lafreniere Street, Paris Avenue, I-610, Benefit Street, Dahlia Walk, People's Avenue, Almonaster Avenue, St. Claude Avenue, Elysian Fields Avenue, Hope Street, Frenchmen Street, Duels Street, St. Anthony Street, Industry Street, Allen Street, Agriculture Street, A.P. Tureaud Avenue, Abundance Street, Republic Street, Treasure Street, Dugue Street, Florida Avenue and St. Bernard Avenue.

== Landmarks ==
=== St. Roch Market ===
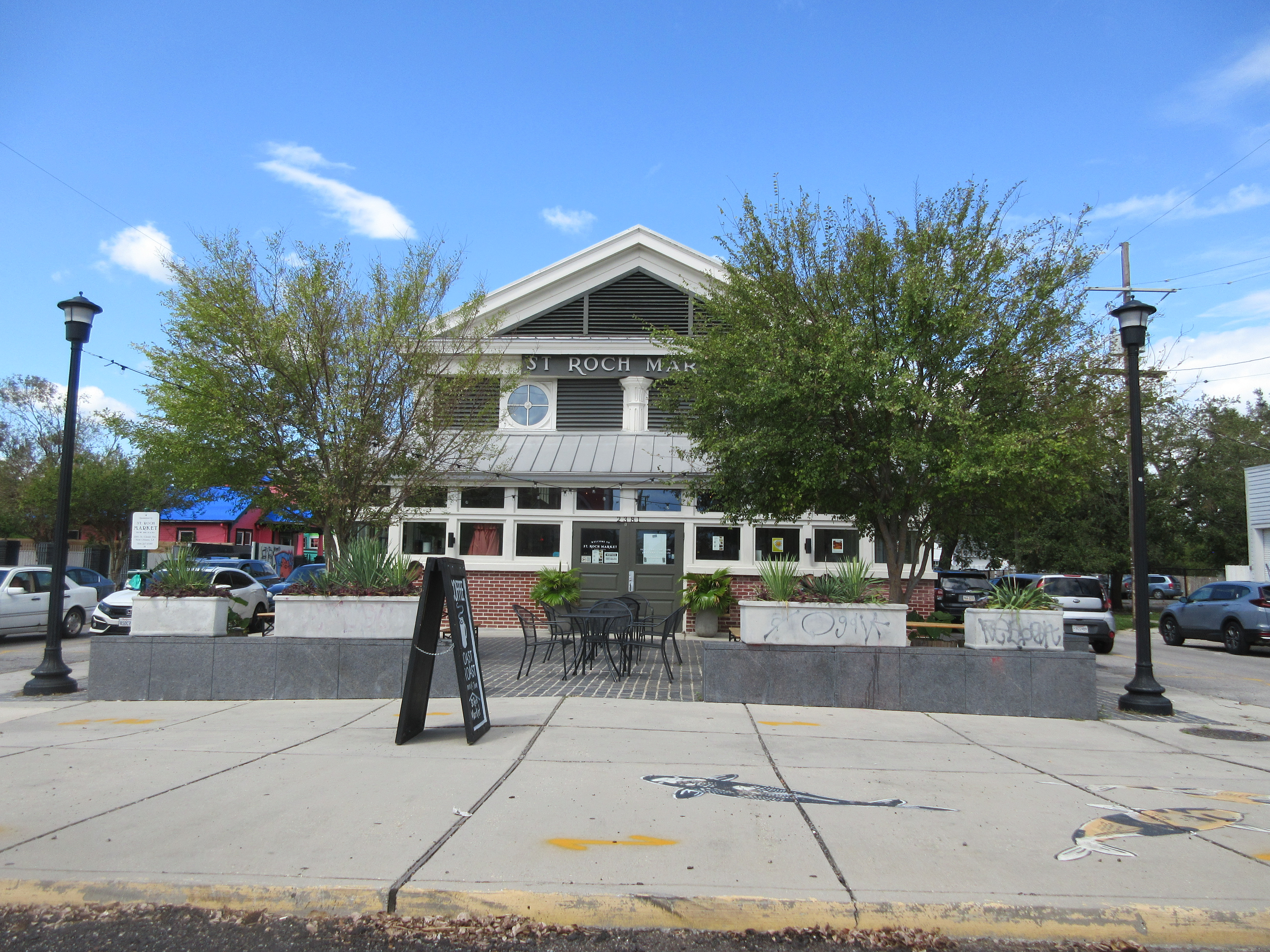
St. Roch Market in 2021

The St. Roch neighborhood of New Orleans has many landmarks that can be considered to hold significant historical value. One of the older landmarks of St. Roch is the market in the neighborhood known simply as the St. Roch Market. It was built in 1875 as an open-air market on St. Claude Avenue and began to struggle by the time the Great Depression had come around. During 1903, it was valued at only $2,000. By the 1930s, the city-owned market was designated for demolition because the building was in disrepair. In response to this, the residents of the area protested heavily in order to stop the city from tearing down the market. Their protests worked and in 1932, Sam Stone Jr. & Co. was issued to renovate the market. These renovations included full enclosures, refrigeration, and plumbing.

The market was further improved in 1937 by the Works Progress Administration. It was later turned over to private ownership and housed Lama's Seafood Market for several years. The market was doing well, selling fresh seafood for years and having one portion used as a restaurant as the Chinese immigrants who operated it desired, until it was practically destroyed in 2005 by Hurricane Katrina. The interior and exterior of the building were damaged significantly. Years after the destruction, the city of New Orleans began their attempts to rebuild the market to restore it to its previous state or better.

In recent times, the market underwent a $3.7-million renovation. These renovations were expected to be finished by the end of March and would extend beyond the market's backdoor and on the St. Roch neutral ground. The restoration includes roofing replacing, exterior masonry repair, and replacement of electrical, plumbing, and mechanical systems. The flooring of the market would also be replaced as well as the exterior doors, interior doors, and windows. Businessmen from several different companies came together to create St. Roch Community Partners Inc. and made it known that they had an idea for the St. Roch market. They wanted to use a dozen stalls in order to provide space so local vendors could sell their fresh foods along with kitchen staples at affordable prices. They would also like to open a restaurant in the back of the market. They have a non-profit structure for the market and would invest revenues into the market themselves for things such as maintenance. The goal the group is trying to achieve is to create a market that will be open six days a week where residents of the St. Roch neighborhood and the surrounding area could go buy both seasonal local produce. The market reopened in April, 2015 featuring a variety of venues offering fresh juice, Nigerian food, seafood, sweets, Creole food, cocktails, coffee and fresh produce among others. Despite its lofty ideals, it has come under fire since opening for failing to provide groceries, charging excessive rents to vendors, being prohibitively expensive for the overwhelming majority of local residents, and exploiting federal relief money for the enrichment of its private founders. This objection is proof positive as of now 8/2019

=== Cemetery/chapel ===
The St. Roch chapel is located in the cemetery. It is filled with prosthetics, crutches, and other ex-votos of those who visit the chapel to ask St. Roch for healing. In addition to being an important religious site, St. Roch chapel is also a popular site for tourists as it exemplifies the "exotic" Catholicism of New Orleans.

== Schools/education ==
The St. Roch neighborhood is home to the Our Lady Star of the Sea School. It is a Catholic institution with the majority of its students being of African American descent.

== Demographics ==
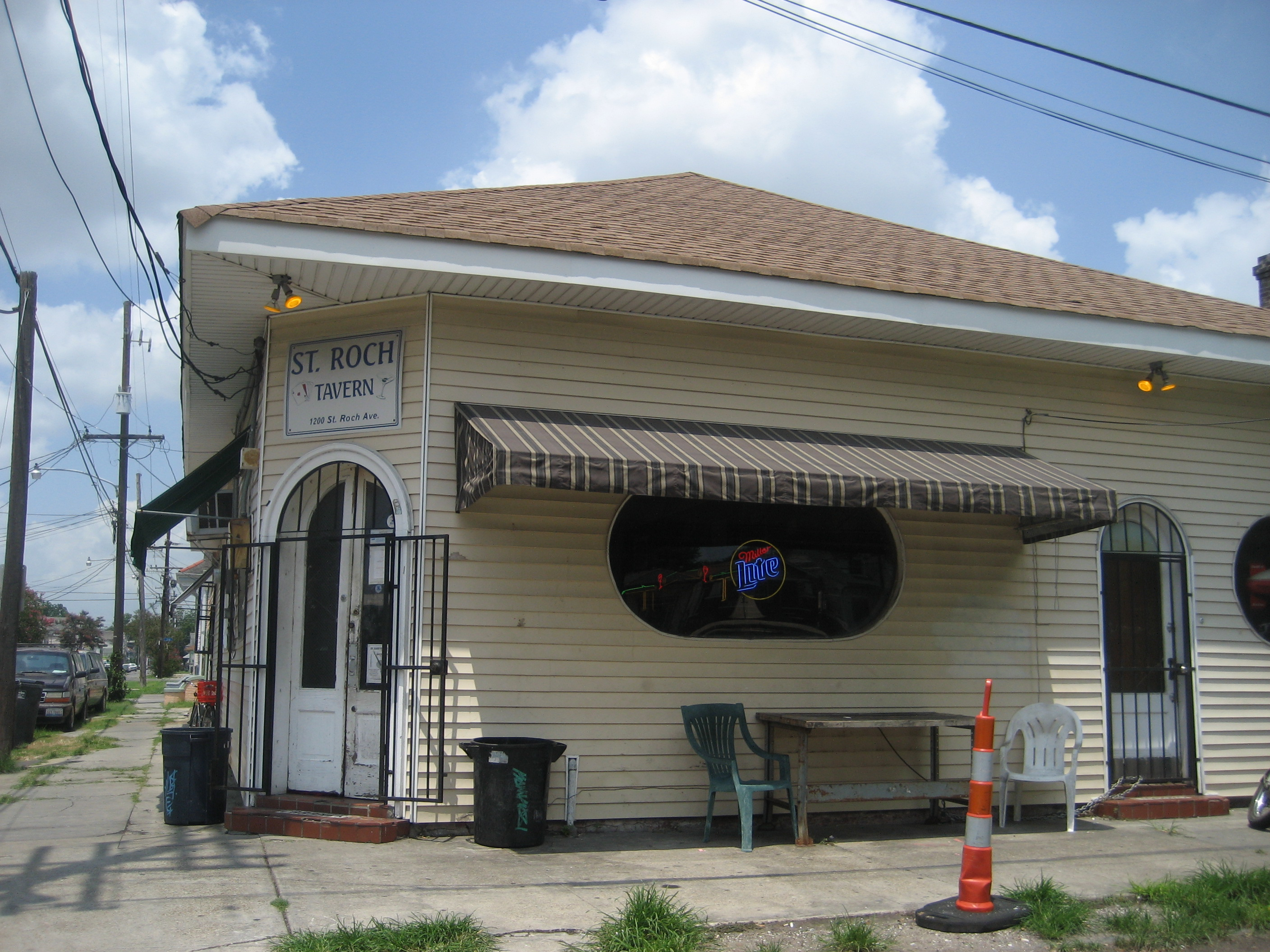
Corner bar also serves as neighborhood gathering place for events and live music venue

As of the census of 2000, there were 11,975 people, 4,336 households, and 2,885 families residing in the neighborhood. The population density was 9,580 /mi^{2} (3,742 /km^{2}).

As of the census of 2010, there were 6,632 people, 2,604 households, and 1,505 families residing in the neighborhood.

Although it was once a racially diverse neighborhood, the majority of the population of St. Roch is African American. The total area of is 1.255 square miles with a population of 6,575 with 5,239 individuals being African American based on the 2011 census. The population consisted of 3,097 males and 3,478 females; with the median age of males being 34.7 and females 39.5. The average household size is 2.3 people with the percentage of family households being 34.4%. The percentage of married families is 19.6% while the percentage of married families with children is 17.7% and the percentage of single mother households is a significantly larger 39.0%. Percentage of never married males 15 years and older in the area is 24.8% while the percentage of never married females 15 years and older is 30.2%. Although most of St. Roch is African American, there is 1.1% of the population that do not speak English well or at all. The percentage of individuals that live in St. Roch and were born in New Orleans is 87.8%, with foreign born residents being 2.6% of the St. Roch population. The education attainment of the neighborhood fluctuates as the level of education increases. The percentage of residents that achieved less than a high school education is 42.3%. Residents that achieve a high school education or equivalent is 8.5%, less than one year of college is 6.6%, 1 or more years of college is 12.1%, percentage of residents that have an associate degree stands at a 2.3%, bachelor's degree is at 6.9%, residents who have a master's degree is 9.6% professional degrees stand at a 9.6% as well, and residents who have attained a doctorates degree in the area is at 2.2%.

== 21st century developments ==
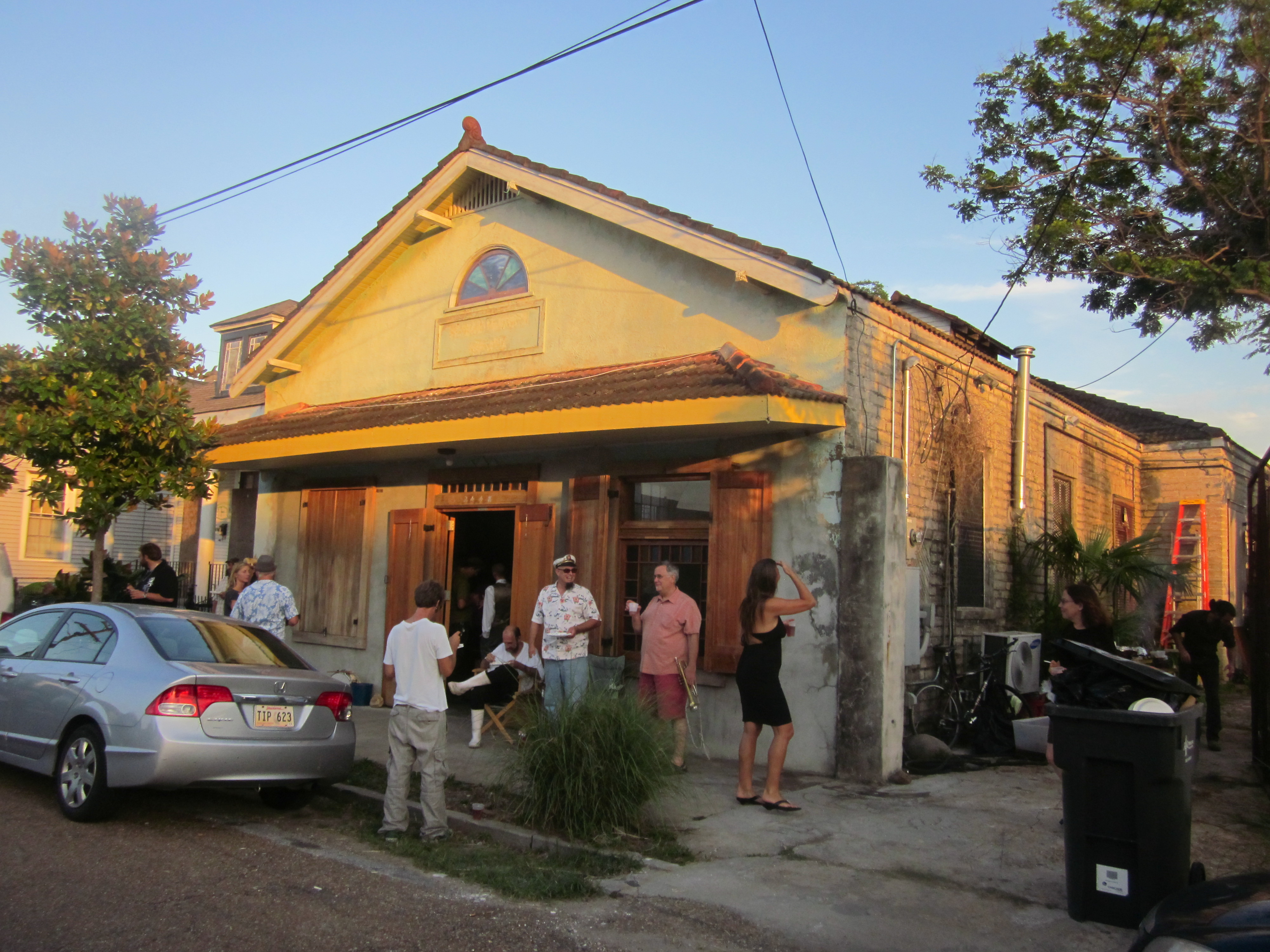
Event at an old neighborhood house turned into an art gallery, 2012

Raising several million dollars to renovate most of the landmarks in the neighborhood, they spent over $3 million working on the St. Roch Market, completed in by 2015. The St. Roch Market was devastated by the flood waters of Hurricane Katrina, but in July 2012, Mayor Mitch Landrieu initiated the remodeling of the abandoned marketplace. Hurricane Katrina did much structural damage to the building and the foundation itself. This damage had to be repaired before the contractors could begin remodeling the structure. Also, the electrical and plumbing systems had to be replaced, because they were severely damaged by the flood waters. The market was originally opened in 1875, and it was where farmers went to sell their fresh fruits and vegetables. Over the years, farmers have stopped going to the market to sell their good; other vendors such as crawfish sellers and po-boy makers have taken their place. The newly renovated marketplace will also feature an art walk which guides visitors to the St. Roch Park. Now, St. Roch Market is a southern food hall featuring several food and beverage purveyors.

The city of New Orleans is also trying to revitalize the St. Roch Park, which has become desolate and bare in recent years. During the months after Hurricane Katrina, the park was converted into a parking lot which housed FEMA trailers. After the FEMA trailers were removed, the park was left abandoned. However, in early 2013, Mayor Landrieu cleared almost $2 million to renovate and restore the park. On July 1, 2013, the mayor led a ribbon cutting ceremony which officially reopened the park. The St. Roch park now has a new baseball diamond and a repaved basketball court.

After the I-10 was built through the center of St. Roch, and after it was hit by one of the worst hurricanes the city had seen, St. Roch experienced a period of great decline. The wind and flood waters from Hurricane Katrina damaged most of the structures in the neighborhood. The City of New Orleans has begun several projects to repair the damage done to this neighborhood by Hurricane Katrina. The majority of these projects involve cleaning up this neighborhood and ridding it of the debris left by Hurricane Katrina. The city plans on repaving the roads in St. Roch because the flood waters left the pavement uneven with countless potholes. There are also organizations, such St. Roch CDC, which are helping to restore old buildings in the neighborhood. The organization has already helped restore several old houses and office buildings in the last few years. Also, the City of New Orleans has hired landscapers to plant flowers and trees through the neighborhood in an attempt to return this neighborhood to its original state.

The population of St. Roch decreased by 56 percent between 2000 and 2010. Most of the houses in this area are vacant. Many of the residents of this neighborhood moved out after evacuating for Hurricane Katrina. The City of New Orleans believes that by restoring and cleaning up this neighborhood, people will want to return. The city is also in the process of performing restoration of some landmarks in the neighborhood. The city has decided to clean up the St. Roch Firehouse and the St. Roch Cemetery and Chapel.

== Politics ==
The St. Roch neighborhood is in District 7/Bywater district. The Senator of District 7 is David Heitmeier. The Bywater district is located along the Mississippi River down from the French Quarter and the Faubourg Marigny. Its boundaries are a bit unclear. People of the New Orleans area usually describe the area as being bordered by the St. Claude Avenue, the Industrial Canal, and Press Street. The bywater district is also known as the Upper Ninth Ward.

New Orleans is also in the 2nd Congregational district. Representative Troy Carter represents this district. Carter began serving as representative in 2021.

== See also ==
- Neighborhoods in New Orleans
