= Gentilly Terrace, New Orleans =

Gentilly Terrace
- New Orleans Neighborhood
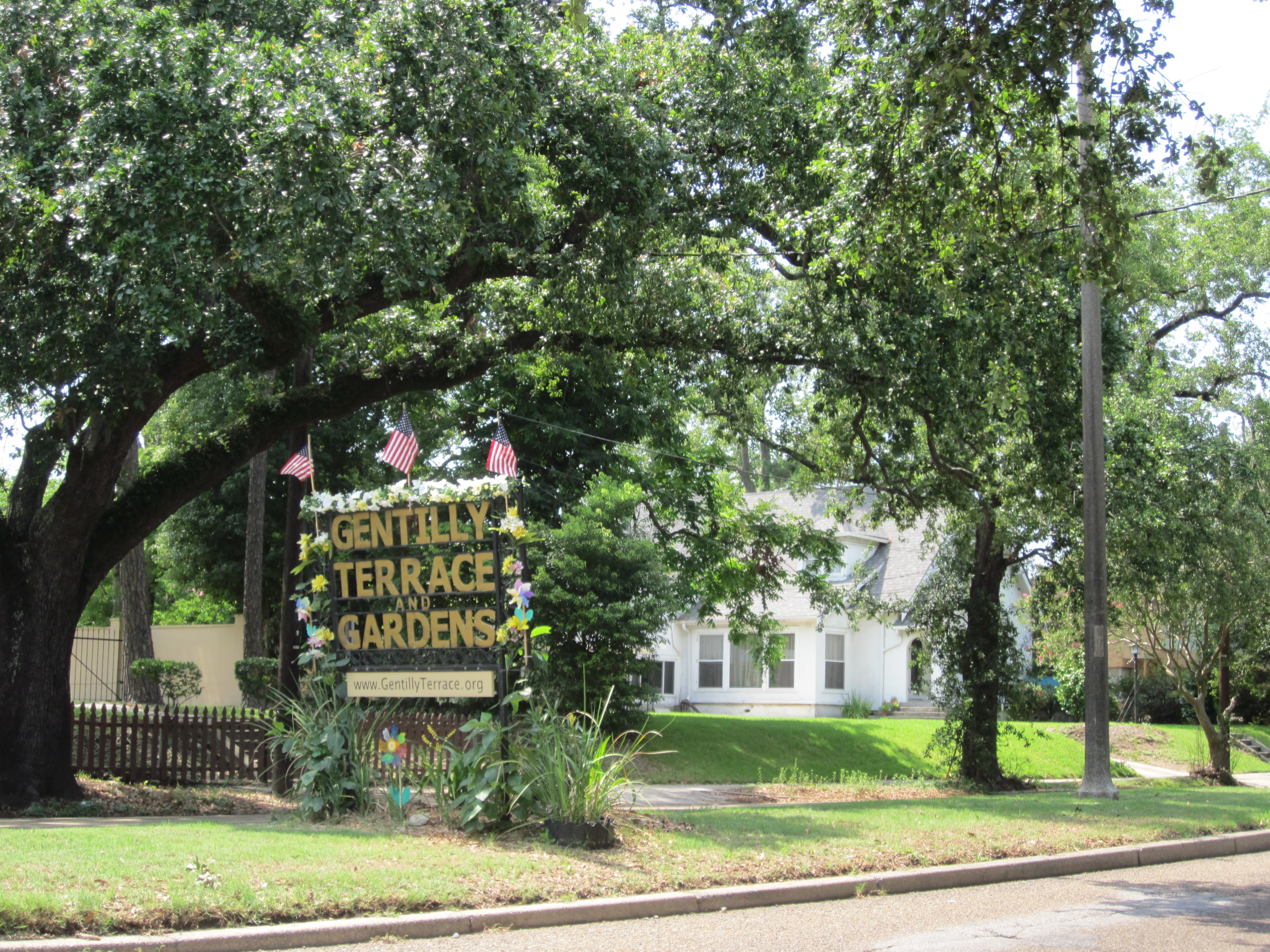
- Interactive map of Gentilly Terrace
- Coordinates: 30°00′10″N 90°03′10″W
- Country: United States
- State: Louisiana
- City: New Orleans
- Planning District: District 6, Gentilly District

Government
  - Mayor: Helena Moreno

Area
  - Total: 1.21 sq mi (3.1 km^{2})
  - Land: 1.21 sq mi (3.1 km^{2})
  - Water: 0.00 sq mi (0 km^{2})
- Elevation: 0 ft (0 m)

Population (2010)
  - Total: 3,745
  - Density: 3,100/sq mi (1,200/km^{2})
- Time zone: UTC-6 (CST)
  - Summer (DST): UTC-5 (CDT)
- Area code: 504

Gentilly Terrace is a neighborhood of the city of New Orleans. A subdistrict of the Gentilly District Area, its boundaries as defined by the City Planning Commission are: Filmore Avenue to the north, People's Avenue to the east, Gentilly Boulevard (US 90) to the south and Elysian Fields Avenue to the west. Gentilly Terrace may be further divided into Gentilly Terrace & Gardens, Edgewood Park and Fairmont Park, all three of which possess organized, distinct, and active neighborhood associations.

== Geography ==
Gentilly Terrace is located at 30°00′10″N 90°03′10″W and has an elevation of 0 feet (0.0 m). According to the United States Census Bureau, the district has a total area of 1.21 square miles (3.1 km^{2}). 1.21 square miles (3.1 km^{2}) of which is land and 0.00 square miles (0.0 km^{2}) (0.0%) of which is water.

=== Adjacent Neighborhoods ===
- Milneburg (north)
- Gentilly Woods (east)
- Desire Area (east)
- St. Roch (south)
- Dillard (west)
- St. Anthony (west)
- Edgewood Park (south)

=== Boundaries ===
Orleans Parish defines the boundaries of Gentilly Terrace as these streets: Filmore Avenue, People's Avenue, Gentilly Boulevard and Elysian Fields Avenue.

== Demographics ==
As of the census of 2000, there were 10,542 people, 4,258 households, and 2,783 families residing in the neighborhood. The population density was 8,712 /mi^{2} (3,401 /km^{2}).

As of the census of 2010, there were 8,210 people, 3,351 households, and 2,158 families residing in the neighborhood.

== Education ==
New Orleans Public Schools supervises the two public elementary schools within the neighborhood, while Brother Martin High School offers an all-boys, Catholic education for grades 8–12. There are no public high schools within Gentilly Terrace.

Schools within Gentilly Terrace:

- Audubon Gentilly Elementary School (operated by Audubon Charter Schools/FAME, Inc.)
- Mary McLeod Bethune at Stuart Bradley Elementary School
- Brother Martin High School (operated by the Catholic Brothers of the Sacred Heart)

Nearby public high schools:

- Benjamin Franklin High School (New Orleans) (operated by Advocates for Academic Excellence in Education, Inc.)
- The Delores Taylor Arthur School For Young Men (operated by Lyceum Schools, Inc.)
- John F. Kennedy High School at Lake Area (operated by New Beginnings School Foundation)
- McDonogh 35 College Preparatory High School

Nearby private schools:

- Holy Cross School (New Orleans)

== See also ==
- New Orleans neighborhoods
- Gentilly, New Orleans

https://beacon.schneidercorp.com/FileData/OrleansParishLA/AssessmentAreaMaps/GENTILLY%20TERRACE.pdf
