= St. Bernard Projects =

- New Orleans Neighborhood
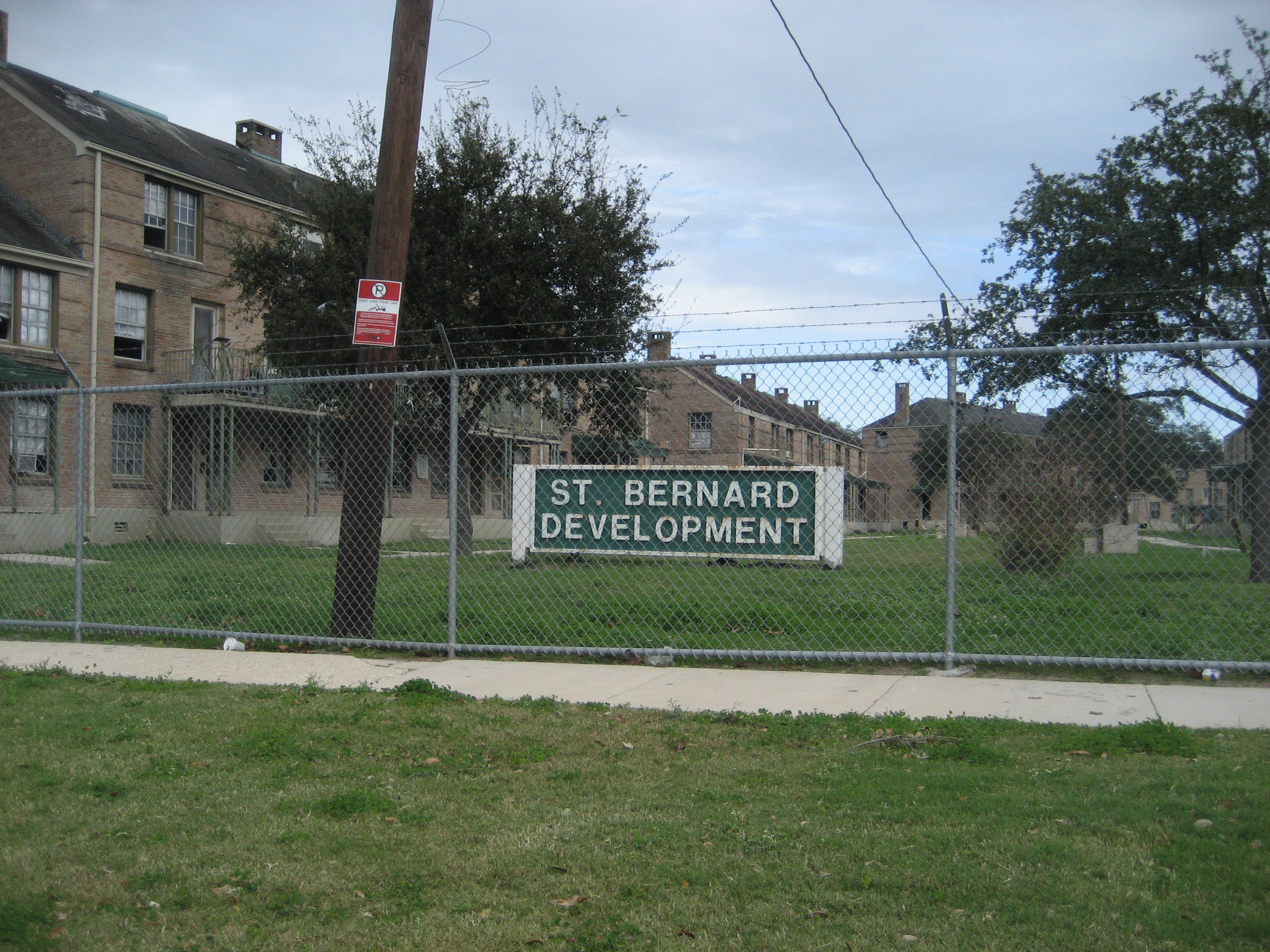
- Interactive map of St. Bernard Projects
- Coordinates: 29°59′49″N 90°04′46″W
- Country: United States
- State: Louisiana
- City: New Orleans
- Planning District: District 4, Mid-City District

Area
  - Total: 0.36 sq mi (0.93 km^{2})
  - Land: 0.36 sq mi (0.93 km^{2})
  - Water: 0.00 sq mi (0 km^{2})
- Elevation: 0 ft (0 m)

Population (2010)
  - Total: 17
  - Density: 47/sq mi (18/km^{2})
- Time zone: UTC-6 (CST)
  - Summer (DST): UTC-5 (CDT)
- Area code: 504

St. Bernard Projects was a housing project in the city of New Orleans. A subdistrict of the Mid-City District Area, its boundaries as defined by the New Orleans City Planning Commission were: Harrison Avenue to the north, Paris Avenue to the east, Lafreniere Street and Florida Avenue to the south and Bayou St. John to the west.

== Geography ==
Fairgrounds is located at 29°59′49″N 90°04′46″W and has an elevation of 0 feet (0.0 m). According to the United States Census Bureau, the district has a total area of 0.36 square miles (0.9 km^{2}). 0.36 square miles (0.9 km^{2}) of which is land and 0.00 square miles (0.0 km^{2}) (0.0%) of which is water.

=== Adjacent neighborhoods ===
- Filmore (north)
- Dillard (east)
- St. Roch (south)
- Fairgrounds (south)
- City Park (west)

=== Boundaries ===
The City Planning Commission defines the boundaries of St. Bernard Projects as these streets: Harrison Avenue, Paris Avenue, Lafreniere Street, Florida Avenue and Bayou St. John.

== Demographics ==
As of the census of 2000, there were 6,427 people, 2,020 households, and 1,576 families living in the neighborhood. The population density was 17,853 /mi^{2} (7,141 /km^{2}).

As of the census of 2010, there were 974 people, 403 households, and 231 families living in the neighborhood.

== History ==
Located in the city's 7th Ward, the complex was built over a few decades, beginning in the 1940s. It has the distinction of being the 2nd largest housing project in the city. Like most public housing developments, it was not a very safe complex as it became a battle ground for drug dealers during the height of the Crack epidemic in the late 1980s. It was once nicknamed "Dodge City" due to wild shootouts that occurred between rival gangs. Between 2002 and 2003, St. Bernard had a total of 25 homicides, 13 slayings in 2002 and 12 in 2003. Many of the residents blamed HANO for displacing other residents from other housing projects for the rise in murders. After Hurricane Katrina the project closed and demolition began two years later. In 2008, the project was completely torn down and rebuilt as Columbia Parc, a mixed-income neighborhood.

== See also ==
- New Orleans neighborhoods
