= Milneburg =

Coordinates: 30.032°N 90.062°W

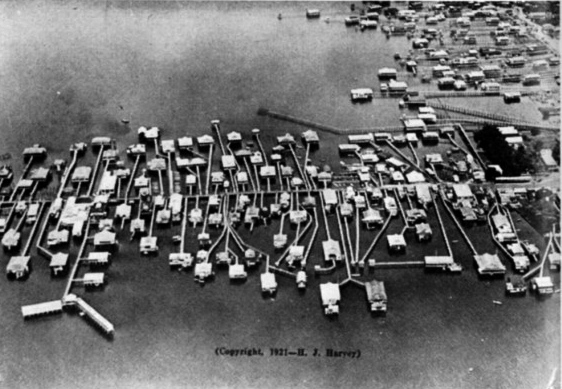
Aerial photograph of a section of Milneburg, 1921

Milneburg was a town on the southern shore of Lake Pontchartrain in Louisiana that was absorbed into the city of New Orleans. A neighborhood to the south of this area is still sometimes known by this name; the former location of Milneburg is now in the Lake Terrace/Lake Oaks, New Orleans section, mostly under the current campus of the University of New Orleans.

== History ==
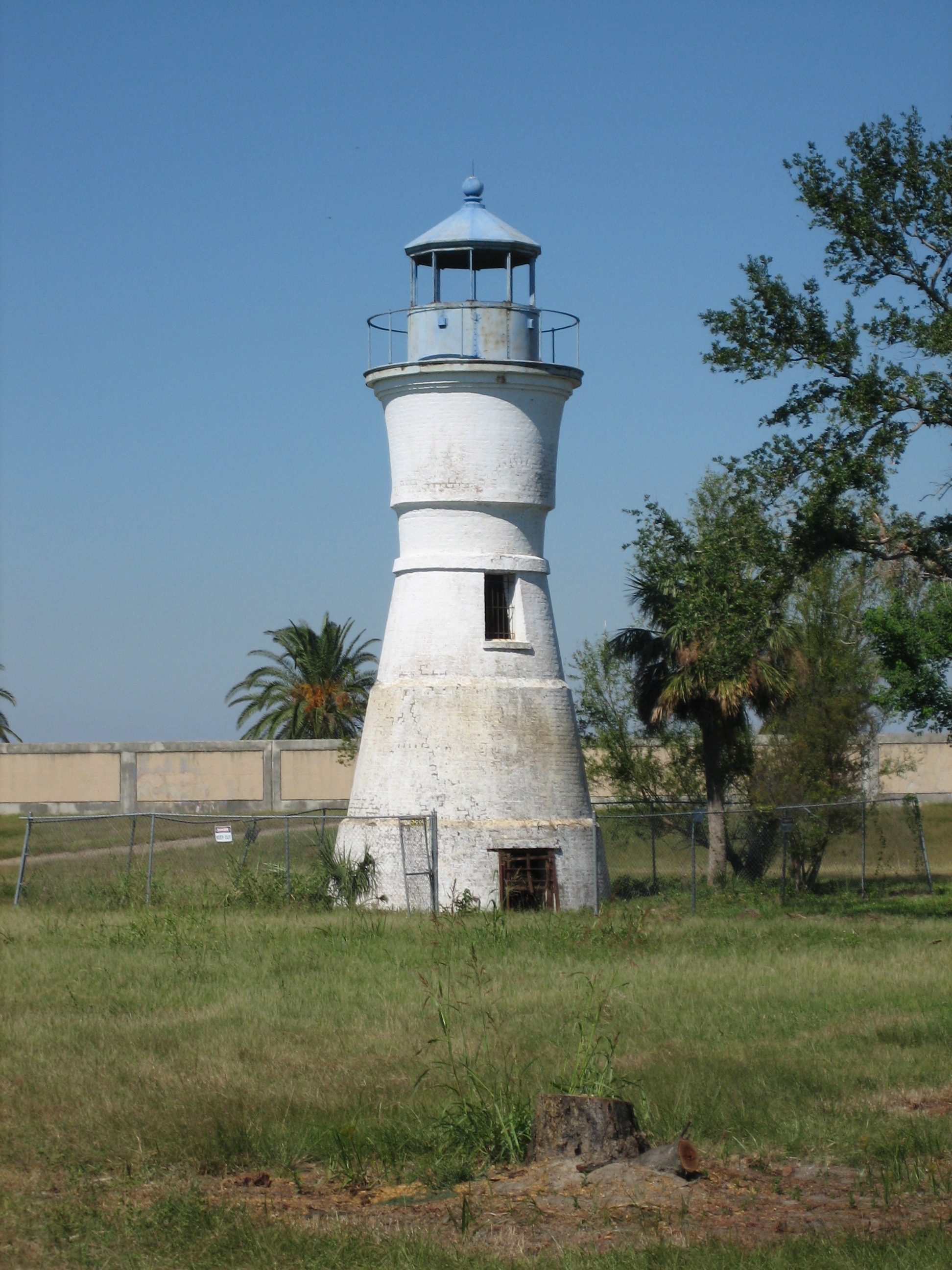
This now land-locked lighthouse was at the end of Milneburg pier before the land around it was reclaimed. (This 1855 brick lighthouse replaced an earlier wooden one from 1832.)

Milneburg was named for landowner-developer Alexander Milne. However local pronunciation came to call it "Mill-en-burg" or "Mil-lan-burg" instead of "Miln-burg", and the name has often been seen in print misspelled Milenberg and variations. Early on it was officially designated Port Pontchartrain, but the "Milneburg" name soon replaced this for all uses except for United States Coast Guard designation of the lighthouse there, which continued to be listed as "Port Pontchartrain Lighthouse" to 1929.

In the early 19th century Milneburg was connected to the city of New Orleans, which was then limited to the riverfront area, by Elysian Fields Avenue. In 1830 it was decided to build the region's first railway along this route, and the Pontchartrain Rail-Road began steam locomotive transport of people and cargo along the 5-mile (8.0 km) route on 23 April 1831. A long pier was built into the shallows of the lake, with a portion of the rail line running atop it, enabling ocean-going ships to dock at Milneburg. The port boomed, and hotels, saloons, bath houses, and resorts were built around it, mostly atop high wooden piers in the shallows of the lake, connected by a network of pier-like wooden boardwalks.

The importance of Milneburg in shipping declined in the late 19th century, but it remained an important resort. A series of "camps" (houses on piers in the shallows of the lake) were regularly rented out for parties, with fishing, picnics, and dancing to live bands.

Milneburg was important in the early development of jazz. Bands from different parts of the city and across racial lines would listen to each other and try to outdo each other here. Musician Sharkey Bonano grew up in Milneburg, and the area is commemorated in the New Orleans Rhythm Kings tune "Milenburg Joys" which has remained a jazz standard.

In the 1920s and 1930s a project to dredge new land on what had been the shallows of Lake Pontchartrain extended the shoreline out, and that was the end of old Milneburg. The Pontchartrain Beach amusement park was built on what had been the center of Milneburg. Later the University of New Orleans was established nearby.

The neighborhood now designated as "Milneburg" by the New Orleans Planning Commission is actually to the south and inland of the historic Milneburg; see Milneburg, New Orleans, for the modern neighborhood.
