= Neighborhoods in New Orleans =

The city planning commission for New Orleans divided the city into 13 planning districts and 73 distinct neighborhoods in 1980. Although initially in the study 68 neighborhoods were designated, and increased by the City Planning Commission to 76 in October 2001 based on census data, most planners, neighborhood associations, researchers, and journalists have since widely adopted 73 as the number and can even trace the number back to the early 1900s. While most of these assigned boundaries match with traditional local designations, some others differ from common traditional use. This is a result of the city planning commission's wish to divide the city into sections for governmental planning and zoning purposes without crossing United States census tract boundaries. While most of the listed names have been in common use by New Orleanians for generations, some designated names are rarely heard outside the planning commission's usage.

== East Bank ==
=== French Quarter / CBD, Warehouse (Districts 1a & 1b) ===
Sources:

- French Quarter also called Vieux Carré
- Central Business District

=== Central City / Garden District Area (District 2) ===
- Central City
- East Riverside
- Garden District
- Irish Channel
- Lower Garden District
- Milan
- St. Thomas
- Touro
- Faubourg Lafayette
- Faubourg Livaudais

=== Uptown / Carrollton Area (District 3) ===
- Audubon, also known as University
- Black Pearl
- Broadmoor
- Dixon
- East Carrollton
- Freret
- Hollygrove
- Leonidas, also called West Carrollton
- Fontainebleau, also called Marlyville
- Uptown
- West Riverside

=== Mid-City Area (District 4) ===
- Bayou St. John
- B.W. Cooper, formerly Calliope Projects
- Fairgrounds
- Gert Town
- Zion City, New Orleans
- Iberville Development (note: This area was built on the site of the infamous Storyville neighborhood.)
- Mid-City
- Parkview
- Seventh Ward
- St. Bernard Projects
- Tremé/Lafitte
- Tulane/Gravier

=== Lakeview Area (District 5) ===
- City Park
- Lakeshore/Lake Vista
- Lakeview
- Lakewood
  - Country Club Gardens
- Navarre
- West End

=== Gentilly Area (District 6) ===
- Dillard
- Filmore
- Gentilly Terrace
- Gentilly Woods
- Lake Terrace/Lake Oaks
- Milneburg
- Pontchartrain Park
- St. Anthony

=== Marigny, Bywater, St. Claude, St. Roch, Desire (District 7) ===
Sources:

- Bywater
- Desire Area
- New Desire Projects: Abundance Square
- Faubourg Marigny
- Florida Area
- Florida Projects
- St. Claude
  - Musicians' Village
- St. Roch

=== Lower Ninth Ward Area/Holy Cross (District 8) ===
Sources:

- Holy Cross
- Lower Ninth Ward

== Eastern New Orleans ==
=== New Orleans East (District 9) ===
- Little Woods, also called Edge Lake
- Pines Village
- Plum Orchard
- Read Boulevard East
- Read Boulevard West
- West Lake Forest

=== Village de L'Est (District 10) ===
- Village de L'Est
- Michoud

=== Venetian Isles / Lake Catherine (District 11) ===
- Viavant/Venetian Isles
- Lake Catherine

== West Bank ==
=== Algiers Area (District 12) ===
- Algiers Point
- U.S. Naval Support Area
- Aurora, also called Old Aurora; includes Huntlee Village and Walnut Bend
- Behrman, New Orleans
- Fischer Housing Development
- McDonogh, formerly called McDonoghville
- Tall Timbers / Brechtel
- New Aurora (Includes River Park, Cut Off, and Lower Coast Algiers)
- Christopher Homes Housing Development

=== English Turn Area (District 13) ===
- English Turn

== Latitude and longitude of neighborhoods ==
Neighborhood	Longitude	Latitude
U.S. NAVAL BASE	-90.02609253	29.94608469
ALGIERS POINT	-90.0516057	29.95246187
WHITNEY	-90.04235744	29.94720026
AUDUBON	-90.12145042	29.93299437
OLD AURORA	-89.9953° W	29.92444011
B. W. COOPER	-90.09175301	29.95177397
BAYOU ST. JOHN	-90.08651733	29.97607064
BEHRMAN	-90.02643585	29.9348167
BLACK PEARL	-90.13488293	29.93589521
BROADMOOR	-90.10381222	29.9465681
MARLYVILLE - FONTAINEBLEAU	-90.11346817	29.95300103
GERT TOWN	-90.10582924	29.96028871
MID-CITY	-90.09939194	29.97040133
ST. CLAUDE	-90.03926754	29.97181404
CENTRAL BUSINESS DISTRICT	-90.07445812	29.95002632
FRENCH QUARTER	-90.06437302	29.95883865
CENTRAL CITY	-90.086689	29.93946537
LAKE CATHERINE	-89.76104736	30.08810775
VILLAGE DE LEST	-89.90112305	30.07325354
VIAVANT - VENETIAN ISLES	-89.945755	30.00311157
NEW AURORA - ENGLISH TURN	-89.94197845	29.90732938
TALL TIMBERS - BRECHTEL	-90.01338959	29.91030537
FISCHER DEV	-90.04154205	29.93239931
McDONOGH	-90.05141258	29.94340726
LOWER GARDEN DISTRICT	-90.06814957	29.93485389
ST. THOMAS DEV	-90.07098198	29.92436572
EAST RIVERSIDE	-90.09432793	29.91960476
IRISH CHANNEL	-90.08565903	29.91633148
TOURO	-90.09544373	29.923845
MILAN	-90.09836197	29.93254808
UPTOWN	-90.10788918	29.92644857
WEST RIVERSIDE	-90.11672974	29.91618269
EAST CARROLLTON	-90.12694359	29.94474598
FRERET	-90.1071167	29.93715966
GARDEN DISTRICT	-90.08505821	29.92793629
LEONIDAS	-90.13097763	29.95359597
HOLLYGROVE	-90.12299538	29.96727842
TULANE - GRAVIER	-90.08522987	29.95961945
TREME - LAFITTE	-90.07441521	29.96727842
SEVENTH WARD	-90.06651878	29.97642379
MARIGNY	-90.05587578	29.96504771
ST. ROCH	-90.05209923	29.98214852
DIXON	-90.11321068	29.97151663
LAKEWOOD	-90.1199913	29.98549398
NAVARRE	-90.11037827	29.98846764
CITY PARK	-90.09372711	29.99917205
LAKEVIEW	-90.10831833	30.00660499
WEST END	-90.11861801	30.01366576
LAKESHORE - LAKE VISTA	-90.09784698	30.02325275
FILMORE	-90.07707596	30.01054422
ST. BERNARD AREA	-90.08016586	29.99523236
DILLARD	-90.06591797	29.99865172
ST. ANTHONY	-90.06574631	30.01515218
LAKE TERRACE & OAKS	-90.06420135	30.02867753
MILNEBURG	-90.054245	30.01916539
PONTCHARTRAIN PARK	-90.03931046	30.0219894
GENTILLY WOODS	-90.03707886	30.00994963
GENTILLY TERRACE	-90.05235672	30.00370621
DESIRE AREA	-90.03330231	29.99389432
FLORIDA AREA	-90.03742218	29.98021553
FLORIDA DEV	-90.03252983	29.98170245
LOWER NINTH WARD	-90.01304626	29.96891424
BYWATER	-90.0302124	29.96534514
HOLY CROSS	-90.01785278	29.95508328
PINES VILLAGE	-90.02214432	30.01916539
PLUM ORCHARD	-90.00188828	30.01604402
READ BLVD WEST	-89.97922897	30.02005719
READ BLVD EAST	-89.95519638	30.03551382
WEST LAKE FOREST	-89.99210358	30.0270427
LITTLE WOODS	-89.98386383	30.04190384
FAIRGROUNDS	-90.0794363	29.98621882
IBERVILLE	-90.07368565	29.95949861

== Other divisions and designations ==
There are a number of traditional and historic divisions of New Orleans which may still be commonly heard of in conversation, but which do not correspond with New Orleans City Planning Commission designations.

The 19th-century division of the city along the axis of Canal Street into downtown and uptown is a prime example. Various areas of the modern city which were separate towns in the past, such as Algiers and Carrollton, continue to be spoken of – but now as neighborhoods. The large area to the east of the Industrial Canal and north of the Mississippi River-Gulf Outlet Canal, little developed until the last third of the 20th century, is often referred to as Eastern New Orleans (or "New Orleans East", although that term usually refers to a smaller subset of the area).

Another example is the use of the Wards as a means of neighborhood identification for the city's residents. Originally created in 1805 with only 7 wards designated, there now are 17 in total. Socially among locals the wards are divided by the ones located "uptown" and the ones located "downtown". Later in the 1980s, there was a rise in the use of them as cultural identifiers with the emergence of bounce music and the recognition of the different dialects within them.

== See also ==
- Buildings and architecture of New Orleans
- Downtown New Orleans
- Uptown New Orleans
- Wards of New Orleans
- Housing Authority of New Orleans
- List of streets of New Orleans
