= London Avenue Canal =

Canal in Louisiana, United States

Coordinates: 30.010767°N 90.069222°W

The London Avenue Canal is a drainage canal in New Orleans, Louisiana, used for pumping rain water into Lake Pontchartrain. The canal runs through the 7th Ward of New Orleans from the Gentilly area to the Lakefront. It is one of the three main drainage canals responsible for draining rainwater from the main basin of New Orleans. The London Avenue Canal's flood walls built atop earthen levees breached on both sides during Hurricane Katrina in 2005.

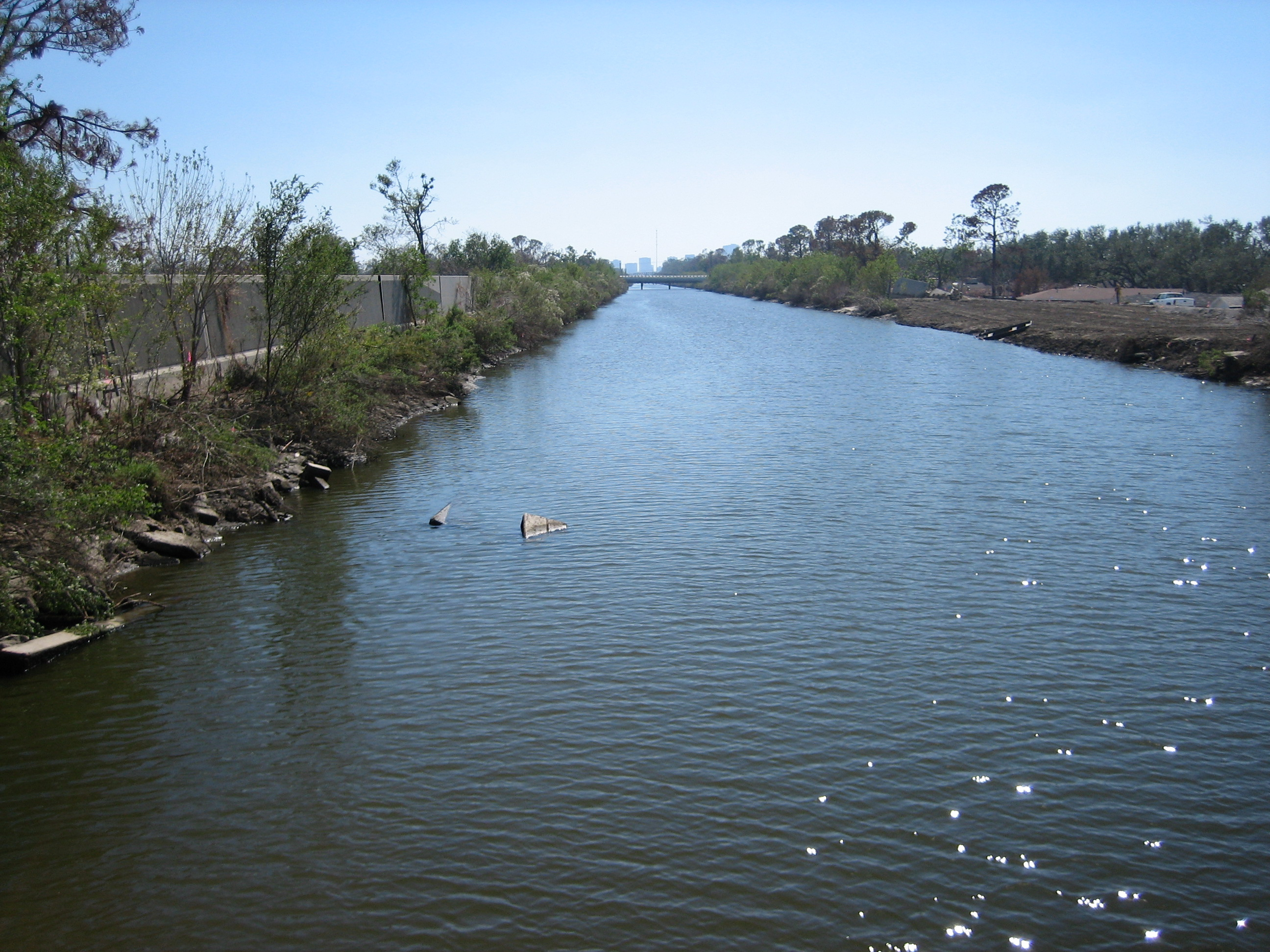
London Avenue Canal; view from Robert E. Lee Bridge looking riverwards, 19 October 2005. Intact concrete flood wall atop levee visible at left. At right, incompletely repaired upper breach visible.

== History ==
The canal was constructed in the first half of the 19th century, commissioned by Alexander Milne, who owned large tracts of land that would later become part of the city of New Orleans but were at the time mostly swamp. The canal originally served to commerce of small boat traffic from Lake Pontchartrain to the "Back of Town" section of New Orleans in addition to limited swamp drainage. By the end of the 19th century, with most commerce shifted to other canals specifically designed for shipping, the London Avenue Canal had achieved its modern function to take flow of drainage mechanically pumped from the streets of the city. However early on this was mostly just water from the river-side of the Canal head; most of the area along the Canal in back of Gentilly Ridge remained cypress swamp with a few cow-pastures subject to periodic flooding.

In the early 20th century the old "London Avenue Machine" steam-pump at the head of the Canal was replaced with a more efficient system of high capacity pumps designed by A. Baldwin Wood. Residential development of the areas along the Canal in the Gentilly neighborhood (except along the highest ground along Gentilly Road itself) did not begin until after Wood's improved drainage system was operational. Dillard University was established beside the Canal.

In the 1930s, construction of levees along Lake Pontchartrain and the Paris Avenue Canal improved drainage further back along the canal's borders. With additional lift pumps in place in 1945, the full length of land along the canal all the way back to the lake was soon developed as residential neighborhoods. A major project of upgrading the floodwalls and bridges along the Canal was begun in 1999.

== Breaches during Hurricane Katrina ==
The London Avenue Canal Levee and floodwall breached on both sides during Hurricane Katrina in late August 2005 at surge levels more than four feet below design specifications. The east breach occurred around 6 to 7 a.m. and sent tons of sand and water into the neighborhood of Mirabeau (5000 Warrington Drive). The west breach occurred around 7 or 8 a.m. and flooded the adjacent neighborhood of Lake Vista (6100 Pratt Drive). The U.S. Army Corps of Engineers conducted expensive emergency efforts to fill the breaches in September; more flooding flowed from the incompletely patched canal during Hurricane Rita the next month, but not enough extent to cause any damage that was not already left from Hurricane Katrina. Water continued to flow from seepage in the temporary levee in lower breach in sufficient quantity to cover nearby streets as late as the first week of January, 2006. That month the Army Corps of Engineers finished temporary repairs of the canal breaches.

== Investigations into the Breaches ==
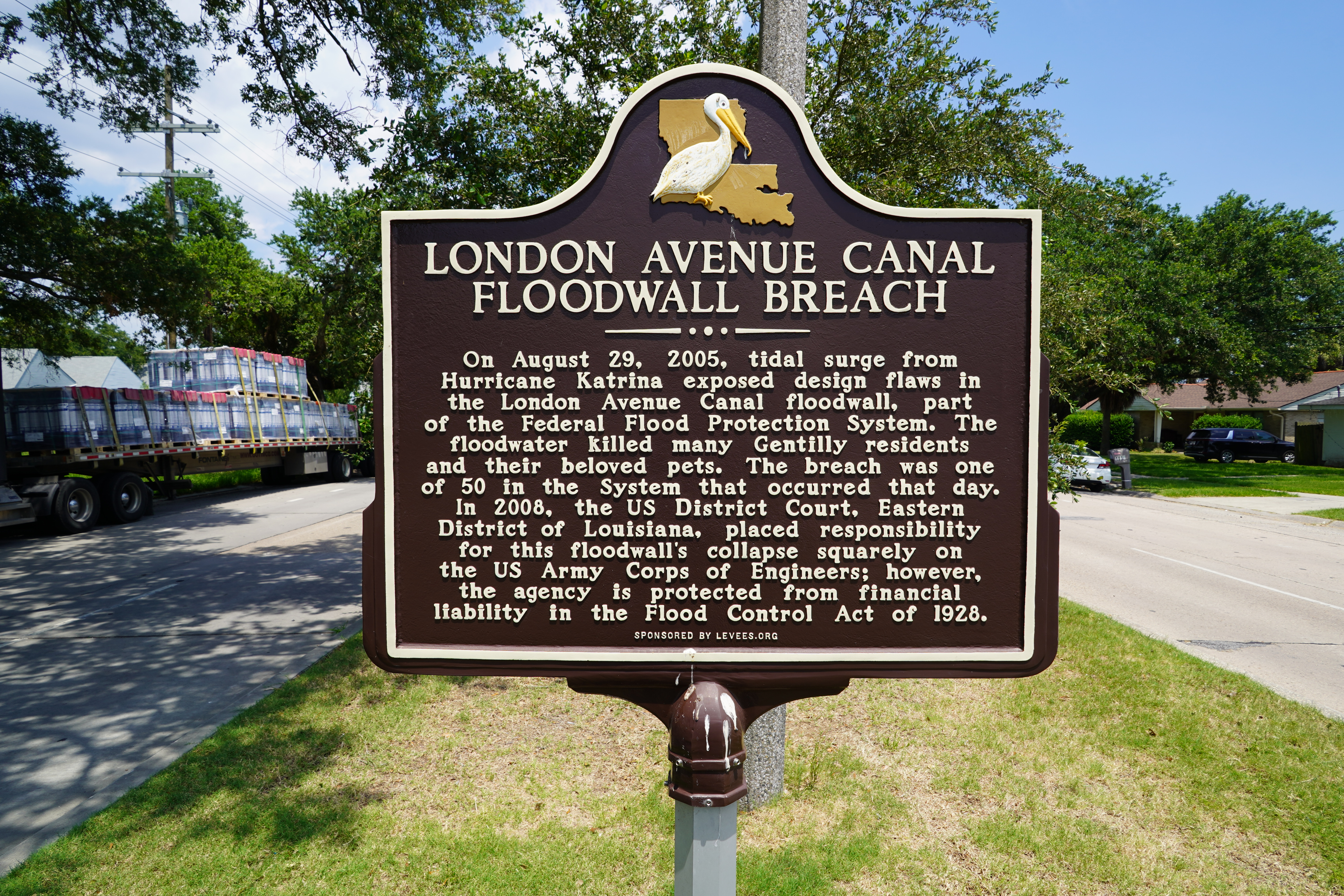
London Avenue Canal Memorial

In October 2005, the Army Corps of Engineers convened an investigation of the levee breaches that occurred during Hurricane Katrina called the Interagency Performance Evaluation Task Force (IPET). The members of the IPET confirmed that the canal floodwalls failed at significantly lower water level than the top of the floodwall due to faulty design. In August 2007, the Corps announced the results of an engineering analysis applying more stringent post-Katrina design criteria which showed the maximum safe load on some of the surviving floodwalls is only 7 feet (2.1 m) of water, which is half the original 14-foot (4.3 m) design intent.

According to an article published in the August 2015 issue of the official journal of the World Water Council, both the breaches were due to faulty design. The authors concluded that the Army Corps of Engineers had misinterpreted the results of a Sheet Pile Load test (E-99 Study) they conducted in the mid 1980s. The engineers had wrongly concluded that they could install sheet pilings at a depth of not more than 17 feet, rather than 31 to 46 feet. This switch to shorter sheet pilings saved the Army Corps millions but came at the expense of reduced engineering reliability.

In January 2008, Federal Judge Stanwood Duval of the US District Court for Eastern Louisiana held the US Army Corps of Engineers responsible for defects in the design of the concrete flood walls constructed in the levees of the London Avenue Canal; however, the agency could not be held financially liable due to sovereign immunity provided in the Flood Control Act of 1928.

Post-Katrina, the Army Corps has strengthened and enhanced the reliability of the levees and flood walls of the London Avenue Canal in the following ways: 1) gates with massive pump stations have been installed at the canal's mouth to Lake Pontchartrain, 2) the Army Corps has determined a “safe water” level in the canals which is lower than the height of the canal wall, 3) steel sheet pilings were driven to deeper depths, and 4) relief walls that act as “warning gauges” have been installed.

== See also ==
- Drainage in New Orleans
- Industrial Canal
- 17th Street Canal
- Effect of Hurricane Katrina on New Orleans
- U.S. Army Corps of Engineers civil works controversies (New Orleans)
