= Elysian Fields Avenue =

Highway in Louisiana

Louisiana Highway 3021
- Elysian Fields Avenue

Route information
- Maintained by Louisiana DOTD
- Length: 1.8 mi (2.9 km)
- Existed: 1955 renumbering–present

Major junctions
- South end: LA 39 / LA 46 in New Orleans
- I-10 in New Orleans; I-610 in New Orleans
- North end: US 90 in New Orleans

Location
- Country: United States
- State: Louisiana
- Parishes: Orleans

Highway system
- Louisiana State Highway System; Interstate; US; State; Scenic
← LA 3020	→ I-110

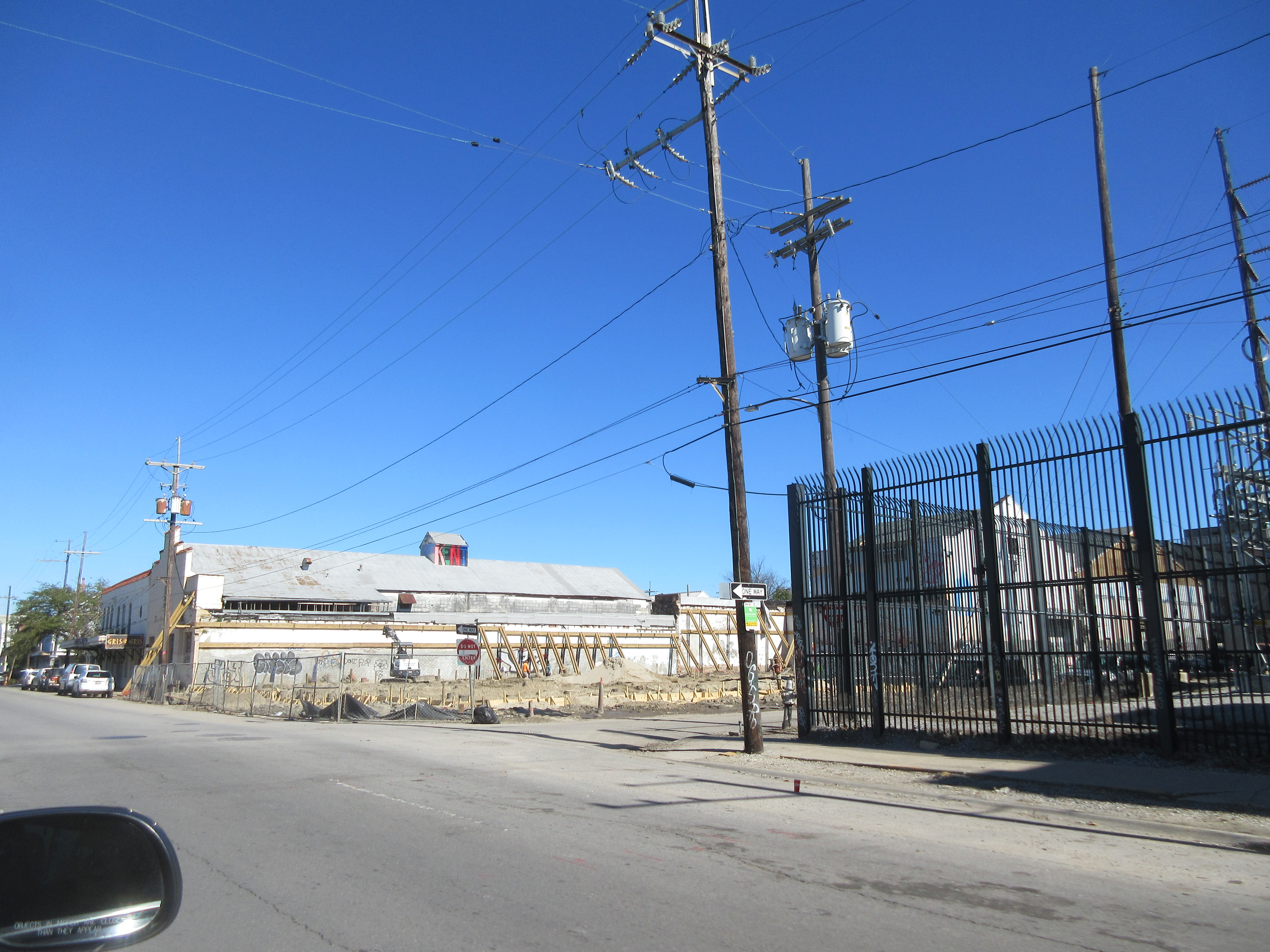
Elysian Fields Avenue New Orleans

Elysian Fields Avenue is a broad, straight avenue in New Orleans named after the Avenue des Champs-Élysées in Paris. It courses south to north from the Lower Mississippi River to Lake Pontchartrain, a distance of approximately 5 miles (8.0 km). The avenue intersects with Interstate 610, Interstate 10, and U.S. Highway 90, Gentilly Boulevard passing by Brother Martin High School. The part between North Claiborne Avenue (Louisiana Highway 39) and Gentilly Boulevard (U.S. Route 90) is Louisiana Highway 3021 (LA 3021); the piece from N. Claiborne Avenue south to St. Claude Avenue carries Louisiana Highway 46 (which turns east on St. Claude Avenue).

For more than half of its route, from the river to Gentilly Boulevard (U.S. Route 90), it is six lanes wide; the remainder north of Gentilly Boulevard is four lanes wide. Anchoring the lake end and river end (northern and southern termini) respectively are the University of New Orleans and the Esplanade Avenue Wharf.

The location of Elysian Fields Avenue originated in the early 19th century placement of a sawmill canal on the Marigny Plantation, which at that time was just outside New Orleans proper (the present French Quarter). In 1831 the Pontchartrain Railroad was built from that location straight to Lake Pontchartrain. The railroad carried both goods and passengers. Among the railroad's steady revenue sources was mail, which was carried from New Orleans to Lake Pontchartain for transfer to Mobile, Alabama-bound ships. The railroad, which came to be known locally as "Smoky Mary", operated until 1935. The tracks were removed in the 1950s.

== Lakeshore Drive ==
At the end of Elysian Fields where it meets the lake. Lakeshore Drive runs along the south shore of Lake Pontchartrain. It is a recreational park space along the lake used for sun bathing, running, swimming (Swimming is allowed only by the Seabrook Bridge and you can only swim to a certain point), fishing and crabbing on the seawall steps, and leisurely walks, etc. This space is used mostly by locals and residents of New Orleans.

== Public transit routes ==
Two RTA bus routes operated on Elysian Fields Avenue: one local (est. August 4, 1924; first known as Frenchmen, later, as of January 1957, just Elysian Fields [or Elysian Fields – Pont. Beach/UNO], and later, in January 1989, 55 Elysian Fields), the other an express (est. December 5, 1960, first known as Express 91 – Pontchartrain Beach via Elysian Fields, later 56 Elysian Fields Express).

== In popular culture ==
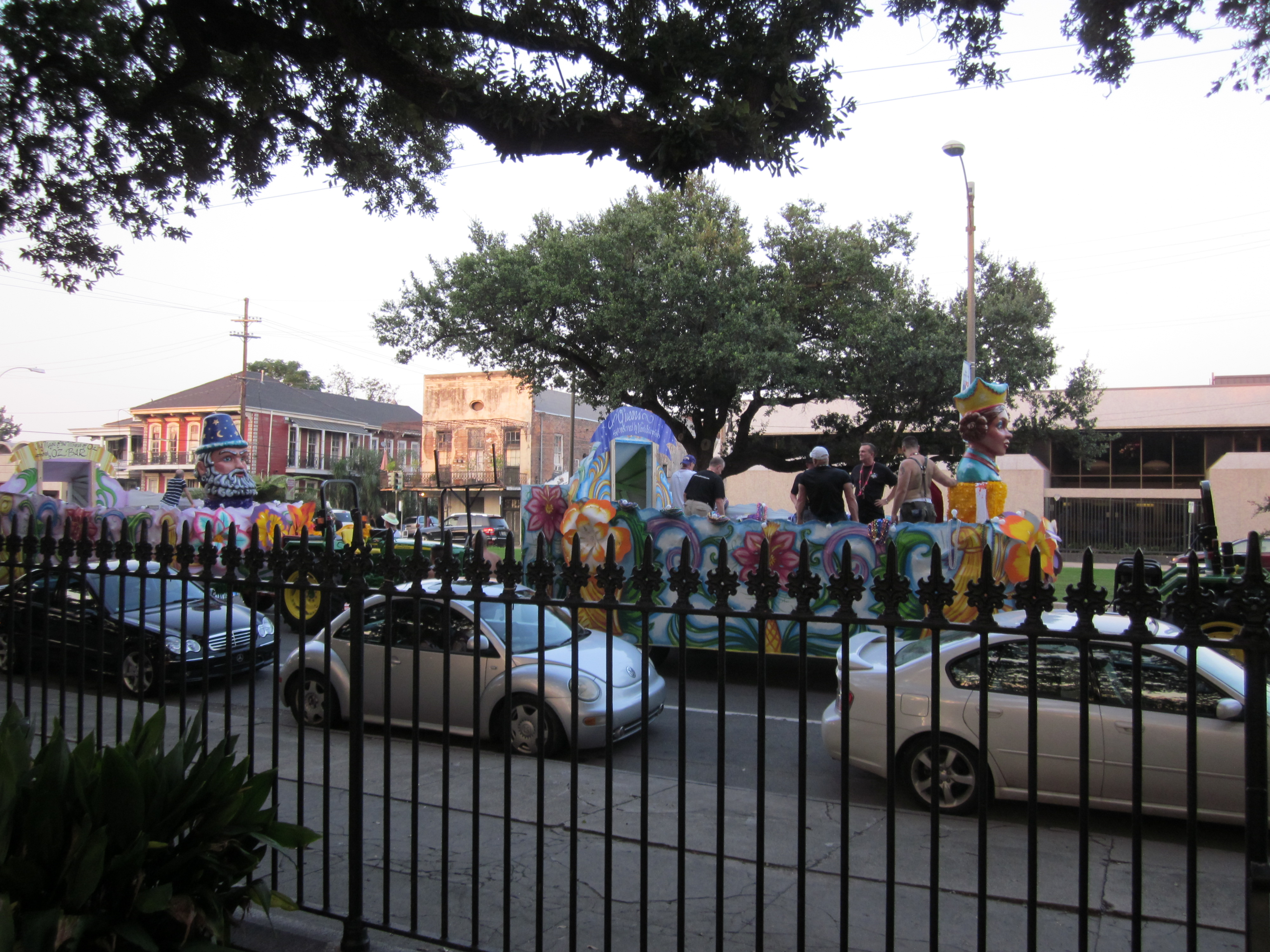
Southern Decadence parade on Elysian Fields

Elysian Fields is the setting for the 1947 Tennessee Williams play A Streetcar Named Desire. Williams presents the setting as multicultural and vibrant with Jazz culture and social life. The play's tragic heroine Blanche Dubois is "incongruous" to the setting, which Williams uses to highlight the cosmopolitan nature of the city in contrast to the decay of the Old South.

== Geographic coordinates ==
- 30.03037°N 90.061623°W – northern terminus at Lake Pontchartrain
- 29.999399°N 90.059095°W – Gentilly Boulevard
- 29.991067°N 90.0584°W – Interstate 610
- 29.980151°N 90.05673°W – Interstate 10
- 29.9615°N 90.0565°W – southern terminus at Mississippi River

== Major intersections ==
The entire highway is in New Orleans, Orleans Parish.

mi	km	Destinations	Notes
0.0	0.0	LA 39 (North Claiborne Avenue) / LA 46 east (Elysian Fields Avenue)	Southern terminus of LA 3021; Western terminus of LA 46
0.5	0.80	I-10 – Baton Rouge, Slidell	Exit 237 (I-10)
1.2	1.9	I-610 – Baton Rouge, Slidell	Exit 3 (I-610)
1.8	2.9	US 90 (Gentilly Boulevard)	Northern terminus of LA 3021
1.000 mi = 1.609 km; 1.000 km = 0.621 mi

== See also ==
- Brother Martin High School
