= Industrial Canal =

Canal in Louisiana, United States of America

Inner Harbor Navigation Canal Industrial Canal
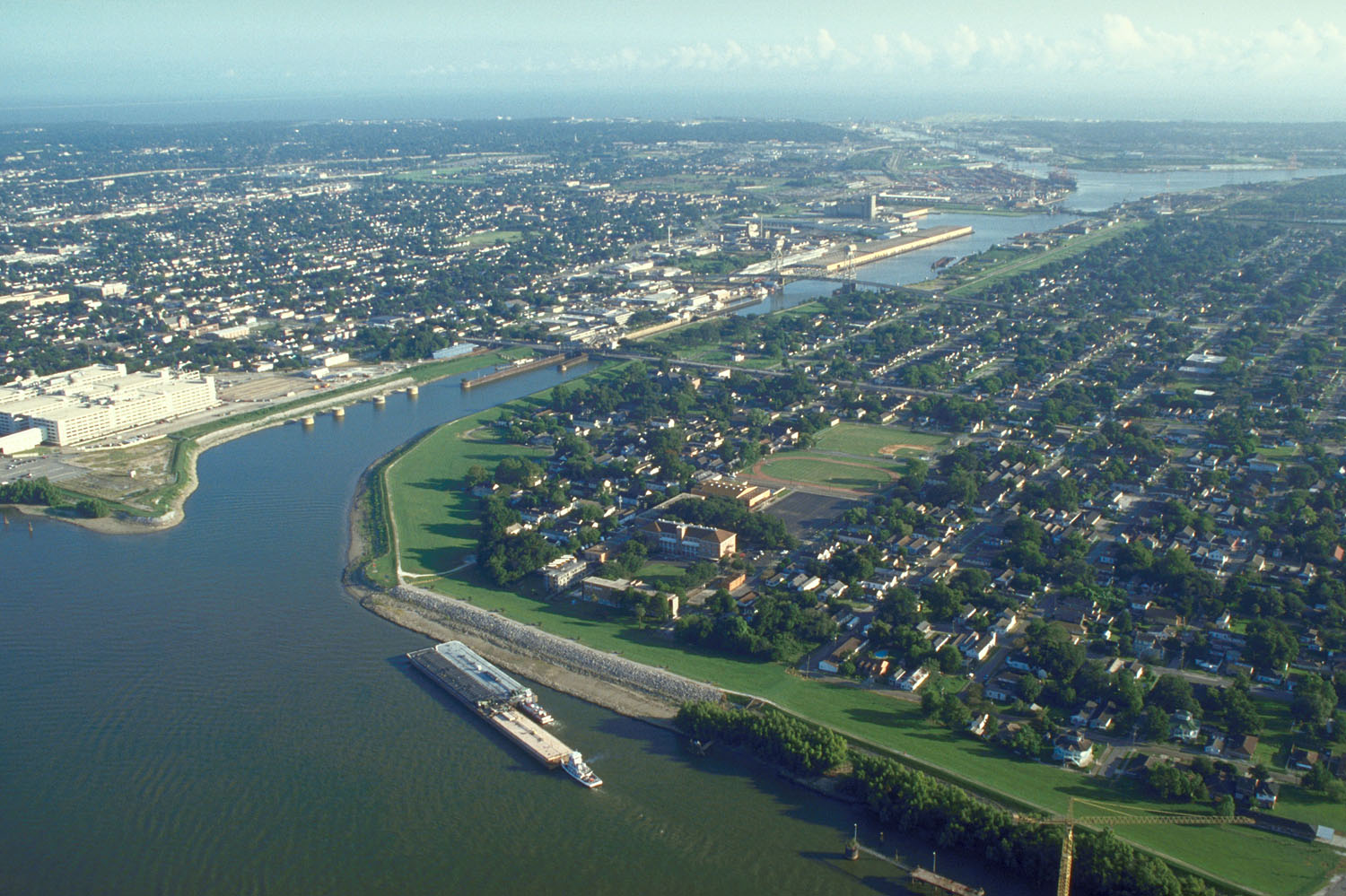
- The Industrial Canal from the river to the lake. The Mississippi is at lower left and Lake Pontchartrain is at top in the distance. View is to the northwest. Picture taken before August 29, 2005.
- Interactive map of Inner Harbor Navigation Canal; Industrial Canal
- Location: New Orleans, Louisiana
- Country: United States
- Coordinates: 30.01567°N 90.02927°W

Specifications
- Length: 5.5 miles (8.9 km) (originally 5.3 mi or 8.5 km)
- Lock length: 640 feet (200 m)
- Lock width: 75 ft (23 m)
- Maximum boat draft: 30 feet (9.1 m)
- Locks: 1 (Industrial Canal Lock)
- Total rise: 20 feet (6.1 m)
- Status: Open

History
- Date of act: 1914
- Construction began: 6 June 1918
- Date of first use: 5 May 1923

Geography
- Start point: Lake Pontchartrain
- End point: Lower Mississippi River
- Connects to: Gulf Intracoastal Waterway

The Industrial Canal is a 5.5-mile (8.9 km) waterway in New Orleans, Louisiana, United States. The waterway's proper name, as used by the U.S. Army Corps of Engineers and on NOAA nautical charts, is Inner Harbor Navigation Canal (IHNC). The more common "Industrial Canal" name is used locally, both by commercial mariners and by landside residents.

The canal connects the Mississippi River to Lake Pontchartrain. It separates New Orleans East from the rest of the city, and the Lower 9th Ward from the Upper 9th Ward. Approximately half of the waterway's course, from Industrial Lock to a point north of the Florida Avenue Bridge, is confluent with both the Gulf Intracoastal Waterway and the Mississippi River Gulf Outlet (MRGO).

The entirety of the canal passes through the 9th Ward of the city. Along the riverfront, the canal constitutes the boundary of the Upper 9th Ward on the upriver side of the canal and the Lower 9th Ward neighborhood on the downriver side. Near the lake, it is generally considered to be the eastern boundary of the Gentilly neighborhood and the western boundary of New Orleans East.

== History ==
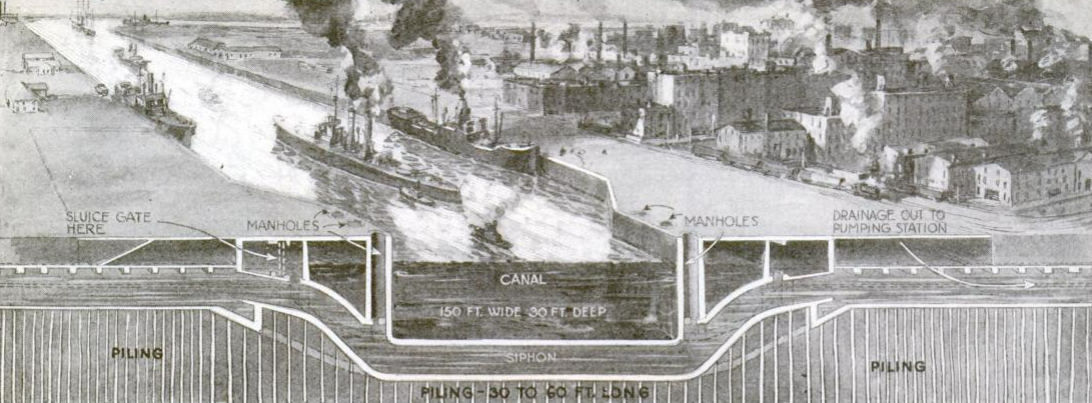
Diagram of the canal before its completion, 1920

The dream of a shipping canal connecting the Mississippi River to Lake Pontchartrain goes back to Spanish colonial times (1763–1803). The colonial era Carondelet Canal connected the back side of the French Quarter with the lake via Bayou St. John, but it was not extended to the river because of the differing levels of the river and the lake. Engineers confirmed that canal locks would be necessary.

Confluence of waterways This simplified diagram shows how the southern half of the Industrial Canal also serves as the channel for the Gulf Intracoastal Waterway and the Mississippi River-Gulf Outlet Canal (MRGO).

A canal proposed in the early 19th century was never built, but the right-of-way for the proposed waterway gave its name to the city's Canal Street.

In July 1914 the Louisiana State Government authorized the Port of New Orleans to build a deep-water shipping canal between the river and lake. Thereafter, a study was undertaken for the Port by Ford, Bacon and Davis Engineers, and the results were presented in its report of June 30, 1915. The report noted several driving factors behind the canal, including capitalizing on shipping opportunities anticipated with the recent construction of the Panama Canal and competing with the railroads by improving marine transportation and shipping. Five locations for the canal were presented, including one through the Carrollton neighborhood to the New Basin Canal, a second between Jackson Avenue and Canal Street connecting to the head of the New Basin Canal, a third through the French Quarter to the Carondelet Canal, a fourth at Press Street to Lake Pontchartrain, and a fifth through the Jackson Barracks to Lake Pontchartrain.

Each of the options was originally explored for barge traffic and based on the construction of locks at the Mississippi River that would provide 10 feet of draft over the sill. However, the report noted that the Press Street and Jackson Barracks options could be increased to accommodate ship drafts. In addition to the base option, three alternates were presented for the Press Street location. In addition to a lock with 10 feet over the sill, the alternates explored 15 feet, 30 feet, and 35 feet of draft. Ultimately, 30 feet was chosen and established.

In August 1917, a land tract previously occupied by the Ursuline Convent that included 700 feet of river frontage was offered for sale, several years after the Ursuline order moved from this site to their new location on State Street. The Port procured the property and announced the location of the locks and final canal alignment in May 1918.

Considerable land was expropriated in the downriver portion of the city. Toward the lake this was mostly little-developed swamp. Along the riverfront, though, buildings demolished to make room for the canal included homes and the Ursuline Convent, whose Dauphine Street facility was nearly a century old at that time.

Dredging of the canal began on 6 June 1918. The length from the lake to the lock near the river was constructed with a 30 foot (9 m) depth, with a width of 300 feet (90 m) at the top of the canal and at least 150 feet (45 m) at the bottom. The original lock system had 5 gates, a width of 74 feet (23 m), and a depth of 50 feet (15 m), with a capability to function to up to 20 feet (6 m) in difference of levels between the river and lake. The opening dedication ceremony was presided over by Louisiana Governor John M. Parker on 5 May 1923. The cost was 19 million dollars.

The original length of the canal was 5.3 miles (8.5 km) with a 1,600 foot (500 m) right-of way. The longer current length of 5.5 miles (8.9 km) is due to the extension of the lakeshore by dredging in the late 1920s.

After the opening of the canal, slips and docks were added along its length, allowing it to function as a harbor and industrial zone in addition to serving as a transit canal. With the inauguration of the Gulf Intracoastal Waterway (GIWW) in the 1930s, the Industrial Canal served as a channel linking the Lake Pontchartrain segment of the GIWW to its continuing segment, accessed via the Mississippi River. During World War II the Intracoastal Waterway was rerouted, and a newly excavated segment extending through the swamp west from the Rigolets joined the Industrial Canal at its approximate midway point between the river and the lake. In 1944, the federal government leased the Industrial Canal lock and the southern 2.1-mile (3.4-km) section of the canal and took over its operation and maintenance.

In the 1960s the Industrial Canal/Intracoastal Waterway junction was enlarged, in expectation of the anticipated surge in traffic resulting from the completion (1965) of the Mississippi River Gulf Outlet. Largely due to the failure of the Port of New Orleans' Centroport U.S.A. initiative (which envisioned the wholesale relocation of the port from wharfs along the Mississippi River to new facilities along the Intracoastal Waterway), this surge in traffic failed to materialize.

=== Hurricane damage ===
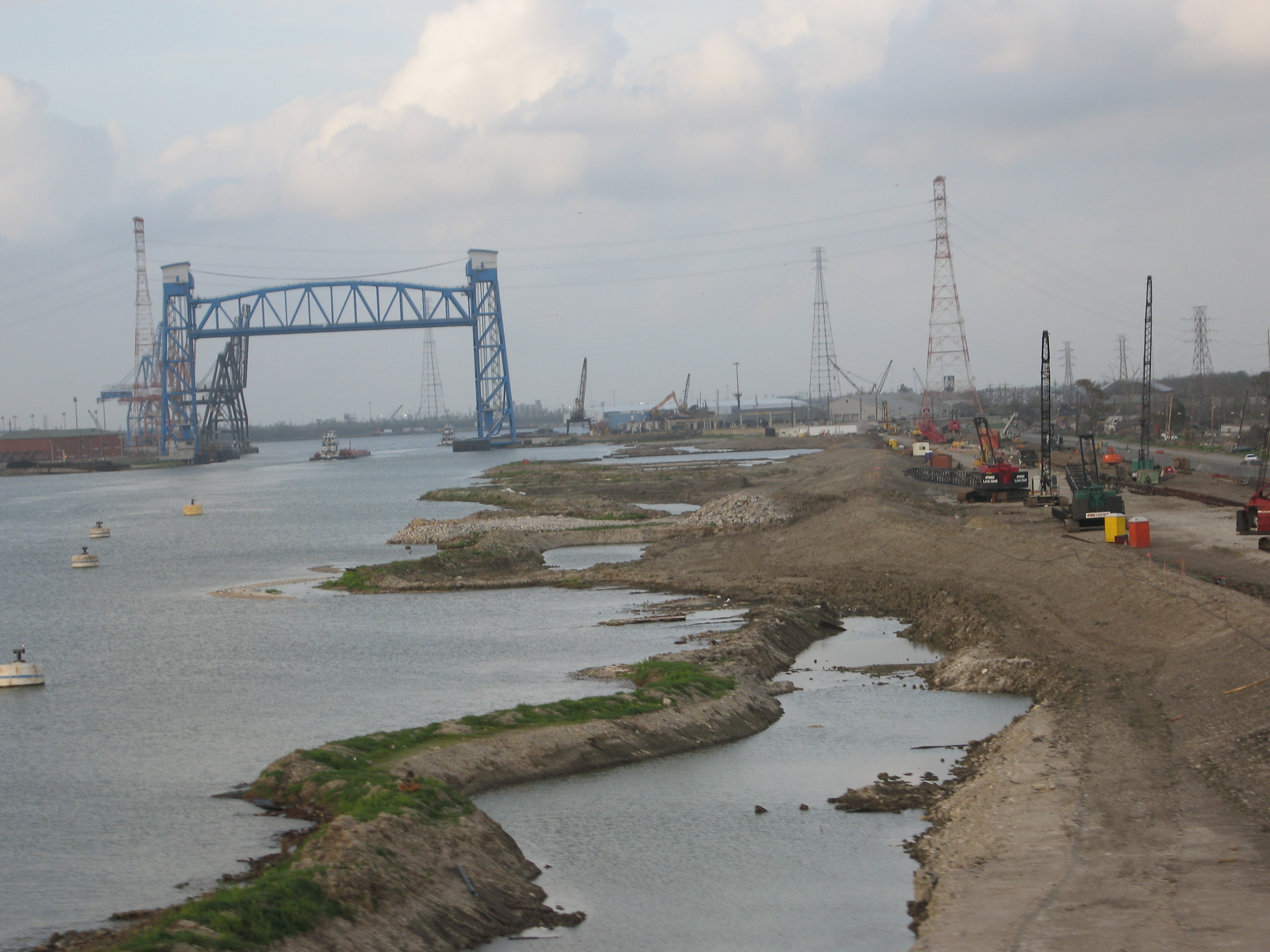
Post-Katrina temporary earthen levee under construction where a floodwall failed, with Florida Avenue Bridge in distance

A breach in the canal's levees resulted in the flooding of the Lower 9th Ward during Hurricane Betsy in 1965. Subsequently, concrete floodwalls were constructed to replace the levees.

In 2005, with the approach of Hurricane Katrina, storm surge funneled by the confluence of the GIWW's and MRGO's levees created multiple breaches in the canal's concrete floodwalls, including the spectacular failure of a quarter-mile length on the Lower 9th Ward side, resulting in catastrophic flooding. On the Upper 9th Ward side, the canal poured through a breach near Florida Avenue. On the opposite side, there were two breaches between Florida Avenue and Claiborne Avenue. A large barge, the ING 4727, floated through the breach closer to the river and was deposited in the Lower 9th Ward. The barge itself may have caused one or more of the breaches; this possibility is under investigation. The canal lock was functioning two days after Katrina hit, at first mostly for barges bringing in fill to repair the breaches. A month later Hurricane Rita reflooded recently drained areas along the canal by topping emergency fill at the breach sites.

== Civil engineering works ==
=== Seabrook Floodgate ===
Since Hurricane Katrina in 2005, proposals have been made to close the northern end of the canal by building a dam at the entrance to Lake Pontchartrain, as part of an effort to block storm surge. A subcommittee of the Bring New Orleans Back Commission has endorsed such a move. Since a dam would prohibit shipping between the lake and the canal, the US Army Corps of Engineers has designed a surge barrier, the IHNC Seabrook Floodgate Structure. Construction started in the fall of 2010, and although construction activities will continue beyond the Corps' projected June 1, 2011 deadline, a temporary cofferdam has been built to reduce risk to the area during the construction.

=== Lake Borgne Surge Barrier ===
In order to prevent a future storm surge from entering the IHNC via the GIWW from Lake Borgne, the IHNC Lake Borgne Surge Barrier was built near the confluence of the GIWW and MRGO. This $1.1 billion project was finished in 2013. The barrier has navigable gates in the GIWW and Bayou Bienvenue. These gates can be shut when a storm surge is expected.

=== Industrial Canal Lock ===
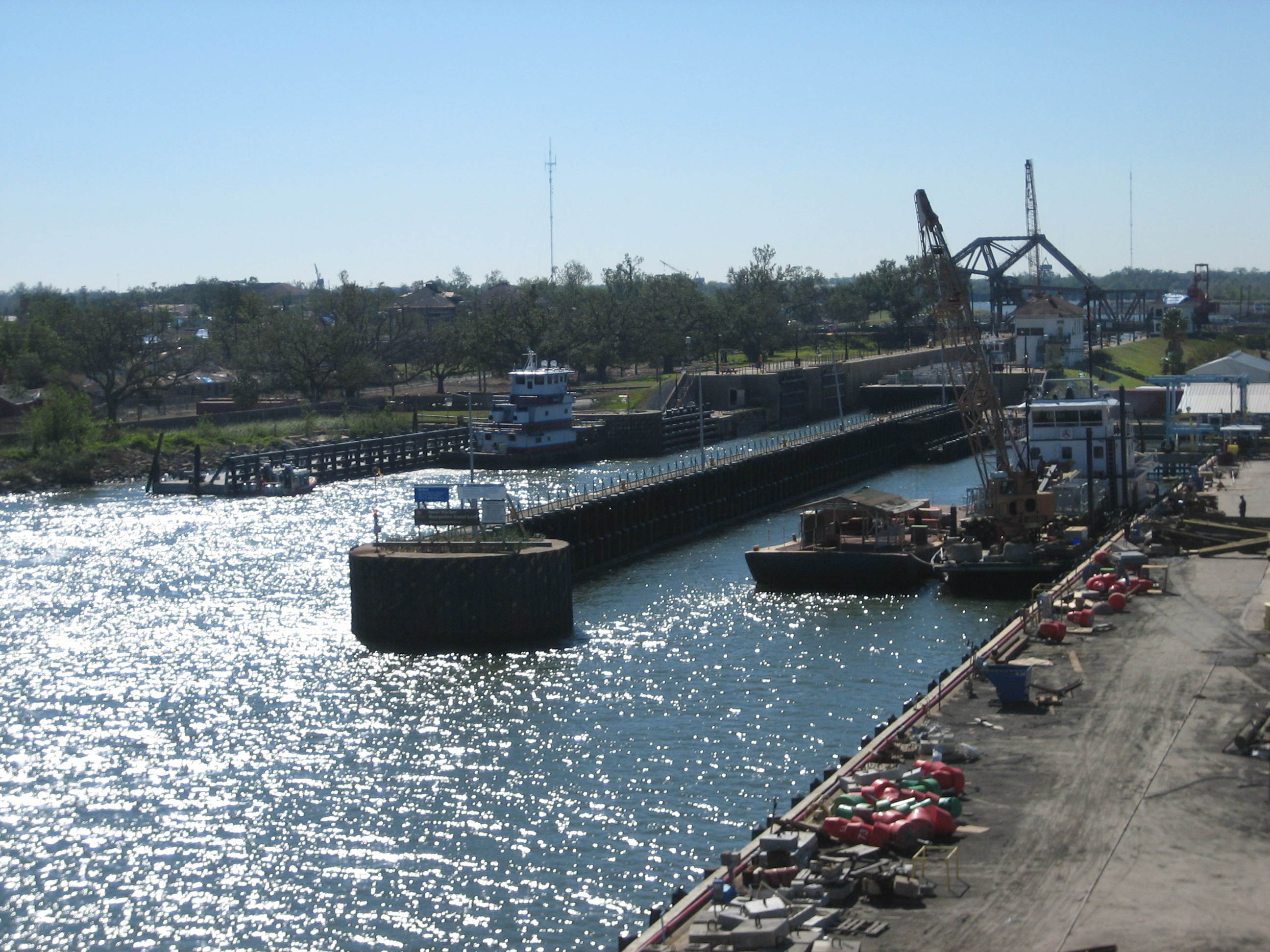
Canal locks as seen from the Claiborne Avenue Bridge looking towards the Mississippi River

Industrial Canal Lock provides a connection with the Mississippi River. Because it is shorter and narrower than most modern locks on the Mississippi River System, the 1920s vintage lock has become a bottleneck between the nation's two highest-tonnage waterways—the Mississippi and the Gulf Intracoastal Waterway.

The U.S. Army Corps of Engineers is engaged in a project to replace the canal's historic locks with larger modern locks sited to the north of Claiborne Avenue.

Maritime interests argue that in light of the closure of the MRGO, and the loss of the deepwater access it provided to the Gulf of Mexico, modern oceangoing vessels are unable to access the inner harbor of the Industrial Canal, permanently limiting the canal's utility as a site for shipyards and other industry requiring water access. Without a new lock, the port's France Road Container Terminal and Jourdan Road Wharf would also remain closed due to the inadequate deepwater access. Proponents of the new lock additionally cite dwindling barge traffic as evidence that the existing obsolete lock is choking off commerce. Opponents point to the same figures to support their contention that insufficient demand exists to justify the new lock. Neighborhood associations and environmental groups have fought the project and, on October 6, 2006, represented by the Tulane Environmental Law Clinic, the Holy Cross Neighborhood Association, the Louisiana Environmental Action Network, and the Gulf Restoration Network obtained an order from the United States District Court for the Eastern District of Louisiana enjoining the project until the Corps complies with the National Environmental Policy Act.

== Bridges over the canal ==
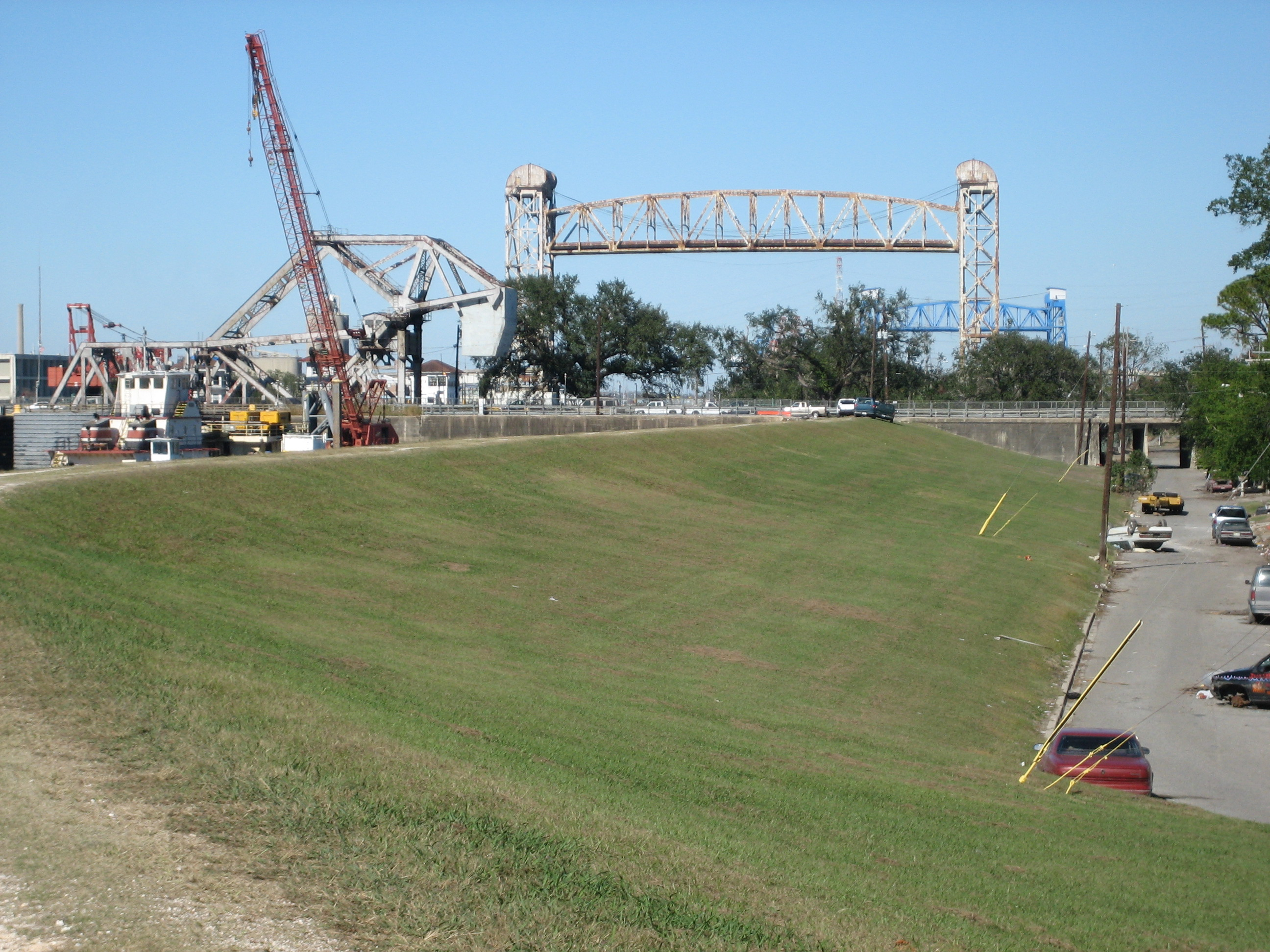
View from near the Mississippi River end of canal, with structures of St. Claude, Claiborne, and Florida Avenue bridges visible.

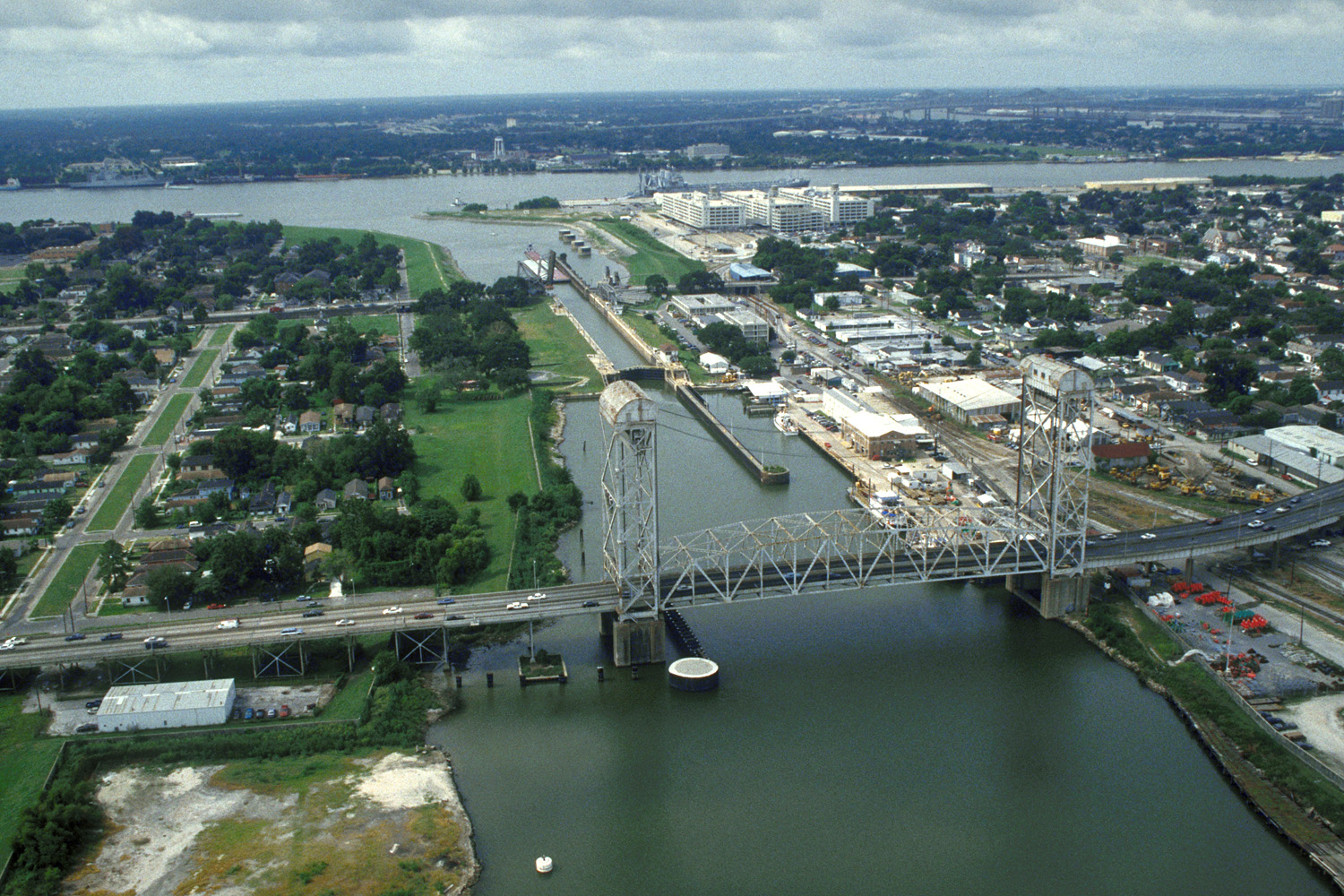
Aerial view of the Industrial Canal and Claiborne Avenue Bridge. View is to the south-southwest over New Orleans. If realized, the replacement lock would occupy the portion of the canal in the foreground, north of the Claiborne Bridge.

There are eight bridges over the Industrial Canal. Each provides sufficient vertical clearance for ship traffic. The bridges, beginning at the north end of the canal, are:

Seabrook Bridge
It is a medium-rise twin bascule, four-lane roadway bridge. The roadway is Lakeshore Drive, connecting to Leon C. Simon Drive on the upper side of the bridge, Hayne Boulevard on the lower side. The bridge is officially named Senator Ted Hickey Bridge. It is operated by the Orleans Levee District. Normally it stays in the down position for vehicular traffic, but it provides sufficient clearance for most marine traffic.
Seabrook Railroad Bridge
It is a bascule railroad bridge carrying two railroad tracks. It is owned and operated by Port of New Orleans. It normally stays in the up position. Amtrak's Crescent uses this bridge. Automobile traffic used this bridge prior to the construction of the bridge above. The former automobile lanes, with their deteriorated wooden decks, still straddle the railroad span.
Danziger Bridge
It is a lift bridge with seven vehicular lanes (US Highway 90 / Chef Menteur Highway). When this bridge was completed in 1988, replacing a previous bridge of the same name, it was the widest lift bridge in the world. Most marine traffic is accommodated in the down position.
I-10 High Rise Bridge
It is a high-rise six-lane freeway, referred to locally as "the I-10 high-rise" or just "the high-rise."
Almonaster Avenue Bridge
It is a bascule bridge with two railroad tracks and one vehicular lane in each direction, straddling the railroad bridge. It is owned and operated by the Port of New Orleans. Since Hurricane Katrina destroyed the roadways leading up to it, the bridge has been closed to vehicular traffic. The bridge continues to operate for railroad and marine traffic.
Florida Avenue Bridge
It is a lift bridge with one railroad track and two vehicular lanes. It is owned and operated by the Port of New Orleans. A parallel four-lane high-rise vehicular bridge is planned.
Claiborne Avenue Bridge
It is a lift bridge, officially named Judge William Seeber Bridge, with four vehicular lanes (North Claiborne Avenue). It accommodates most marine traffic in the down position.
St. Claude Avenue Bridge
It is a bascule bridge with four vehicular lanes. This was originally a combination railroad/automobile bridge, with the two pairs of railroad tracks in the center of the lift span and automobile lanes straddling it. However, the railroad is long gone, and one lane in each direction passes through the truss of the bridge and one lane passes alongside the truss. The bridge is integrated into the Industrial Lock structure, on the river side of the lock chamber. It raises when marine traffic enters or exits the lock.

== See also ==
- Effects of Hurricane Katrina in New Orleans
- Mississippi River Gulf Outlet
- Gulf Intracoastal Waterway
- U.S. Army Corps of Engineers civil works controversies (New Orleans)
