= Seabrook Railroad Bridge =

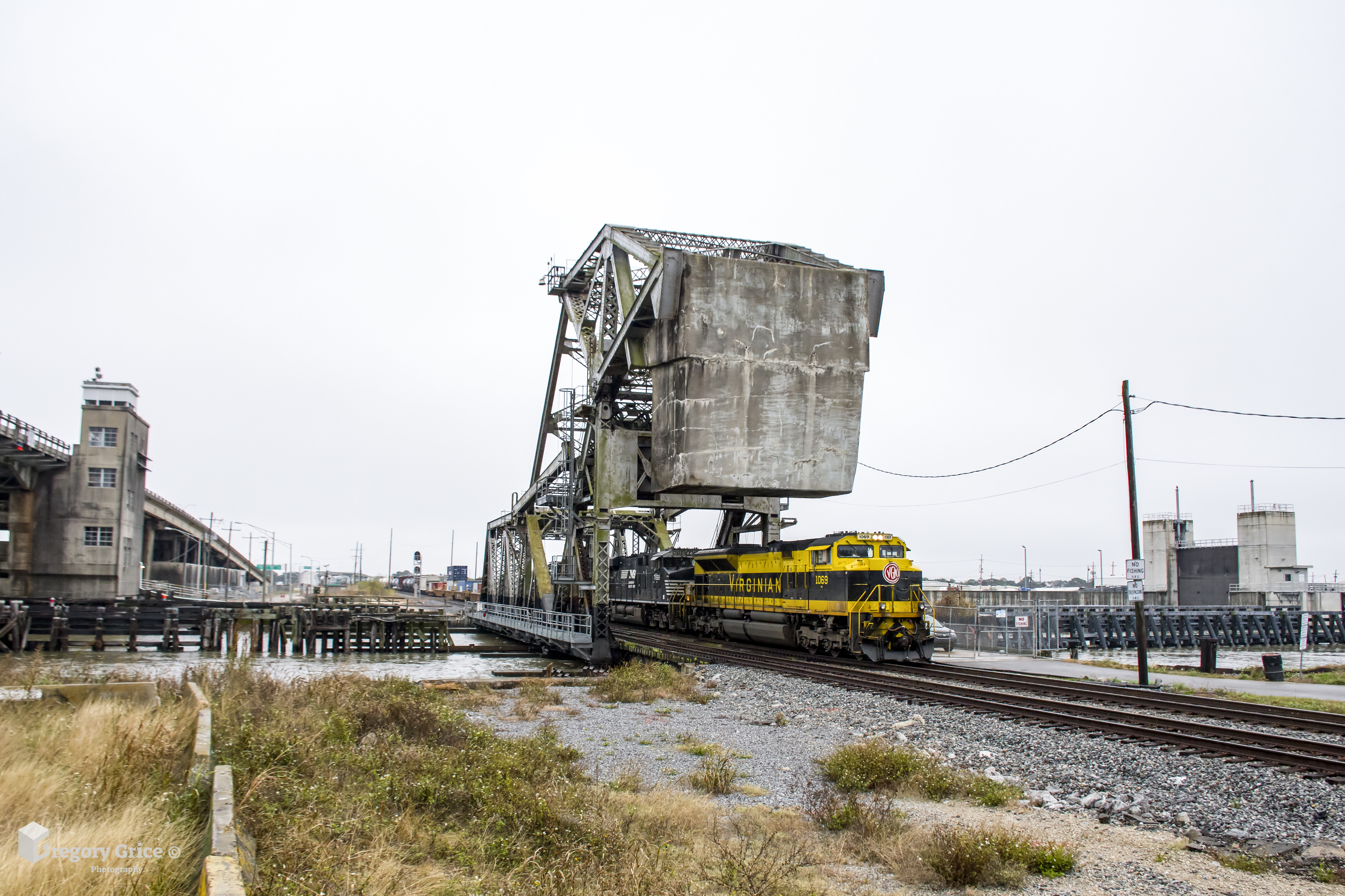
- NS Virginian Heritage at Seabrook Bridge
- Coordinates: 30°01′53″N 90°02′04″W
- Carries: railroad tracks
- Crosses: Industrial Canal
- Locale: New Orleans

The Seabrook Railroad Bridge is a bascule bridge in New Orleans, Louisiana running adjacent to the Seabrook Bridge. It is often confused with this vehicular bridge to the north, officially called the Senator Ted Hickey Bridge; therefore, it is commonly called the Seabrook Railroad Bridge, that now carries only trains across the canal. The bridge has a horizontal clearance of 79 feet (24 m) with unlimited vertical clearance when fully retracted.

== Location ==
The Norfolk Southern Railway's Seabrook Railroad Bridge is located north of New Orleans on Lake Pontchartrain, on the lake (north) side of the Seabrook Sector Gate Complex, and the terminus of a part of the Gulf Intracoastal Waterway called the Inner Harbor-Navigational Canal (IH-NC), locally referred to as the Industrial Canal, that connects Lake Pontchartrain to the Mississippi River.

== History ==
The Seabrook Railway Bridge is one of four bridges built by the Port of New Orleans in the 1920s in order to provide railroad access across the IH-NC. Besides Seabrook Railroad Bridge, two of the sister bridges, the St. Claude Avenue Bridge and Almonaster Avenue Bridge, remain in service today. The original Florida Avenue Bridge was removed in 2000 and replaced with the current modern, steel structure which was completed in May 2005.

The Seabrook Railroad Bridge was used for rail traffic and vehicular traffic until the opening of the higher, four lane Seabrook Bridge, circa 1967, when it was restricted to rail traffic only.

== Hurricane plans ==
In times of high winds above 40 mph, or the IH-NC reaches +5.0 feet NVGD, the bridges, shall be lowered or remained lowered, until such time as it is cleared to be reopened. In the event of a tropical storm or hurricane the St. Claude Avenue bridge, no longer used for rail, cannot be closed to vehicle or pedestrian traffic. The Florida Avenue Bridge shall be raised to 41 feet and all traffic closed.

Since rail traffic is limited, the rail bridges are normally in a raised position to facilitate waterway traffic. In the event the rail bridge is lowered water traffic must contact the authorities on radio frequency VHF 13 for information.
