= Industrial Canal Lock =

Industrial Lock
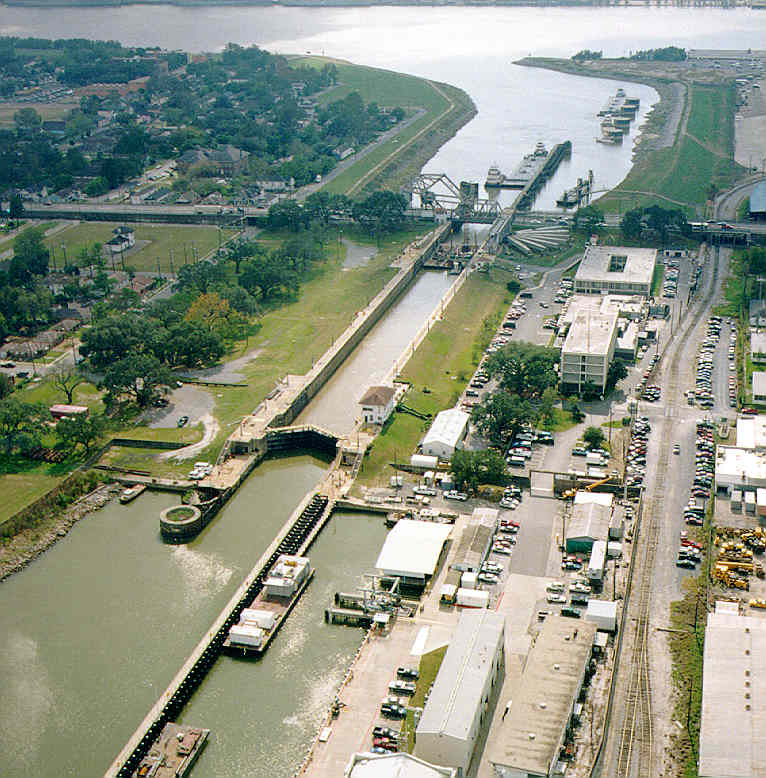
- Looking south toward the Lower Mississippi River
- Interactive map of Industrial Lock
- 29.965°N 90.02735°W
- Waterway: Industrial Canal
- Country: United States
- State: Louisiana
- First built: 1923
- Length: 195 metres (640 ft)
- Width: 22.9 metres (75 ft)
- Fall: 6 metres (20 ft)
- Distance to Lake Pontchartrain: 4.75 miles (7.64 km)
- Distance to Lower Mississippi River: 0.5 miles (0.80 km)

The Inner Harbor Navigation Canal Lock—commonly known as Industrial Canal Lock or simply Industrial Lock—is a navigation lock in New Orleans. It connects the Lower Mississippi River to the Industrial Canal and other sea-level waterways. Because it is shorter and narrower than most modern locks on the Mississippi River System, the 1920s vintage lock has become a bottleneck between the nation's two highest-tonnage waterways—the Mississippi and the Gulf Intracoastal Waterway.

The lock is located at Lower Mississippi River mile 92.6 AHP. Owing to the confluence of multiple waterways at the Industrial Canal and Lock, the lock chamber is also considered mile 6 EHL (east of Harvey Lock) on the Intracoastal and mile 63 on the Mississippi River-Gulf Outlet Canal.

Although the depth over the sill is 9.6 meters (31 feet), most of the traffic through the lock consists of shallower-draft barge tows transiting the Intracoastal.

== History ==
The Industrial Canal and Lock were built by the Port of New Orleans to provide navigation between the Mississippi River and Lake Pontchartrain. The project was completed in 1923.

In the 1930s, the federal Gulf Intracoastal Waterway connected to the Industrial Canal via Lake Pontchartrain and used the lock to connect to the Mississippi River. Commercial traffic using the lock paid a local toll of 5 cents per gross ton. Beginning in 1944, the federal government leased the lock and the southern segment of the canal, eliminating the toll.

In 1965 another waterway, the Mississippi River-Gulf Outlet Canal (MRGO), was completed and began using Industrial Lock. The MRGO was a deep-draft channel affording ocean-going vessels a short-cut from the Port of New Orleans to the Gulf of Mexico. Thus three different waterways—the Industrial Canal, the Intracoastal and the MRGO—were now using the same lock to connect to the river.

In 1986 the federal government purchased the Industrial Lock from the Port of New Orleans.

In 2008 the MRGO was closed due to its role in channeling Hurricane Katrina's storm surge into the heart of Greater New Orleans, thus reducing traffic through the lock but also, arguably, limiting the lock's utility.

== Recent repairs ==
The lock underwent major repairs in 1998. It was closed for two months, forcing marine traffic to take an oft-used detour through Breton Sound near the mouth of the Mississippi River.

The $6 million project included $2 million in emergency repairs. The chamber was dewatered for the first time in 20 years, and concrete was replaced in portions of the chamber itself and in four of the eight valves. The valve mechanisms had suffered rust and corrosion and were replaced with stainless steel hardware.

Six of the ten original gates, fabricated around 1920 and weighing 250 tons apiece, were removed for sandblasting and replacement of weak spots. New seals and pintles were installed.

According to the U.S. Army Corps of Engineers website the lock was closed on August 11, 2008, for 60 days for repairs.

== Replacement ==
Replacement of the canal lock with a larger lock was authorized as early as 1956, provided that traffic levels justified it. By the late 20th century, barge tows were waiting an average of ten hours to lock through. Despite community opposition in the adjacent Lower 9th Ward and Bywater neighborhoods, Congress approved a $573 million replacement project in 1998, and site acquisition and preparation began.

The new lock design features a larger chamber: 35.5 meters (116 feet) wide, 366 meters (1,201 feet) long and 9.6 meters (31 feet) deep. The lock is designed to be precast nearby and floated to site, immediately north of the existing lock. Ancillary and collateral work includes replacement of the adjacent St. Claude Avenue Bridge and nearby Florida Avenue Bridge.

Opponents of the replacement project argue that, in addition to causing environmental problems and economic disruption, lock construction is economically unjustified. Deep-draft ship traffic through the existing lock, for instance, declined by 29 percent between 1983 and 1991; and the primary barge commodity, coal, is projected to continue declining due to a number of economic and political factors. Proponents of the lock replacement project point to the same figures to support their contention that the existing obsolete lock is choking off commerce. Maritime interests also argue that in light of the closure of the MRGO, and the loss of the deepwater access it provided to the Gulf of Mexico, modern oceangoing vessels are unable to access the inner harbor of the Industrial Canal, permanently limiting the canal's utility as a site for shipyards and other industry requiring water access. A significant industrial exodus in the wake of the Katrina-induced closure of the MRGO has already transpired, with International Shipholding, Bollinger Shipyards and New Orleans Cold Storage departing. Without a new lock, the Port of New Orleans' France Road Container Terminal and Jourdan Road Wharf would also remain closed, as they too relied on the deepwater access provided by the MRGO.
