= IHNC Lake Borgne Surge Barrier =

Bridge in New Orleans, Louisiana, U.S.

Inner Harbor Navigation Canal Lake Borgne Surge Barrier
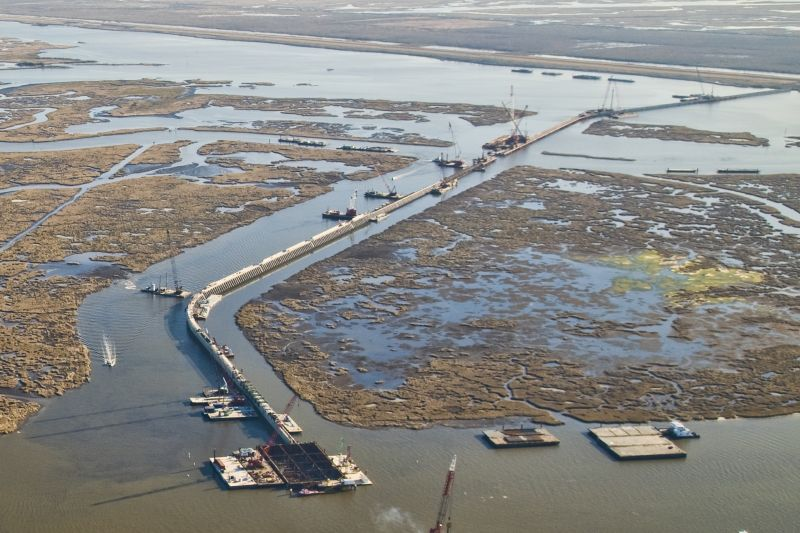
- The IHNC Surge Barrier, being built by the US Army Corps of Engineers. The GIWW in the foreground, the MRGO in the background
- Coordinates: 30°0′20″N 89°54′5″W
- Crosses: GIWW, MRGO
- Locale: New Orleans, Louisiana
- Owner: US Army Corps of Engineers

Characteristics
- Material: Concrete, steel
- Total length: 1.8 miles

History
- Construction start: 2008
- Construction end: 2013 (major construction)
- Construction cost: $1.1 billion

Location
- Interactive map of Inner Harbor Navigation Canal Lake Borgne Surge Barrier

The Inner Harbor Navigation Canal Lake Borgne Surge Barrier is a storm surge barrier constructed near the confluence of and across the Gulf Intracoastal Waterway (GIWW) and the Mississippi River Gulf Outlet (MRGO) near New Orleans. The barrier runs generally north–south from a point just east of Michoud Canal on the north bank of the GIWW and just south of the existing Bayou Bienvenue flood control structure.

Navigation gates where the barrier crosses the GIWW and Bayou Bienvenue can be worked to reduce the risk of storm surge coming from Lake Borgne and/or the Gulf of Mexico. Another navigation gate (Seabrook Floodgate) has been constructed in the Seabrook vicinity, where the IHNC meets Lake Pontchartrain, to block a storm surge from entering the IHNC from the Lake.

== Purpose ==
The Inner Harbor Navigation Canal (IHNC) surge barrier was authorized by Congress in 2006. The barrier is designed to reduce the risk of storm damage to some of the region's most vulnerable areas - New Orleans East, metro New Orleans, the 9th Ward, and St. Bernard Parish. This project aims to protect these areas from storm surge coming from the Gulf of Mexico and Lake Borgne.

== Status ==
The project was funded by the American Recovery and Reinvestment Act of 2009. In April 2008, the Corps awarded a construction contract to Shaw Environmental & Infrastructure for the Lake Borgne Surge Barrier, making this project the largest design-build civil works project in Corps history. It is highly unusual for a civil works project to be designed and constructed simultaneously. The expedited process was necessary, however, given the compressed time frame for achieving the 100-year level of risk reduction in 2011.

In October 2008, the New Orleans District Commander of the U.S. Army Corps of Engineers signed the Tier 2 portion of the Individual Environmental Report (IER), which investigated alternative alignments and designs within the location range identified by Tier 1 and explained the impacts of these alignments and footprints, construction materials and methods, and other design details. After the completion of the IER, a Notice to Proceed was issued to Shaw.

In December 2008, the Corps held a groundbreaking ceremony to mark the start of test pile driving. A joint venture of Traylor-Massman-Weeks was awarded the floodwall subcontract by Shaw Group|Shaw Environmental & Infrastructure and construction of the barrier's flood wall began on 9 May 2009. On 21 October 2009 the last of the 1,271 main piles was driven.

On 29 August 2012 (the seventh anniversary of Hurricane Katrina), the barrier was used for the first time, to protect the city from Hurricane Isaac. By June 2013, all major construction had been completed.

== Construction ==
The COE accomplished this project via the design-build delivery method. The main barrier consists of 1,271 concrete piles 66 inches (1.7 m) across and 144 feet (44 m) long, weighing 96 tonnes each. Behind those piles, steel piles are driven at an angle of 2 horizontal to 3 vertical. The steel piles are 288 feet long and are installed in two sections, with the lower 158-foot section driven and the upper 130-foot section fitted on top and welded in place. A precast concrete pile cap is placed on top of the steel batter piles and concrete plumb piles to join them.

Two gates were constructed in the Gulf Intracoastal Waterway navigation channel. One gate is closed with two sector gate leaves, the other gate with a barge swing gate, comparable to a caisson. In the Bayou Bienvenue navigation channel, a vertical lift gate was installed for use with recreational craft and shrimpers.

== Features ==
- Typical flood wall and the MRGO closure flood wall (over a mile long)
- 150-foot wide navigable floodgate on the GIWW—a steel sector gate (42 feet tall)
- 150-foot wide navigable bypass floodgate on the GIWW—a concrete barge swing gate
- 56-foot wide navigable floodgate on Bayou Bienvenue—a steel lift gate
- Concrete T-walls on land, at the north and south ends of the Lake Borgne barrier
- Approach walls at the GIWW sector gate and the Bayou Bienvenue gate
- Navigation gate in the Seabrook vicinity
- Marsh enhancement with dredged organic material - As organic material is dredged from waterways in preparation for new construction, it will be deposited in nearby wetlands habitats to enhance environmental conditions

== Engineering ==
COWI Marine North America, formerly Ben C. Gerwick, Inc., provided the detailed designs and drawings for

- The main barrier, including the flood wall and the MRGO closure
- The GIWW sector gate monolith walls and foundation
- The GIWW bypass concrete barge swing gate
- The GIWW bypass concrete barge swing gate mechanical operating systems
- Approach walls at the GIWW sector gate
- Scour stone protection for the barrier and gates

INCA (now TETRA TECH, INC.) provided the detailed designs and drawings for:

- GIWW Sector Gate
- GIWW Bypass Approach Walls
- Bayou Bienvenue Lift Gate Monolith
- Bayou Bienvenue Tower and Bridge
- Bayou Bienvenue Lift Gate (with Waldemar Nelson)
- Bayou Bienvenue Approach Walls
