= Seabrook Floodgate =

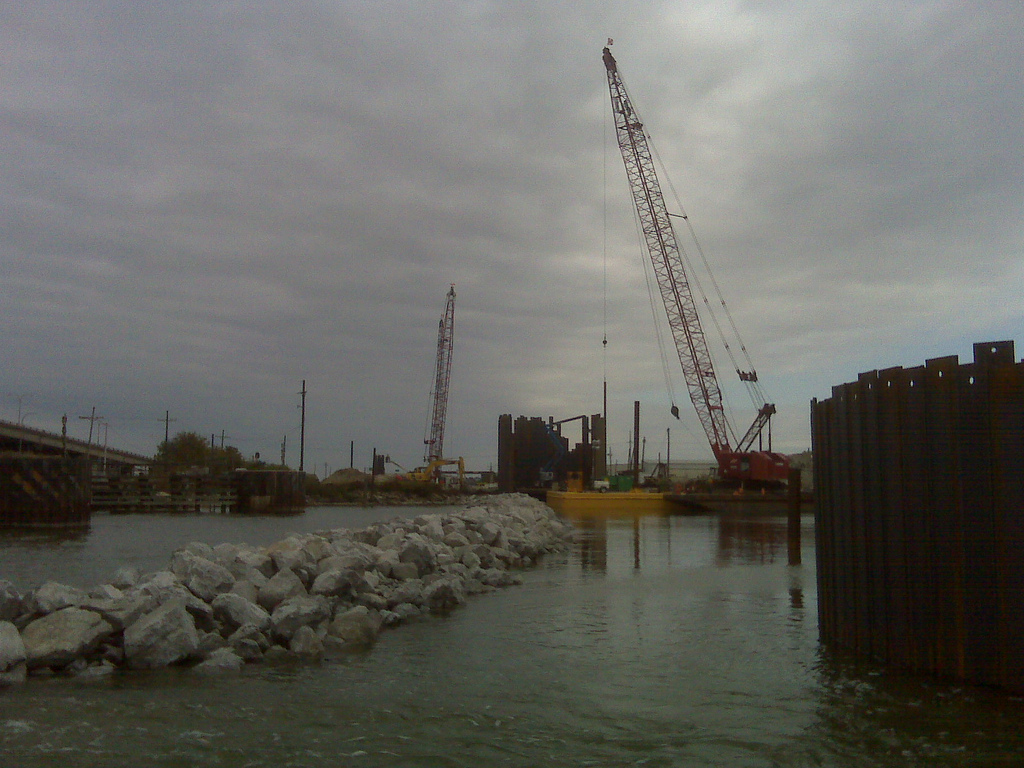
- Coordinates: 30°01′54″N 90°02′04″W
- Crosses: Industrial Canal
- Locale: New Orleans, Louisiana
- Owner: US Army Corps of Engineers

Characteristics
- Material: Concrete, steel

History
- Designer: Arcadis
- Constructed by: Alberici
- Construction start: 2010
- Construction end: June 2012

The Inner Harbor Navigation Canal (IHNC) Seabrook Floodgate Structure is a flood barrier in the Industrial Canal in New Orleans, Louisiana. The floodgate is designed to protect the Industrial Canal and the surrounding areas from a storm surge from Lake Pontchartrain. It consists of two 50-foot (15 m) wide vertical lift gates and a 95-foot (29 m) wide sector gate.

The building of the floodgate was authorized by Congress in 2006 and operated in tandem with the Lake Borgne Surge Reduction Barrier to reduce the risk of storm surge damage to some of the New Orleans region's most vulnerable areas – New Orleans East, metro New Orleans, the Ninth Ward, Gentilly, and St. Bernard Parish.

== Design ==
The Seabrook Floodgate Structure consists of a sector gate and two vertical lift gates approximately 340 feet (100 m) south of the Senator Ted Hickey Bridge with flood wall tie-ins on the east and west sides. Other components of the Seabrook Floodgate project include added T-walls and the replacement of the existing Alabama Great Southern Railroad gate with a new taller gate that met the 100 year level of risk reduction; new T-walls that tie into a new vehicle gate built at the boat launch on Leon C. Simon Drive; and raising the Hayne Boulevard ramps on both the east and west sides of the canal. The Seabrook structure closed the only remaining gap on the East Bank of the Hurricane and Storm Damage Risk Reduction System.

== Construction ==
The US Army Corps of Engineers awarded the construction of the project to Alberici Constructors, Inc. in July 2009 Construction started in the fall of 2010, and although construction activities continued beyond the Corps' projected June 1, 2011 deadline, a temporary cofferdam was built to reduce risk to the area during the construction.

The floodgate structure opened to marine traffic in August 2012. The same month it was closed for the first time, in order to protect the city from Hurricane Isaac.

Notable flooding was not seen in the protected area from Category 4 Hurricane Ida in 2021. Water levels on Lake Pontchartrain were slightly lower than Hurricane Katrina, but significant -- areas further west of the city, such as LaPlace, were inundated by high waters. Work to increase protection for the areas further west of New Orleans has come to fruition in the West Shore Lake Pontchartrain project, for which construction began in December 2022.
