= Claiborne Avenue Bridge =

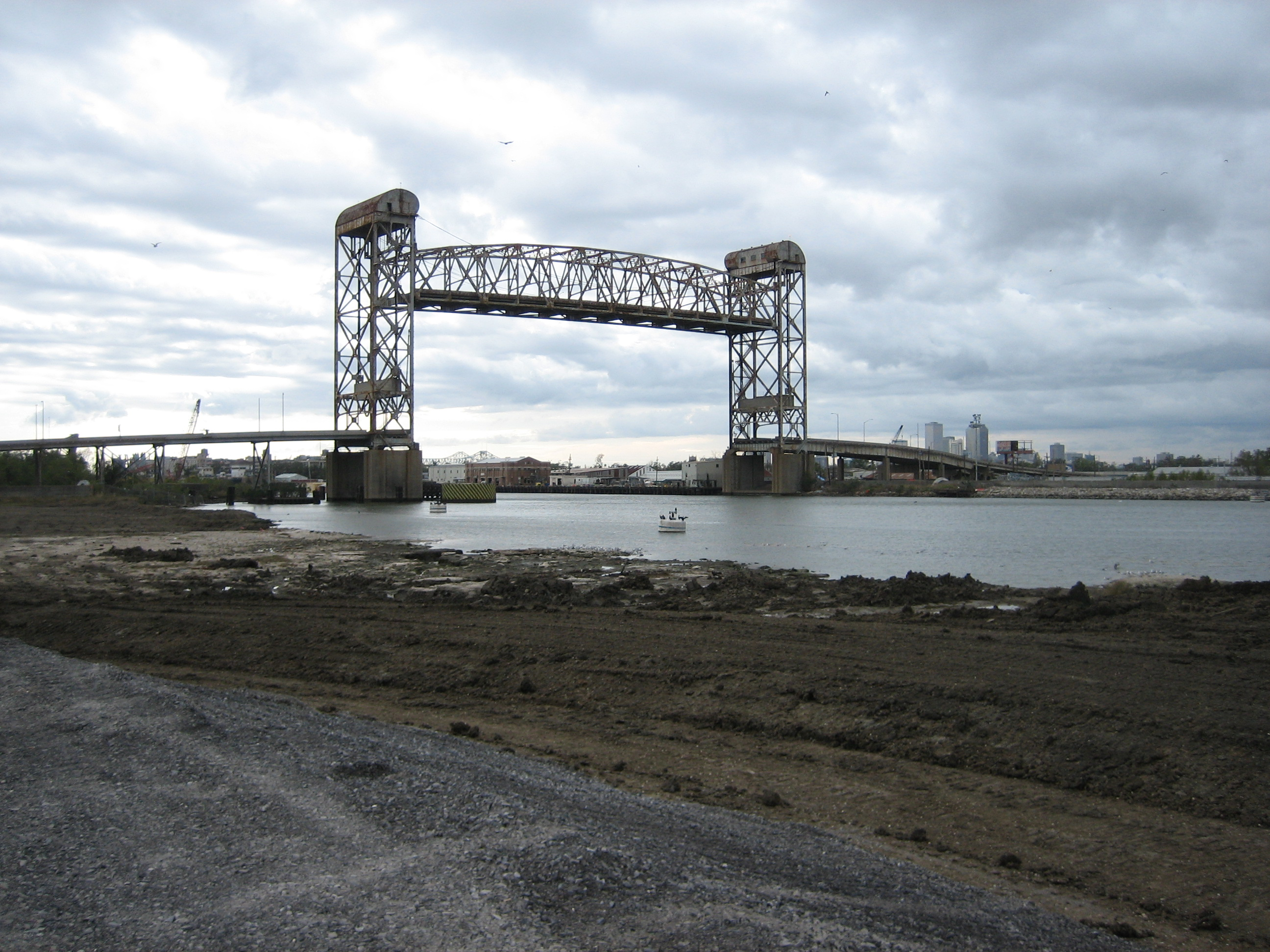
- Claiborne Avenue Bridge in raised position
- Coordinates: 29.969096°N 90.025734°W
- Carries: LA 39 (Claiborne Avenue)
- Crosses: Industrial Canal
- Locale: New Orleans, Louisiana
- Official name: Judge William Seeber Bridge

Characteristics
- Design: vertical-lift bridge
- Longest span: 360 feet (110 m)

History
- Opened: 1957

Location
- Interactive map of Claiborne Avenue Bridge

The Claiborne Avenue Bridge, officially known as the Judge William Seeber Bridge, is a vertical lift bridge in New Orleans, Louisiana over the Industrial Canal. It was built by the Louisiana Department of Highways (later renamed the Department of Transportation and Development) and opened to vehicular traffic in 1957. The bridge has suffered numerous incidents: A barge hit the bridge in 1993, Hurricane Katrina damaged it in 2005, and a car plunged into the canal in 2008 due to a malfunction.

== Description ==
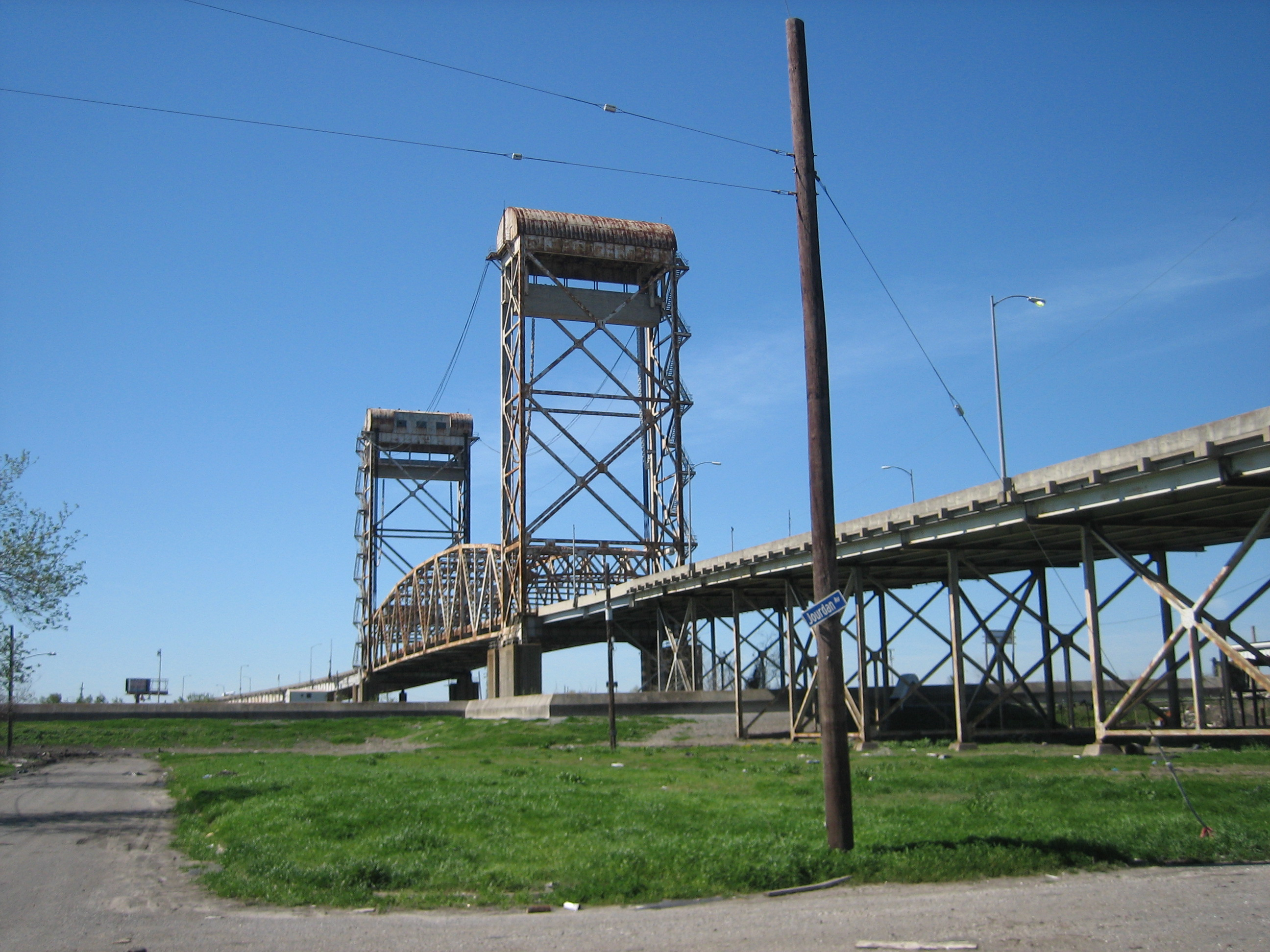
The Claiborne Avenue Bridge in lowered (vehicle traffic) position

The bridge carries four vehicular lanes, two in each direction, of North Claiborne Avenue, which here is also Louisiana Highway 39. It accommodates most marine traffic in the down position. The bridge is located in the 9th Ward of New Orleans, with the Upper 9th Ward on the western side and the Lower 9th Ward on the eastern or "lower" (down river) side. Along with St. Claude Avenue, it is one of the main links of New Orleans with the communities in St. Bernard Parish, Louisiana such as Arabi and Chalmette. Many locals who regularly use the bridge are unaware of the bridge's official name.

== Accidents ==
=== Tugboat collision ===
On May 28, 1993, the tugboat Chris was pushing an empty barge through the canal toward the Mississippi River locks. As was common at the time, the tugboat captain would have to wait to enter the locks, and he was directed to the side of the canal to ground his barge to keep the waterway clear. However, at 3:30 p.m., the barge collided with a support pier of the bridge, causing a 145-foot (44 m) section of the bridge to collapse onto the western canal bank and onto the barge. Two automobiles plummeted off of the bridge, killing one person and severely injuring two others. The waterway was closed to navigation for two days, and the bridge was closed for two months while the collapsed span was rebuilt. The concrete debris from the collapsed span was used to protect the new support pier from future collisions.

=== Hurricane Katrina ===
In 2005, Hurricane Katrina severely affected the areas on both sides of the bridge (see Effect of Hurricane Katrina on New Orleans), with the most extreme devastation on the Lower 9th Ward side. The bridge was out of service for months, left in the up position to accommodate Canal shipping, until it was restored to service in early 2006.

=== Crossing gates malfunction ===
On May 20, 2008, 17-year veteran New Orleans Police Officer Tommie Felix was killed when his vehicle drove off the bridge and plunged into the canal while the bridge was in the raised position. Eyewitness accounts said that the gates which come down to indicate the bridge's closure were not functioning at the time, and several other cars came close to driving off the bridge but stopped short.

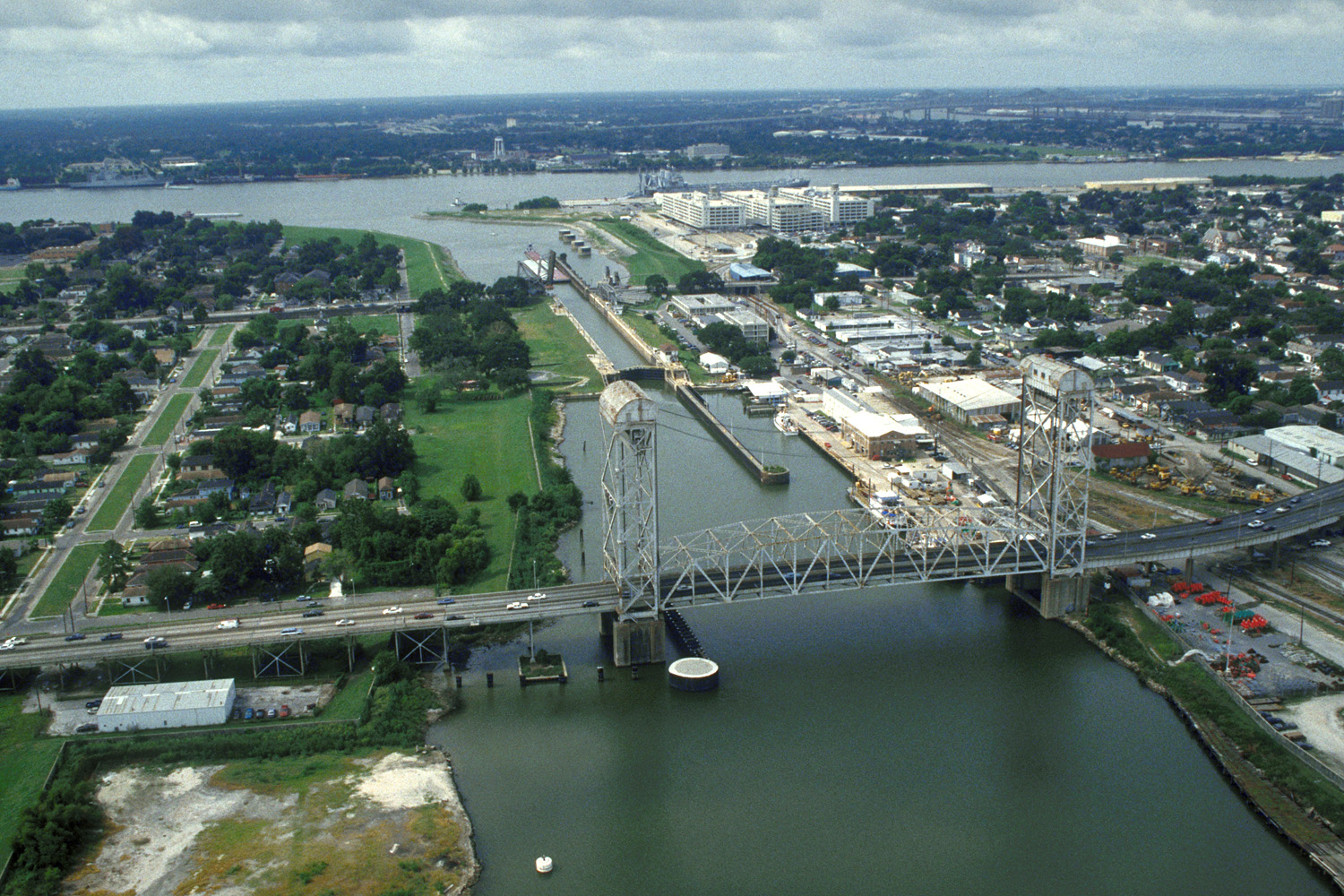
Aerial view of the Industrial Canal and Claiborne Avenue Bridge
