= Claiborne Avenue =

Main road in New Orleans, Louisiana, U.S.

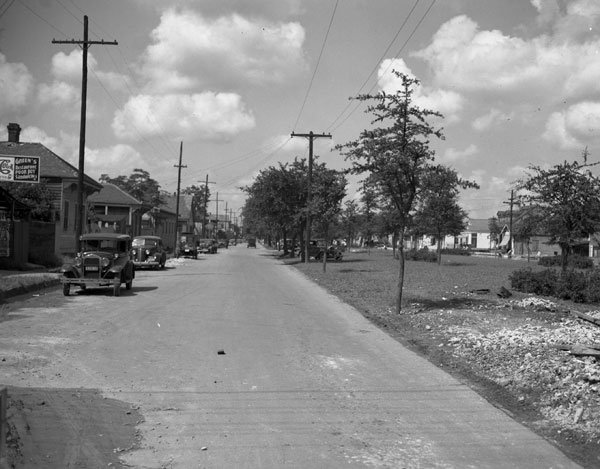
- Claiborne Avenue at Frenchmen Street, looking upriver in 1938
- Namesake: Gov. William C. C. Claiborne
- Length: 9.5 miles (15.3 km)
- Location: New Orleans, Louisiana, U.S.
- From: Jefferson Parish
- To: St. Bernard Parish

Claiborne Avenue is a major thoroughfare in New Orleans, Louisiana. It runs the length of the city, about 9.5 miles (15.3 km), beginning at the Jefferson Parish line and ending at the St. Bernard Parish line; the street continues under different names in both directions. It is called South Claiborne Avenue upriver from Canal Street and North Claiborne Avenue from Canal to St. Bernard Parish.

New Orleans' longest street was named in honor of William C. C. Claiborne, the first United States governor of Louisiana, serving during both the territorial period and as the first governor under statehood. New Orleans was the capital city in those days of the early 19th century.

== Route description ==
Claiborne Avenue can be divided into three general sections as it winds through the city, following the curves of the Mississippi River.

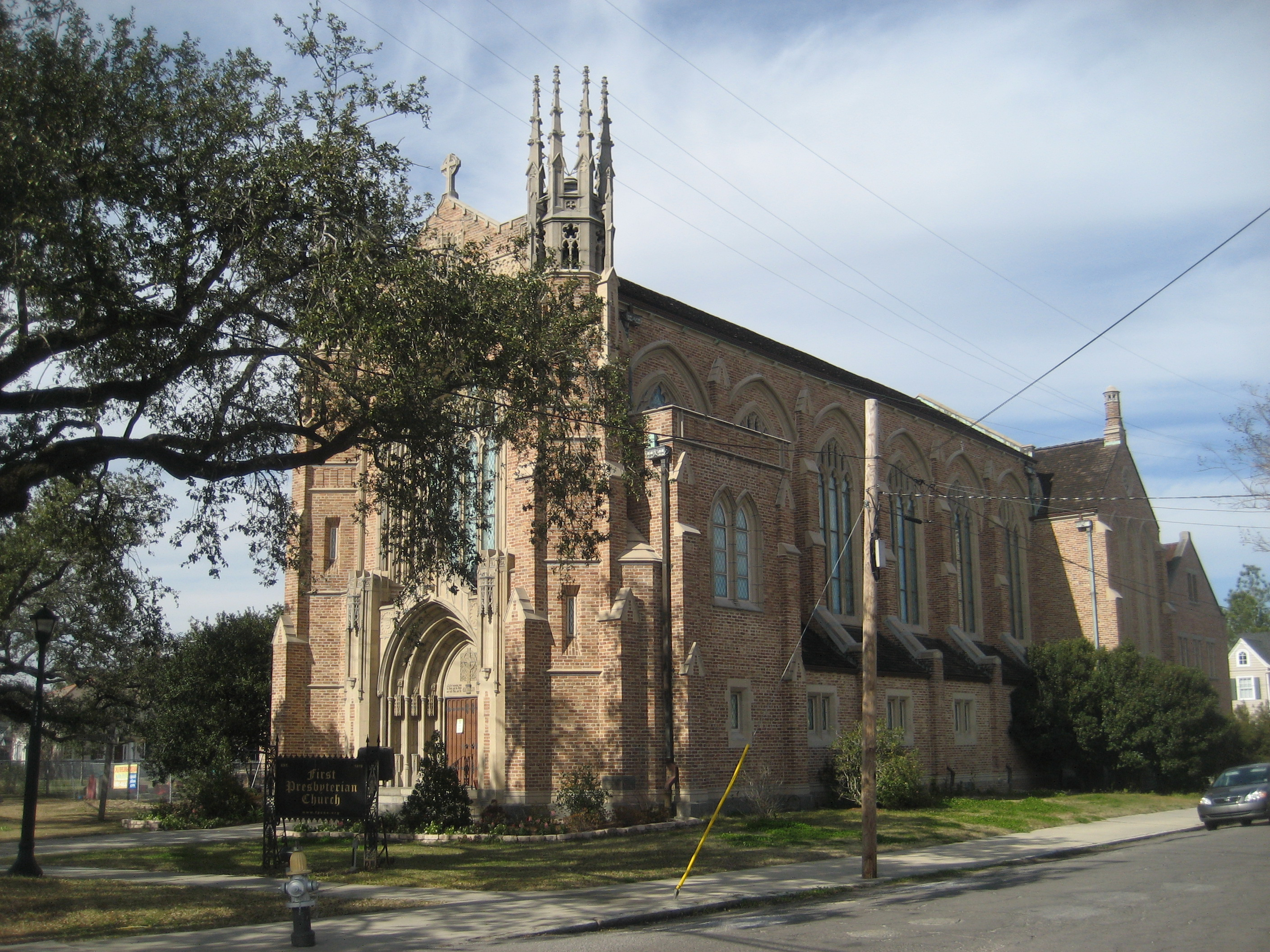
First Presbyterian Church, Claiborne Avenue at Jefferson

=== The Crescent ===
For the first few miles in the city coming from Jefferson Parish, Claiborne Avenue is part of U.S. Highway 90; before crossing the parish line it is called Jefferson Highway. Highway 90 shifts to Broad Street as it meanders its way out of New Orleans toward Slidell, while Claiborne continues towards the Central Business District. The section from Jefferson Parish to the large interchange at Earhart Boulevard and Interstate 10 visibly follows the crescent in the river, from about a mile inland, that gives New Orleans its nickname. For this stretch, the street is six lanes, three in each direction, with a neutral ground in the middle. It passes through a mix of residential and commercial districts.

=== Through the Treme ===
The oldest section of Claiborne Avenue runs through the Tremé neighborhood; in several phases there had been a street named for Governor Claiborne since the neighborhood was first developed in the early nineteenth century. The wide neutral ground was lined with southern live oak trees, and the public green space served as a center of congregation for the area's primarily African-American residents. The Claiborne intersection at Orleans Avenue, in the heart of Treme, remains a primary meeting ground for the Mardi Gras Indians.

This stretch of Claiborne is primarily commercial, with residential neighborhoods throughout the adjacent blocks. It traditionally served as an important African-American shopping district, a counterweight to Canal Street, which catered to the white community. For three blocks, Claiborne also passes the old Saint Louis Cemetery Number 2 in this section.

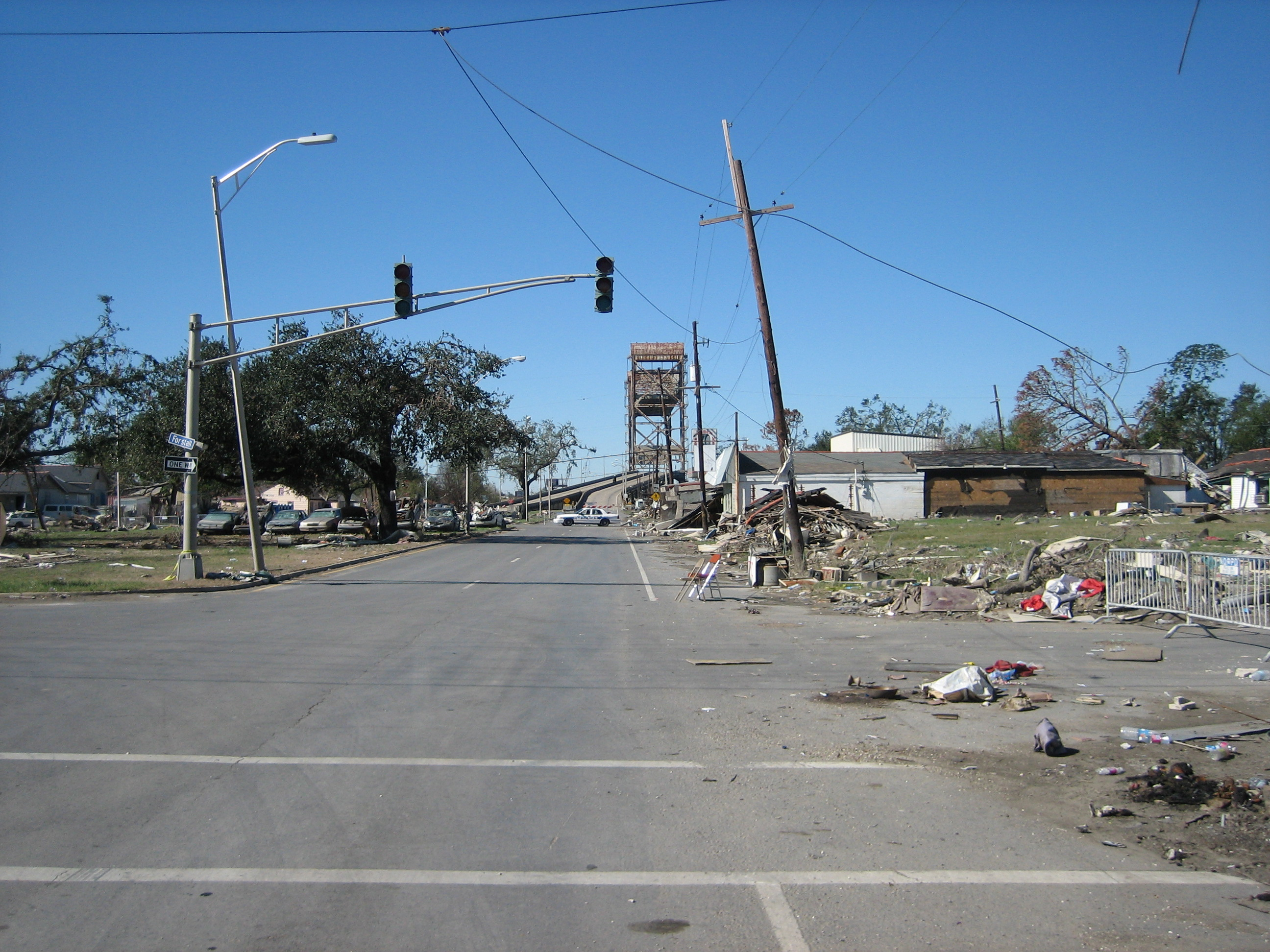
Claiborne Avenue, looking towards still closed bridge over the Industrial Canal after Hurricane Katrina

==== Overshadowed by I-10 ====
Claiborne Avenue was once a neutral ground and main street for Tremé, the oldest African-American neighborhood in the United States. In the 1950s, this avenue served as a community space lined with large oak trees and azalea gardens. During Carnival season, families would camp out, barbecue, and wait for the Mardi Gras parades to pass by. Due to racial segregation and Jim Crow laws in the South, African-Americans were not permitted to shop at white-owned stores. This resulted in the birth of the African American business district on Claiborne Avenue. This historic strip included a plethora of booming African American-owned businesses such as: theaters, drug stores, insurance companies, restaurants, and toy stores that occupied the space. At the intersection of St. Bernard Avenue and Claiborne was the St. Bernard Circle. The intersection bustled with activity around the famous Circle Food Store in New Orleans' historic Seventh Ward. This store was incorporated in 1938 and was New Orleans' first African American-owned full-service grocery store. The Circle Food Store provided groceries—"It stocked local staple foods and was even known to carry wild game"—a pharmacy, a doctor, a dentist, a chiropractor, check cashing and banking, and a place to buy school uniforms.

To much opposition from the neighborhood residents, a six-lane elevated Interstate-10 was constructed on Claiborne Avenue in 1969. The construction generally followed vacant land, such as the filled-in New Basin Canal. The original design called for the Interstate to be built along the river through the French Quarter. A successful campaign was organized by French Quarter residents and preservations to redirect that stretch of Interstate. The width of Claiborne Avenue provided the second most convenient route for construction, while still bringing the interstate very close to the Central Business District and the French Quarter, a few blocks from Claiborne. The opposition of the largely African-American and disenfranchised residents of Treme was not enough to stop the project from going forward. After construction, cement parking lots replaced the grassy neutral ground and supports for the interstate replaced the old oak trees, permanently changing the streetscape. It is commonly held that the construction of the overpass was intimately tied to the overall decline of the Treme neighborhood in the 60's and 70's. As part of the 2002 "Restore the Oaks" program, some of the round supports were painted by various local artists, while others were painted to resemble oak trees.

According to residents of the area, the Claiborne Expressway is generally acknowledged as the city's most hated piece of infrastructure and is considered the primary cause of the decline of the once thriving, African-American business district. The famous oak trees were removed from the avenue, nearly 500 homes in the area were destroyed, families were displaced, and the businesses closed. Over fifty years later, the only oak trees that line Claiborne Avenue are the ones painted on the concrete columns that support the interstate. Local artists have painted imagery on the columns that tell a story of the Tremé neighborhood's former history. In the wake of rebirth and reconstruction following Hurricane Katrina in 2005, many groups and leaders have made proposals to alter and/or remove the interstate in hopes of resurrecting the once booming strip. New programs attempt to restart economic growth, restore the area's history and culture, and create a future for young residents.

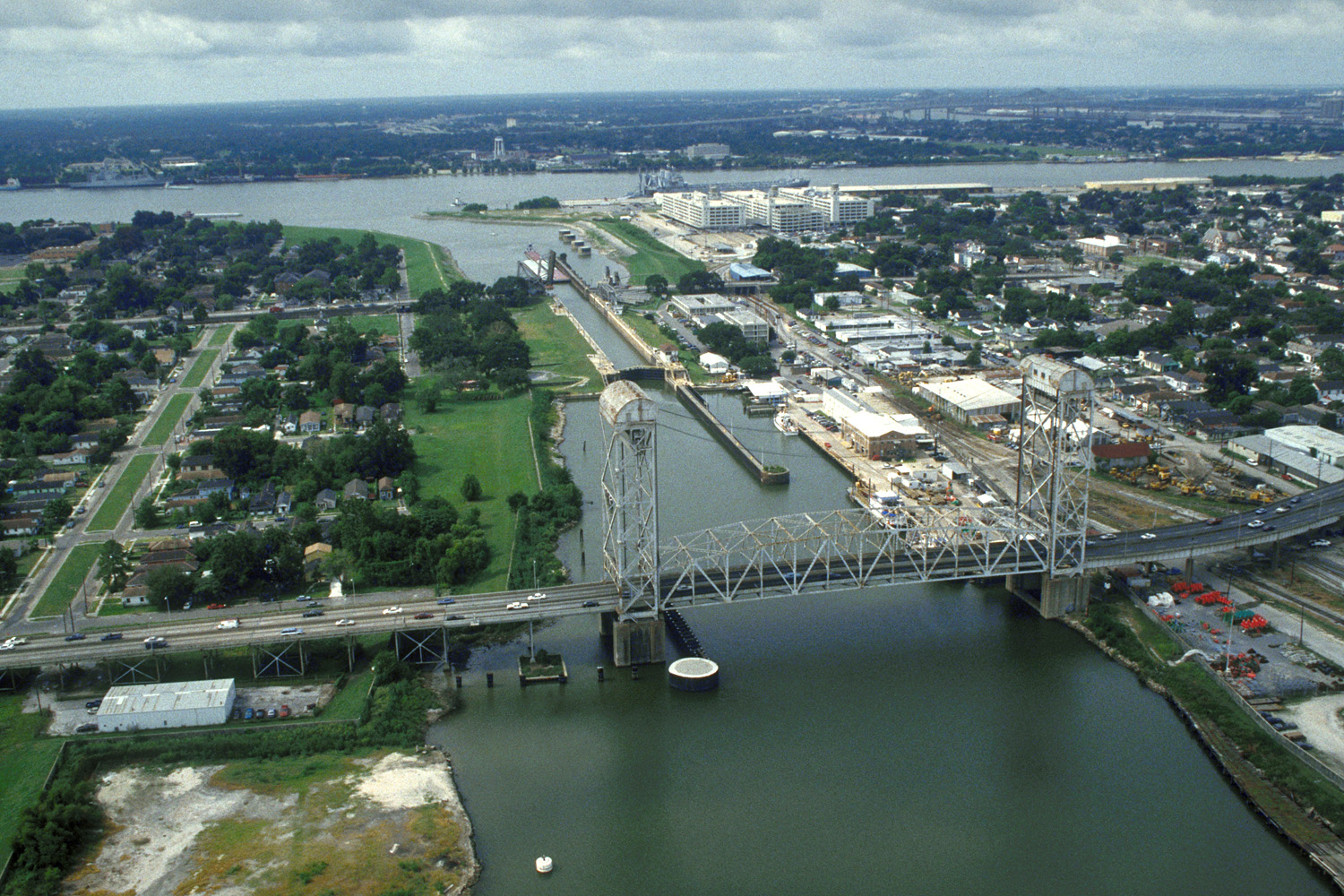
Claiborne Avenue Bridge over the Industrial Canal

In the wake of Hurricane Katrina, many have called for the removal of the I-10 Claiborne overpass, rerouting I-10 to the I-610 corridor. Supporters cite the structure's need for costly repairs and damage it has caused and continues to cause to what could potentially be a thriving urban neighborhood. Opponents argue that the overpass' removal would cause great inconvenience to the residents of New Orleans East and potentially require unwanted and intrusive expansion of the I-610 corridor. The September 14, 2009, draft of the New Orleans Master Plan called for the study and eventual removal of the overpass, though the Plan as adopted in 2010 did not contain such language.

=== Toward St. Bernard Parish ===
At St. Bernard Avenue (not to be confused with the parish), Claiborne and the Interstate part as the street continues to follow the river. It becomes a four-lane divided street, and then the eastbound (downriver) lanes separate from Claiborne to join North Robertson, a one-way street, through the upper Ninth Ward. At this point Claiborne Avenue is technically only the westbound side, a block away. The two rejoin at the Claiborne Avenue Bridge over the Industrial Canal, and the street continues through the Lower Ninth Ward to St. Bernard Parish, where it becomes Judge Perez Drive.

== See also ==
- List of streets of New Orleans
