= Mississippi River–Gulf Outlet Canal =

Former canal in Louisiana, United States

Coordinates: 29.89126°N 89.75744°W

Route of Mississippi River–Gulf Outlet Canal

The Mississippi River–Gulf Outlet Canal (abbreviated as MR-GO or MRGO) is a 76 mi (122 km) channel constructed by the United States Army Corps of Engineers at the direction of Congress in the mid-20th century that provided a shorter route between the Gulf of Mexico and New Orleans' inner harbor Industrial Canal via the Intracoastal Waterway.

In 2005, the MRGO channeled Hurricane Katrina's storm surge into the heart of Greater New Orleans, contributing significantly to the subsequent multiple engineering failures experienced by the region's hurricane protection network. In the aftermath the channel was closed. A permanent storm surge barrier was constructed in the MRGO in 2009, and the channel has been closed to maritime shipping.

The MRGO begins just west of I-510's crossing of the Gulf Intracoastal Waterway in New Orleans East and takes a path SSE through St. Bernard Parish wetlands just west of Lake Borgne to the Gulf of Mexico near Gardner Island. Much criticized for its negative environmental effects, such as saltwater intrusion, wetlands erosion and storm surge amplification during Hurricane Katrina, the MRGO was closed in 2009. Maritime traffic was barred on April 22, 2009.

== History ==
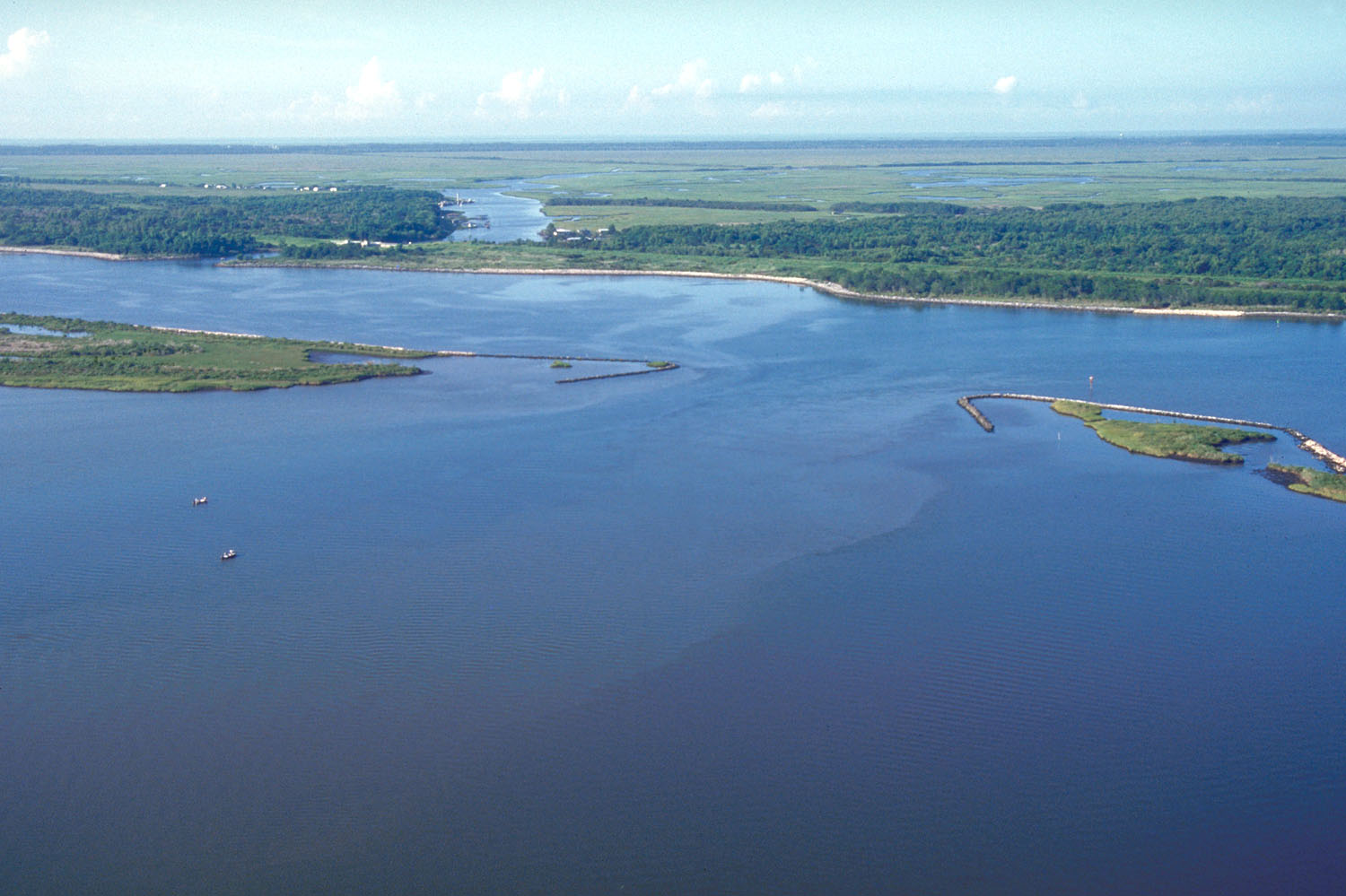
The MRGO and an outlet into Lake Borgne, approximately 50 miles (80 km) up the canal from its mouth and 15 miles (24 km) east of New Orleans (view towards the southwest)

Conceptually, the MRGO was first envisioned early in the 20th century as a way to provide shipping with a shorter route to the Gulf of Mexico. The Port of New Orleans felt increasingly disadvantaged by the length of time oceangoing vessels needed to navigate the twists and turns of the Mississippi River from the Gulf to the port's wharfs, versus the much closer proximity to open water offered by its emerging competitors. The modern Port of Houston, in particular, came into being as a consequence of the completion of the Houston Ship Channel in 1914. New Orleans' initial response debuted in 1923, with the inauguration of the Industrial Canal linking the Mississippi River and Lake Pontchartrain, thereby creating the Lower 9th Ward and New Orleans East.

In 1943, the proposed project was initially presented to the U.S. Army Corps of Engineers by the Dock Board of New Orleans under the name "Alexander Seaway", in reference to Col. Lester F. Alexander, a member of the Dock Board who was one of the architects behind the New Orleans plan. A competing plan was also presented by Jefferson Parish, referred to as the "Arrow to the Americas,' also known as the Jefferson Seaway.

In a matter of decades, the rapid growth of average ship size in the 20th century rendered the canal locks connecting the Industrial Canal to the Mississippi River obsolete; the MRGO as promoted in the 1950s was to help rectify this deficiency by permitting deep-draft vessels to access the Industrial Canal inner harbor. Authorization for the MRGO was formally provided by the United States Congress in the Rivers and Harbors Act of 1956. Construction was completed in 1968.

Due to rapid erosion of the surrounding marsh, the canal was already as much as four times wider by 2005 than as originally constructed. When MRGO was built, the channel was 650 feet (200 m) wide at the surface. By 2005 the channel had opened to up to 3,000 feet in some locations and had been dredged annually.

== Operational performance ==
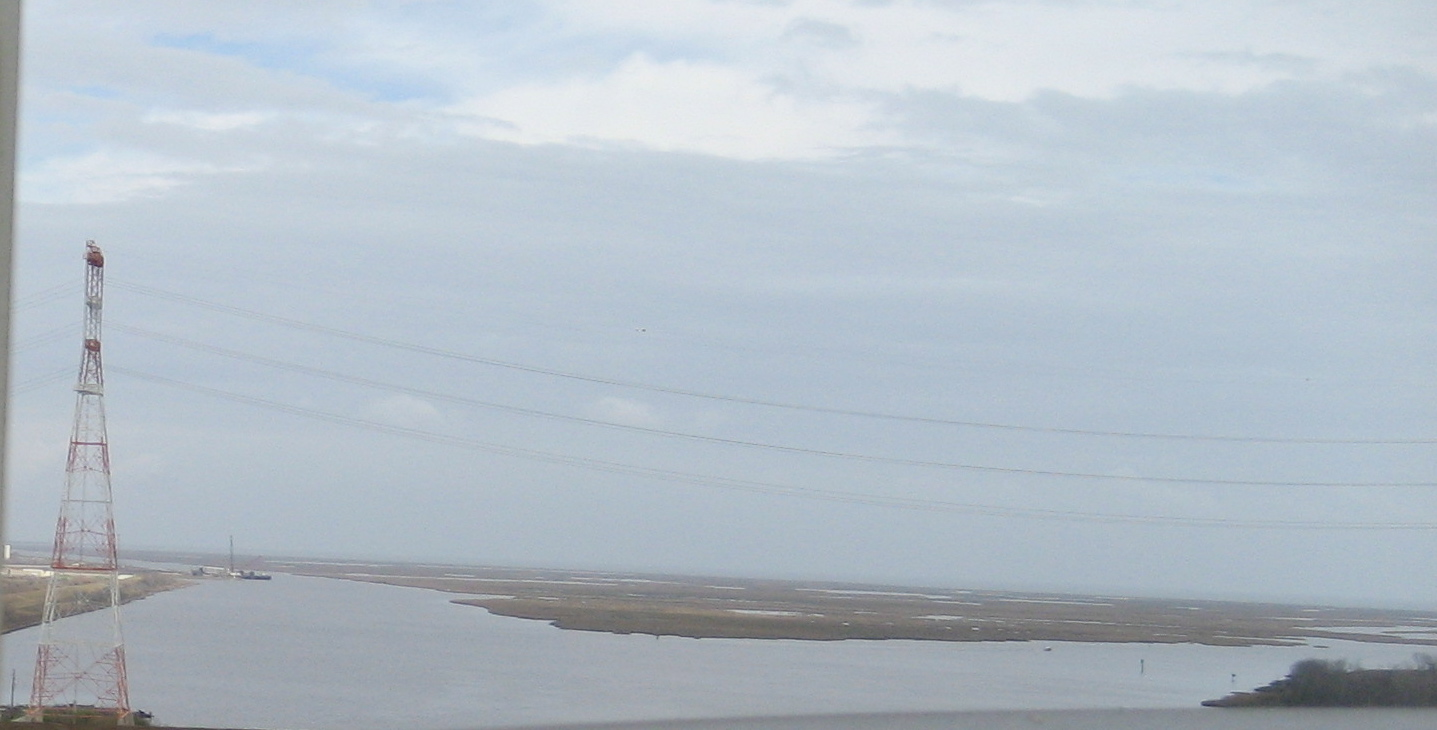
Intersection of MRGO (to right) with the Gulf Intracoastal Waterway, as seen from I-510 Bridge

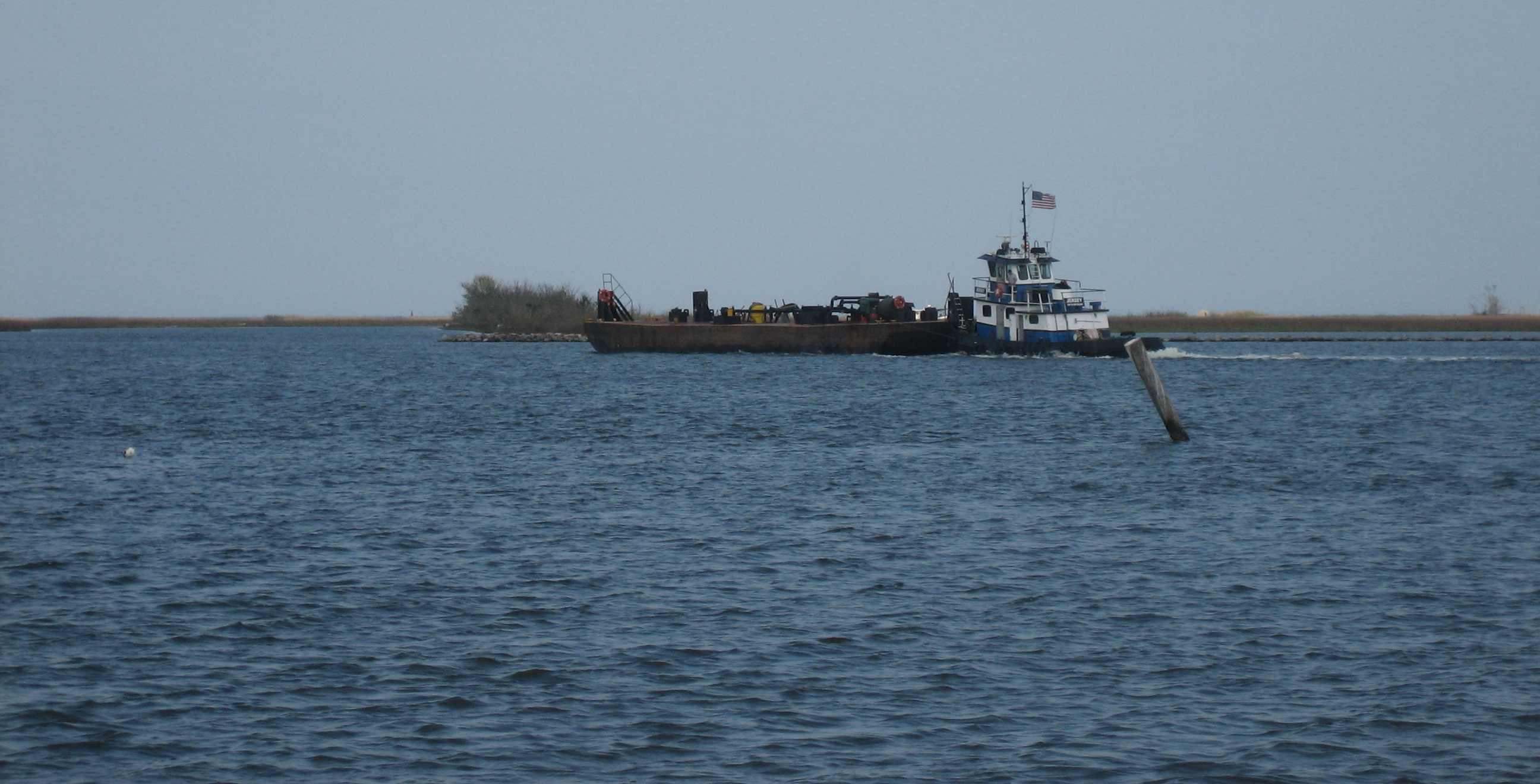
Tugboat and barge in MRGO at Shell Beach, St. Bernard Parish

With the completion of MRGO in 1965, the Port of New Orleans advanced a plan to largely abandon its wharfs along the Mississippi River and relocate its activities to the inner harbor created by the Industrial Canal, the Intracoastal Waterway, and the MRGO. This vast project, termed Centroport U.S.A., never secured sufficient funding and was quietly jettisoned by the port in the mid-1980s. The France Road Container Terminal and the Jourdan Road Wharf were the only two elements realized according to the Centroport plan.

After the abandonment of the Centroport project, the Port of New Orleans refocused its efforts on improving its infrastructure along the Mississippi River, and what little maritime traffic the MRGO hosted progressively dwindled, opening it up to withering critiques.

In 1997, the Competitive Enterprise Institute, a libertarian organization dedicated to "the principles of free enterprise and limited government" attacked it on economic grounds:

The promised economic development along the 76 mile channel in poverty-stricken St. Bernard Parish has yet to materialize. What the MRGO has delivered is an $8-plus million yearly maintenance plan for commercial and recreational waterborne traffic. The nearly $1 billion price tag for the less than two large container ships a day that use the channel is baffling, especially considering that the channel only shaved 37 miles off the original route.

Prior to Hurricane Katrina, environmentalists and others, including voters in St. Bernard Parish whom the canal was intended to help, called for its closure.

Criticism intensified following the hurricane, when engineers implicated the MRGO in the failure of levees and flood-walls protecting large parts of Greater New Orleans. MRGO was derisively termed a "Hurricane Highway" in Katrina's wake, due to its apparent role in amplifying the impacts of storm surges.

According to a congressional hearing statement made in late 2005 by Scott Faber of the Environmental Defense Fund, "Traffic on the MR-GO has fallen by more than 50 percent since 1986. As of 2005, less than one oceangoing vessel per day, on average, used the MRGO canal, which costs approximately $13 million annually to maintain. Like many waterways constructed by the Corps, the MR-GO failed to attract as much traffic as the Corps predicted when the project was constructed."

== Role in Hurricane Katrina disaster ==
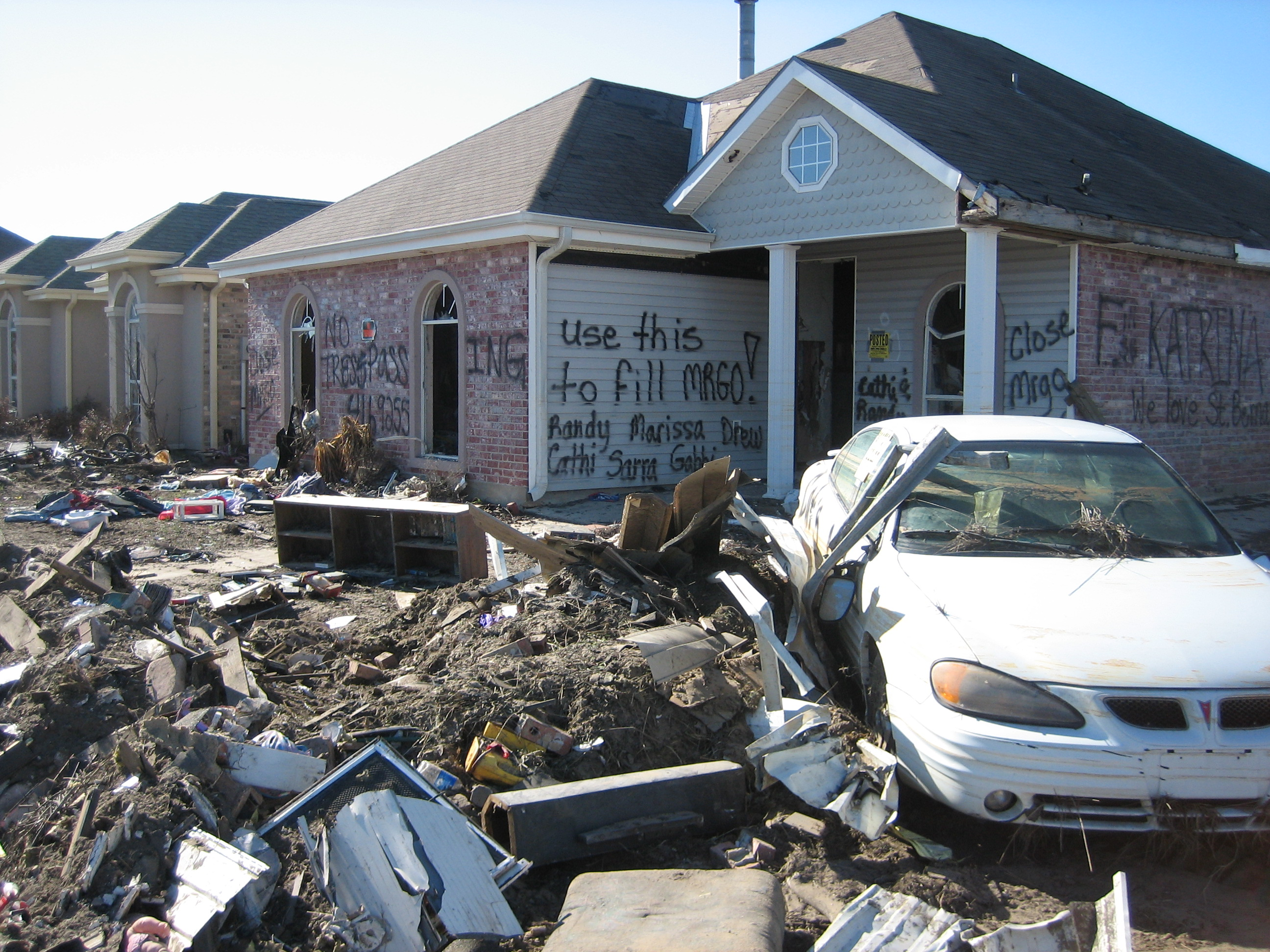
Inscription on house in storm-surge devastated neighborhood of Chalmette, Louisiana suggests that the ruins be used to fill MRGO.

Levees along the MRGO and the Intracoastal Waterway were breached in approximately 20 places, directly flooding most of St. Bernard Parish and New Orleans East. Storm surge from the MRGO is also a leading suspect in the three breaches of floodwalls along the Industrial Canal.

Three months before Katrina, Hassan Mashriqui, a storm surge expert at Louisiana State University's Hurricane Center, called MRGO a "critical and fundamental flaw" in the Corps' hurricane defenses, a "Trojan Horse" that could amplify storm surges 20 to 40 percent. Following the storm, an engineering investigation and computer modeling showed that the outlet intensified the initial surge by 20 percent, raised the height of the wall of water about three feet, and increased the velocity of the surge from 3 feet per second (0.9 m/s) to 8 feet per second (2.4 m/s) in the funnel-shaped region between the converging MRGO and Gulf Intracoastal Waterway. Mashriqui believes this funnel effect contributed to the scouring that undermined the levees and floodwalls along the Gulf Outlet, the Intracoastal Waterway, and the Industrial Canal. "Without MRGO, the flooding would have been much less," he said. "The levees might have [been] overtopped, but they wouldn't have been washed away." The Army Corps of Engineers disputes this causality and maintains Katrina would have overwhelmed the levees with or without the contributing effect of MRGO since the storm surge was perpendicular to the length of the canal.

Katrina's passage caused extensive shoaling of the MRGO, resulting in its impassability for deep-draft oceangoing vessels. Officials of St. Bernard Parish immediately opposed its reopening. Maritime interests called for re-opening the Gulf Outlet but equipping it with protective floodgates, or accelerating construction of the Inner Harbor Navigational Canal lock project, which when completed would allow MRGO to be closed without affecting deep-draft commercial traffic.

== Closure ==
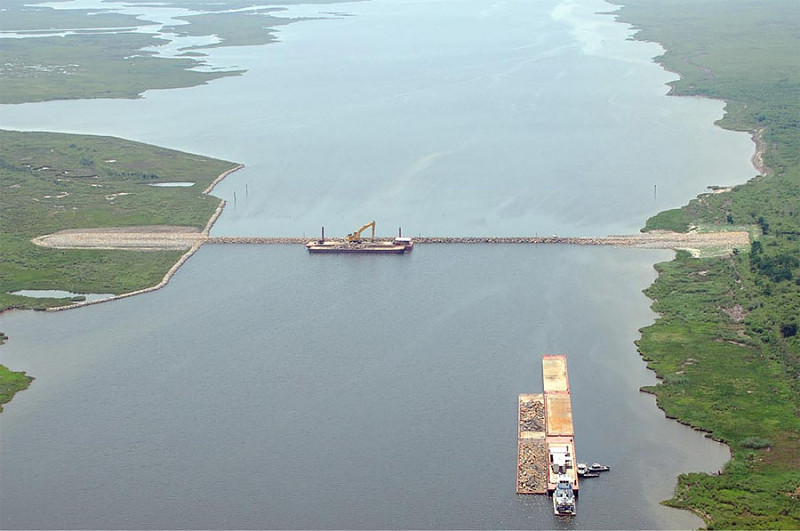
Closure structure across MRGO at Bayou La Loutre shortly before completion, July 2009

In May 2007 the Corps of Engineers announced it would close the MRGO to all traffic and would build an earthen dam across the MRGO in alignment with the natural ridge paralleling Bayou La Loutre. The Bayou La Loutre ridge siting was selected to complement future wetland restoration efforts, as the natural ridge could regain its historic function of sheltering the marsh and swamp behind from the Gulf of Mexico.

Construction began in late 2008, and the Corps of Engineers completed the closure structure across the MRGO at Bayou La Loutre in July 2009.

Supplementing construction of the closure, the Army Corps of Engineers also produced the MRGO Ecosystem Restoration Plan. The plan outline key components of revitalizing the wetlands and water bodies that had been damaged by the construction and resulting factors (e.g. salt water intrusion) of the MRGO. The roughly $2.9 billion plan included:

- A freshwater diversion at or near Violet, Louisiana
- 14,123 acres of fresh and intermediate marsh
- 32,511 acres of brackish marsh
- 10,318 acres of cypress swamp (main species swamp cypress and water tupelo)
- 466 acres of saline marsh
- 54 acres of Bayou La Loutre ridge habitat
- 71 miles of shoreline protection in Lake Borgne, along the MRGO, and in the Biloxi Marsh, including 5.8 miles of oyster reef restoration in the Biloxi Marsh
- 2 recreation features

The MRGO Ecosystem Restoration Plan was never implemented due to a disagreement about funding. The U.S. Army Corps of Engineers' District Engineer stated "I further recommend Federal and Non-Federal Sponsor responsibilities and cost sharing requirements...," while the State of Louisiana viewed the "project should be undertaken at full Federal expense and that the state should have no financial obligations with respect to the Mississippi River Gulf Outlet Ecosystem Restoration Project."

== Surge Barrier ==
Closer to New Orleans, a robust 1.8 mile surge barrier costing more than $1 billion was constructed. The surge barrier closed the narrow end of the "funnel" described by the convergence of the levees bounding the northern edge of the Intracoastal Waterway and the southern edge of the MRGO, preventing future storm surges from penetrating into the inner harbor of the Industrial Canal and Intracoastal Waterway. Two gates were built, one at Bayou Bienvenue and another across the Intracoastal Waterway, to permit the passage of barge and other small commercial traffic during normal weather conditions. The barrier, the largest of its kind in the United States, should protect against storm surges up to 28 feet in height. It was finished in 2011, and is far more significant than the Bayou La Loutre closure structure. It is two feet lower than the levees it will connect to in New Orleans East and St. Bernard Parish. This will allow water to spill over the control structure before it overtops these levees.

== See also ==
- U.S. Army Corps of Engineers civil works controversies (New Orleans)#Lawsuits issues in New Orleans
- List of canals in the United States
