= Flood barrier =

Floodgate designed to prevent a storm surge

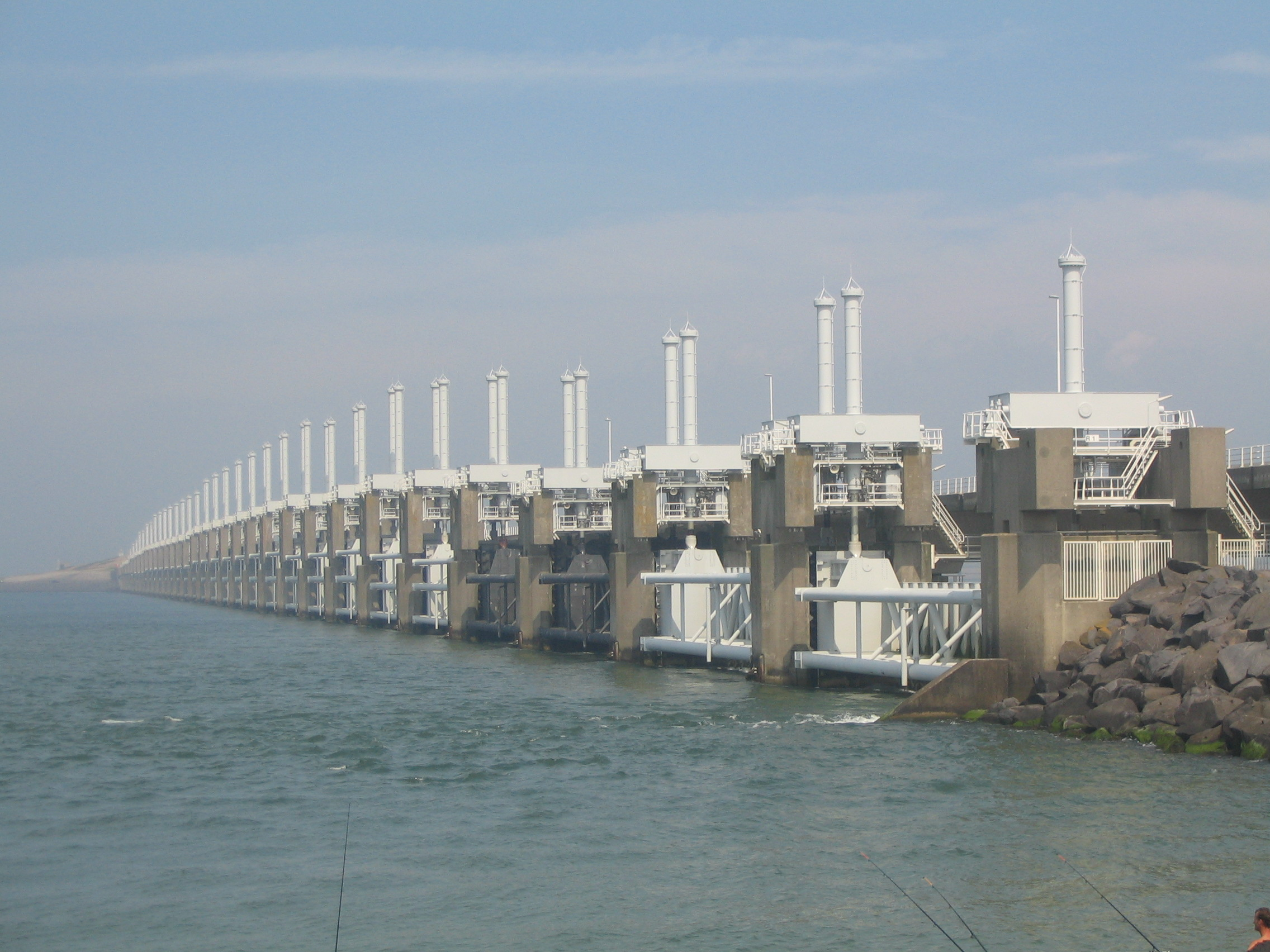
The Oosterscheldekering contains 62 steel doors, each 42 metres (138 ft) wide

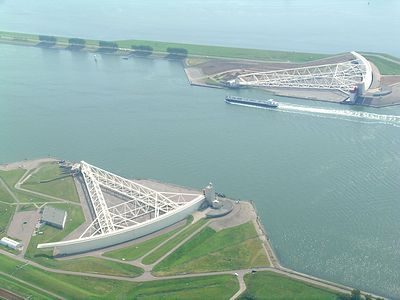
The Maeslantkering closes the main entrance to the Port of Rotterdam, the largest port in Europe.

A flood barrier, surge barrier or storm surge barrier is a specific type of floodgate, designed to prevent a storm surge or spring tide from flooding the protected area behind the barrier. A surge barrier is almost always part of a larger flood protection system consisting of floodwalls, levees (also known as dikes), and other constructions and natural geographical features. Flood barrier may also refer to barriers placed around or at individual buildings to keep floodwaters from entering the buildings.

== Examples ==
=== Delta Works ===
The Delta Works in the Netherlands is the largest flood protection project in the world. This project consists of a number of surge barriers, the Oosterscheldekering being the largest surge barrier in the world, 9 kilometres (5.6 mi) long. Other examples include the Maeslantkering, Haringvlietdam and the Hartelkering.

=== Thames Barrier ===
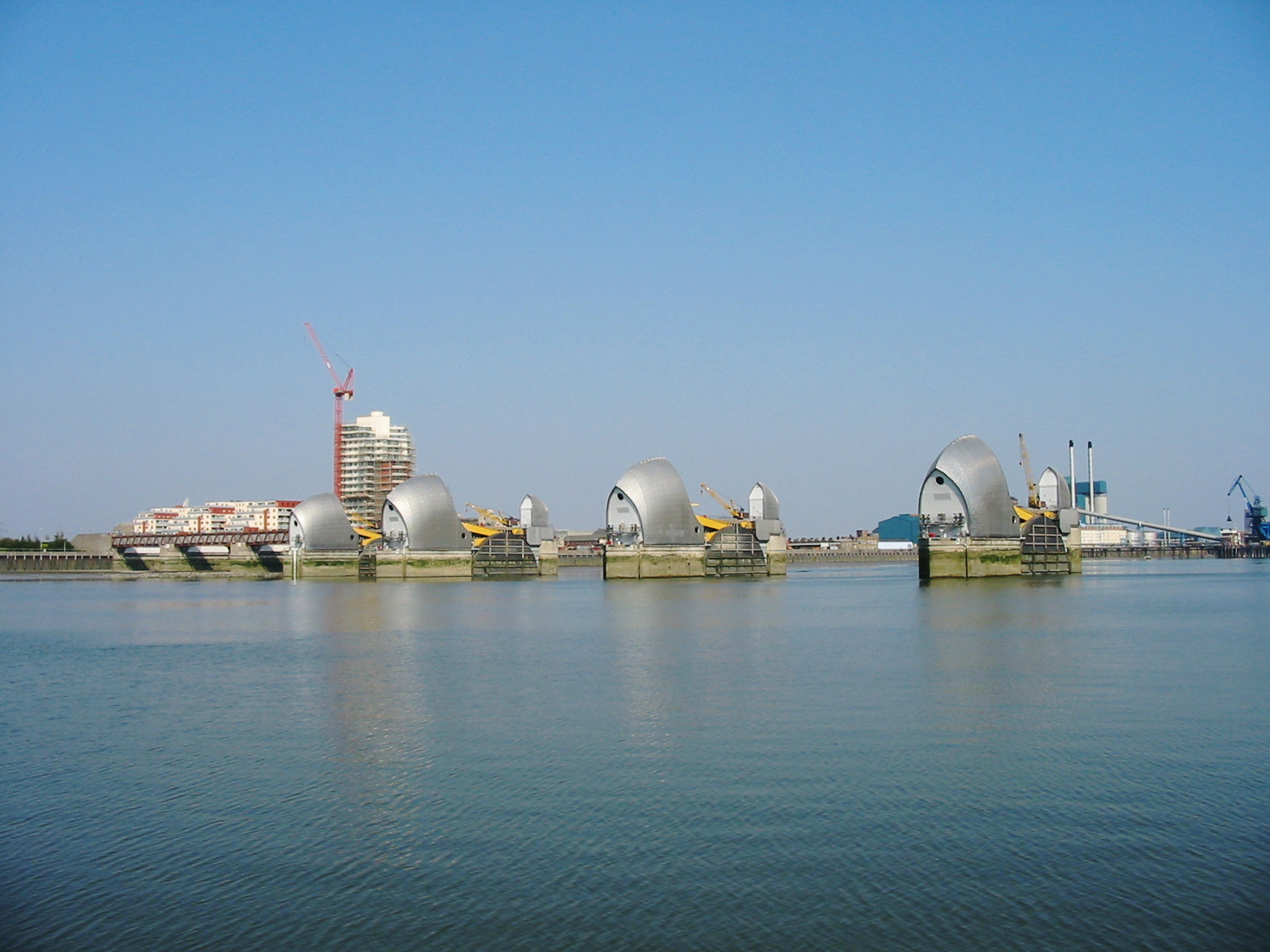
River Thames Flood Barrier

The Thames Barrier is the world's second largest movable flood barrier (after the Oosterscheldekering and the Haringvlietdam) and is located downstream of central London. Its purpose is to prevent London from being flooded by exceptionally high tides and storm surges moving up from the North Sea. It needs to be raised (closed) only during high tide; at ebb tide it can be lowered to release the water that backs up behind it.

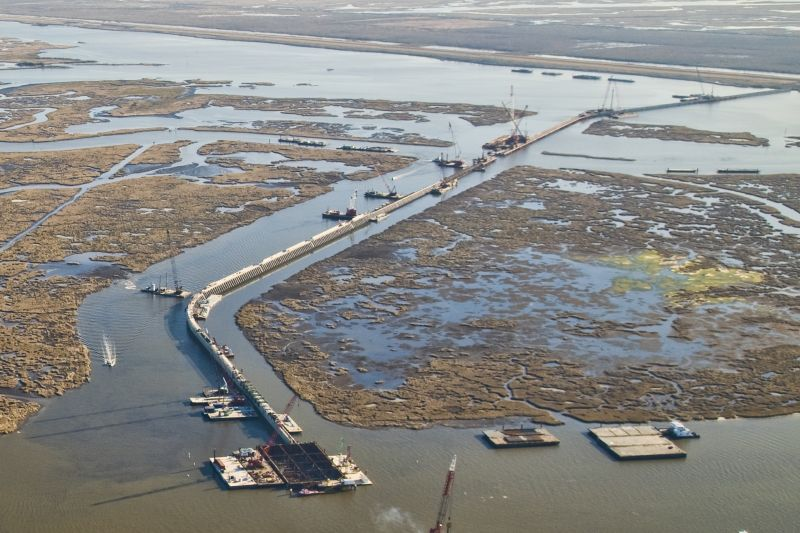
The IHNC Surge Barrier, being built by the US Army Corps of Engineers. The GIWW in the foreground, the MRGO in the background

=== New Orleans ===
In 2007 the United States Army Corps of Engineers started construction of an ambitious project that aimed to prevent storm surges from flooding the city by 2011. The IHNC Lake Borgne Surge Barrier on the confluence of these waterways is the largest in the United States. It protects the city from the Gulf of Mexico from flooding the area. The new Seabrook floodgate prevents a storm surge from entering from Lake Pontchartrain.

The GIWW West Closure Complex closes the Gulf Intracoastal Waterway to protect the west side of the city. This complex is unique in that it contains the world's largest pumping station, necessary to pump out rainwater that is discharged in the protected side of the canal during a hurricane.

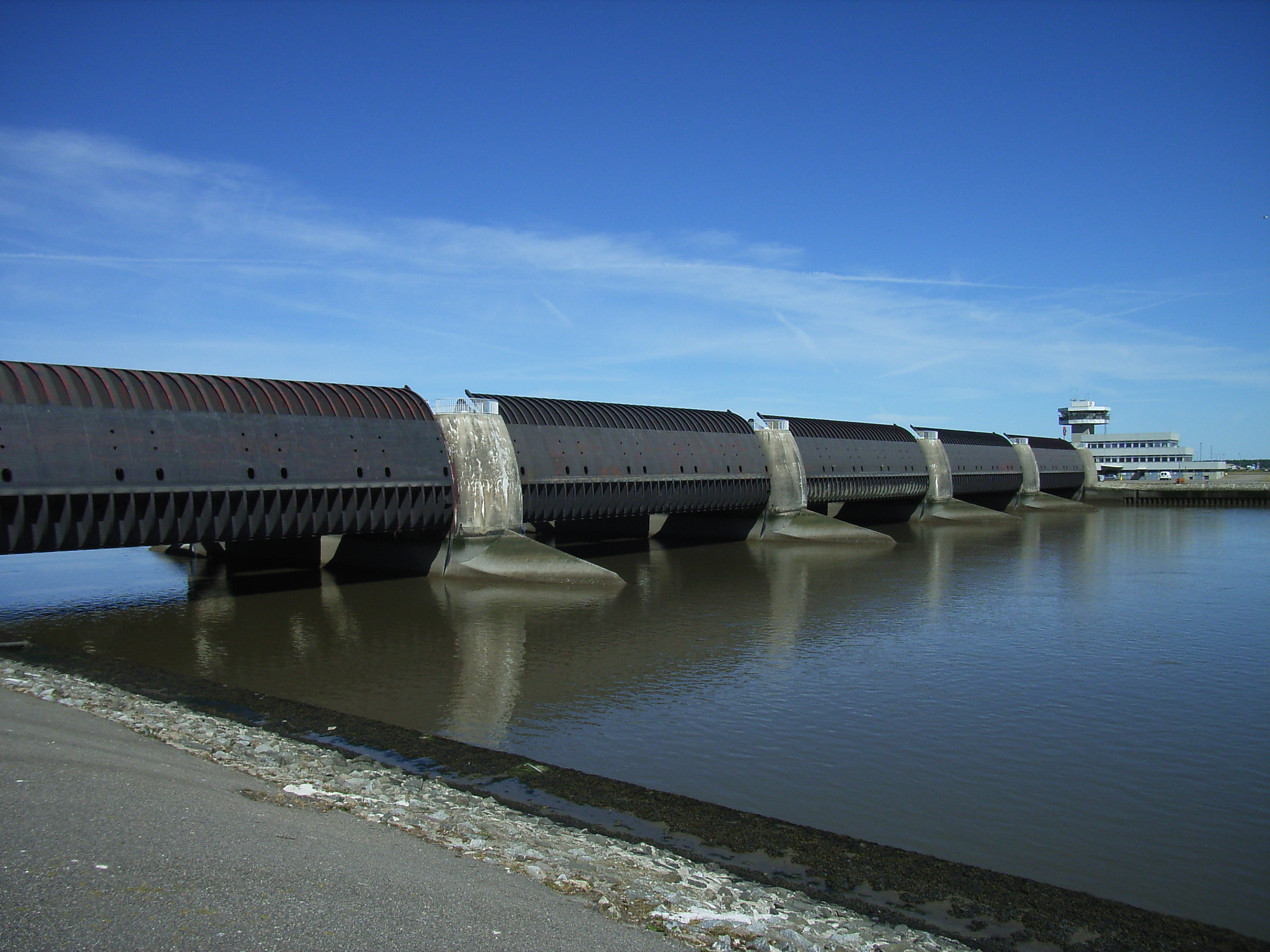
Eider Barrage, landward side, open

=== Eider Barrage ===
The Eider Barrage is located at the mouth of the river Eider near Tönning on Germany's North Sea coast. Its main purpose is protection from storm surges by the North Seas. It is Germany's largest coastal protection structure.

=== St. Petersburg Dam ===
The Saint Petersburg Dam (officially called the Saint Petersburg Flood Prevention Facility Complex) is a 16 km (9.9 mi) barrier separating the Gulf of Finland from Neva Bay to protect the city of Saint Petersburg, Russia from coastal flooding. The Soviet Union started construction of the barrier in 1978 and it was completed and made operational in 2011.

=== New England ===
The New Bedford Harbor Hurricane Barrier protects the city of New Bedford, Massachusetts, with a mostly immovable barrier of stone and fill. It has three land and one marine door for access in calm seas.

The nearby Fox Point Hurricane Barrier protects the city of Providence, Rhode Island.

The US Army Corps of Engineers also owns and operates the hurricane barrier at Stamford, CT.

=== Venice ===
The MOSE Project is intended to protect the city of Venice, Italy, and the Venetian Lagoon from flooding.

=== River Foss Barrier ===
The River Foss, York, UK has a barrier to control the inflow of fast moving water from the River Ouse that may overspill its banks upstream the Foss and flood surrounding properties.

== Proposed flood barriers ==
=== New York Harbor ===
The New York Harbor Storm-Surge Barrier is a proposed regional flood barrier system that would protect the harbor and the New York – New Jersey metropolitan region.

=== Ike Dike ===
The Ike Dike is a proposed flood barrier that would protect Houston, Texas.

== Perimeter flood barriers ==
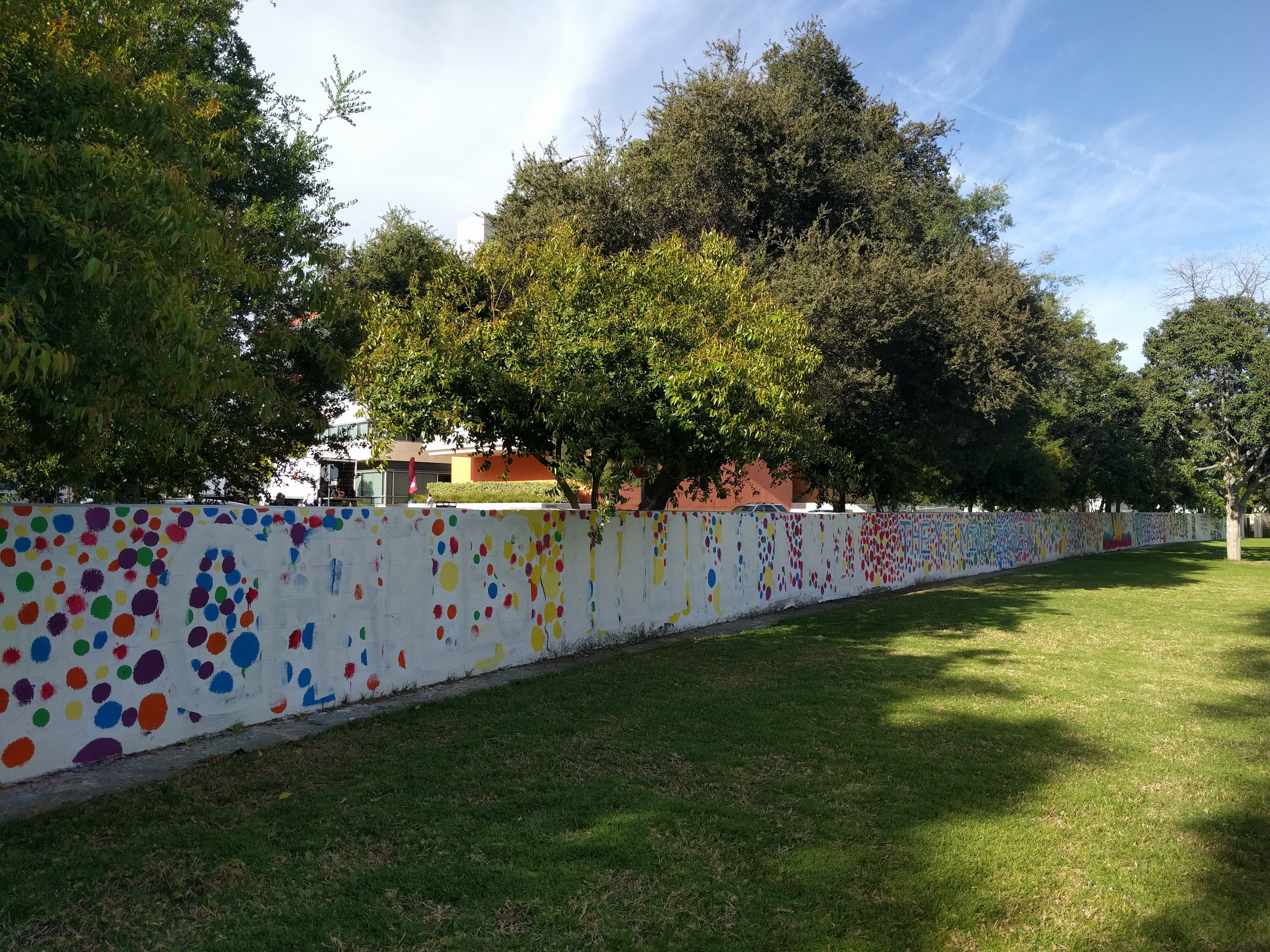
Walker Wall, a flood barrier constructed at Pomona College in Claremont, California in 1956, has since been repurposed into a free speech wall.

Flood barriers may be placed temporarily or permanently around individual buildings or at building entrances to keep floodwaters from entering those buildings. A wall constructed of sandbags is an example of a temporary barrier. A reinforced concrete wall is an example of a permanent barrier.

== Temporary barriers ==
Sandbags have traditionally been used as temporary flood barriers. However, in recent years a range of alternative mobile flood protection systems have been developed as alternatives to traditional sandbagging. These include modular self-supporting barriers, water-filled or ballast-based systems, and prefabricated panel barriers, which are designed for rapid deployment and reuse in locations where permanent flood defences are not available or practical. Systems like Haawal have been used with success, and reduced the negative consequences of flooding.
