= Florida Avenue Bridge =

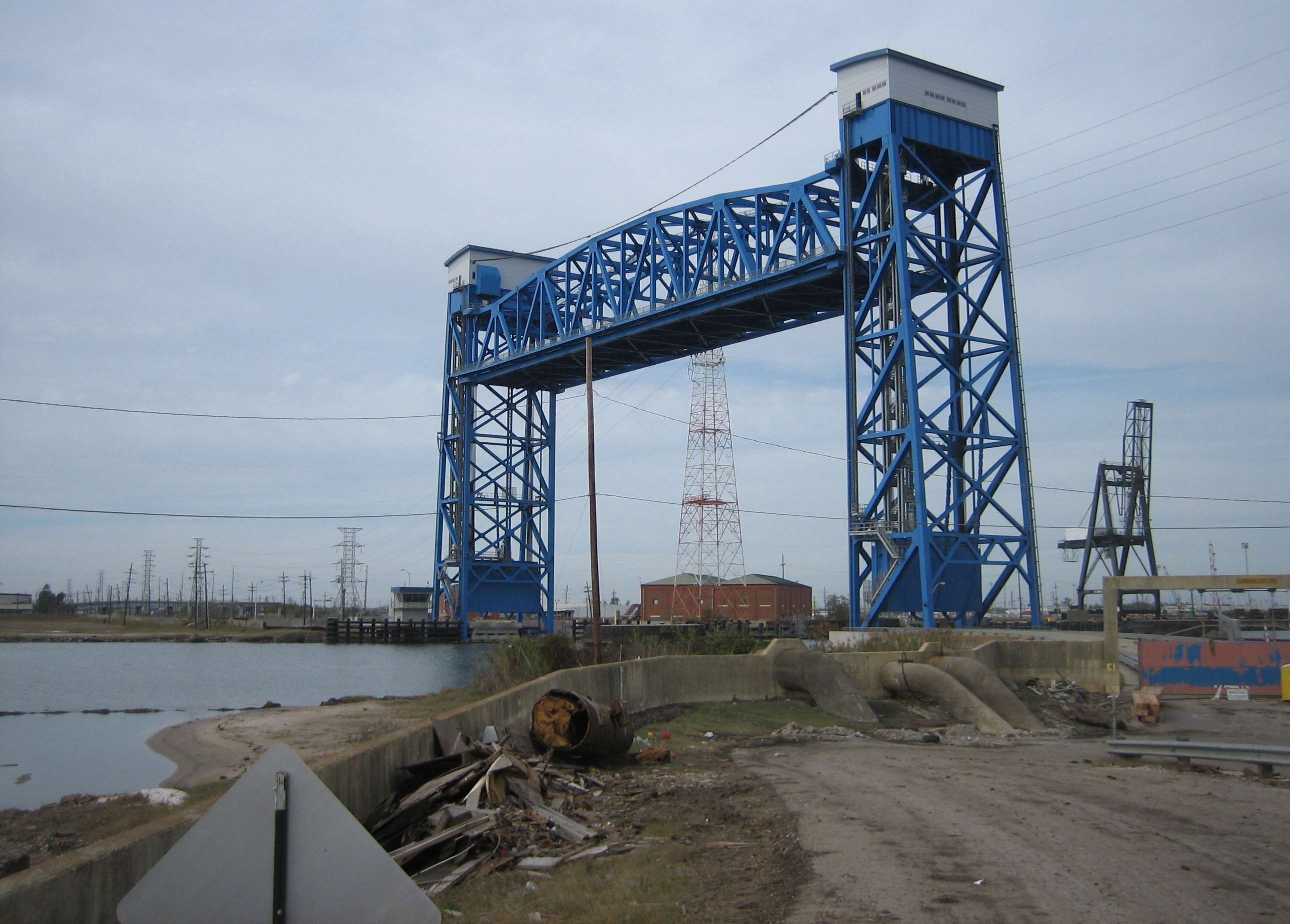
- Florida Avenue Bridge in up position (open to canal shipping, closed to land vehicle traffic), from Lower 9th Ward side.
- Coordinates: 29.981°N 90.0218°W
- Carries: trains, cars
- Crosses: Industrial Canal
- Locale: New Orleans
- Maintained by: Port of New Orleans

Characteristics
- Design: vertical lift
- Longest span: 91.5 meters (300 ft)
- Clearance below: 47.5 meters (156 ft)

The Florida Avenue Bridge is a vertical lift bridge spanning the Industrial Canal in New Orleans, Louisiana. The bridge has one railroad track, two vehicle lanes and two sidewalks. A parallel high-elevation four-lane roadway bridge is planned.

== History ==
The Florida Avenue Bridge takes its name from Florida Avenue, formerly the Florida Walk alongside the Florida Canal.

Florida Avenue was one of the first four bridges built by the Port of New Orleans in the 1920s in order to provide railroad access across the Inner Harbor-Navigational Canal, locally referred to as the Industrial Canal. The three of the original four identical bridges are in use today—St. Claude Avenue, Almonaster Avenue, and Seabrook. While St. Claude Bridge no longer carries rail service, Almonaster and Seabrook remain dedicated to rail service only. The original Florida Avenue Bridge was removed in 2000 as a hazard to marine navigation and replaced with the current modern, steel structure which was completed in May 2005. It was designed by Modjeski and Masters, Inc. and built by American Bridge with a total project cost of approximately $47 million. The new bridge was primarily funded by the United States Coast Guard under a Truman-Hobbs appropriation.

== The current bridge ==
The new bridge has a horizontal clearance of 300 feet (91 m) and 156 feet (47.5 m) vertical clearance above the low water level in the fully raised position. In the lowered position, the vertical clearance is less than five feet above the low water level position.

Most of the marine usage of the Florida Avenue site consists of towboat and barge traffic transiting from the Mississippi River, through the Corps of Engineer's Inner Harbor-Navigational CanalLock, then east following the Gulf Intracoastal Waterway. The lift bridge is capable of sufficient vertical clearance for ship traffic.

The bridge has undergone repairs due to Hurricane Katrina storm surge in 2005. It sustained flooding once again due to Hurricane Gustav in 2008. Operations of the Port of New Orleans' four bridges across the Inner Harbor-Navigational Canal, including special alerts, can be found at www.portno.com at the link for citizen resources at the link for bridges.

== Plans for a newer bridge ==
A parallel, four-lane, vehicular only, is planned to be built just south of (toward the Mississippi River from) the Port of New Orleans' existing lift bridge by the Louisiana State Department of Transportation and Development. Design is underway, but due to funding issues, the construction has been placed on hold by the State of Louisiana.
