= Seabrook Bridge =

Senator Ted Hickey Bridge
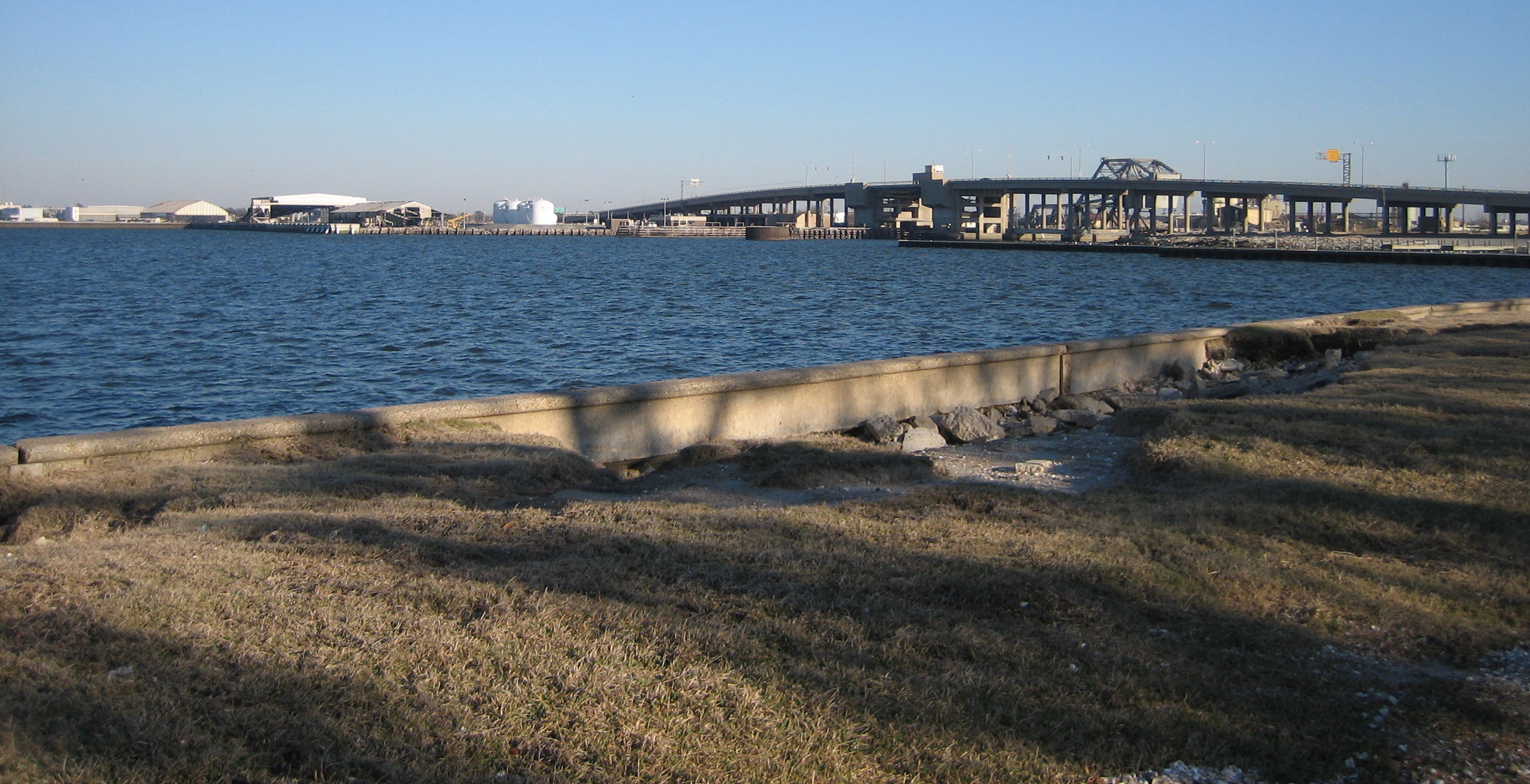
- Coordinates: 30°01′54″N 90°02′04″W
- Carries: Lakeshore Drive
- Crosses: Industrial Canal
- Locale: New Orleans, Louisiana
- Official name: Senator Ted Hickey Bridge

Characteristics
- Design: Bascule

The Seabrook Bridge (officially the Senator Ted Hickey Bridge) is a medium-rise twin bascule, four-lane roadway bridge in New Orleans, Louisiana, carrying Lakeshore Drive, connecting Leon C. Simon Drive on the upper side of the bridge with Hayne Boulevard on the lower side. The bridge is operated and maintained by the Louisiana Department of Transportation and Development (DOTD). It normally stays in the down position for vehicular traffic, but provides sufficient clearance for most marine traffic.
