= West Lake Forest, New Orleans =

Coordinates: 30.029°N 89.983°W

West Lake Forest is a neighborhood of New Orleans, Louisiana, United States. A subdistrict of the New Orleans East area, its boundaries as determined by the City Planning Commission are: Interstate 10 to the north and west, Read Boulevard to the east, and Dwyer Road to the south.

West Lake Forest has a mixture of single-family detached homes, apartment complexes, and townhomes. The neighborhood was developed mostly during the late 1960s and 1970s. New Orleans and the state of Louisiana experienced an economic decline in the late 1980s, which slowed development. Lake Forest Plaza, an 80-acre (320,000 m^{2}) 1,200,000-square-foot (110,000 m^{2}) shopping center in the heart of West Lake Forest, was hit hard by the downturn. The opening of newer, larger malls in the Greater New Orleans area also depleted its customer base.

By the 1990s, the neighborhood saw an increase in the number of low-income residents as public housing developments in other parts of the city were closed. The total population of West Lake Forest rose 5.75% between 1990 and 2000, while New Orleans as a whole declined by 2.5%.

West Lake Forest was significantly impacted by Hurricane Katrina in 2005. Over 70% of residential properties as well as nearly all commercial properties in the neighborhood received flood damage, wind damage, or both. Approximately 33.4% of West Lake Forest's pre-Katrina household population had returned to the neighborhood as of June 2008.

== Geography ==
According to the United States Census Bureau, West Lake Forest has a total area of 1.37 square miles (3.5 km^{2}). 1.35 square miles (3.5 km^{2}) of which is land and 0.02 square miles (0.1 km^{2}) of which is water.

=== Adjacent Neighborhoods ===
- Little Woods (north)
- Pine Village (west)
- Plum Orchard (south)
- Read Boulevard West (south)
- Read Boulevard East (east)

== Demographics ==
As of the census of 2000, there were 9,596 people, 3,578 households, and 2,377 family households.

As of the census of 2010, there were 4,015 people, 1,468 households, and 1,064 family households.

== See also ==
- New Orleans neighborhoods
