= Vietnamese in Louisiana =

Vietnamese people in Louisiana

In Louisiana, there are nearly 33,000 Vietnamese Americans and other people of Vietnamese descent.

== History ==
Following the Fall of Saigon in 1975, the first group of 1,000 Vietnamese families were resettled in the New Orleans area with the first families finding housing in the New Orleans East Area and on the Westbank in Marrero and approximately 500 refugees were resettled in Baton Rouge. By 1989, there were approximately 15,300 Vietnamese refugees resettled in Louisiana. Catholic dioceses of Louisiana were active in this process, with the Archdiocese of New Orleans sponsoring resettlement in Orleans and Jefferson Parishes and the Roman Catholic Diocese of Houma–Thibodaux sponsoring resettlement in St. Mary Parish, Terrebonne Parish, and Lafourche Parish.

In the 1980s and 1990s, Vietnamese people became active in the political and economic life in Louisiana, organizing voter registration drives and mobilizing against the creation of a landfill in New Orleans East adjacent to the community in Versailles. In the 21st century, environmental disasters including Hurricane Katrina and the Deepwater Horizon oil spill have displaced Vietnamese communities and harmed the economic viability of crucial industries, especially fishing.

== Language ==
In 2018, 83% of Vietnamese Louisianians reported speaking Vietnamese at home; however, there is a clear tendency for younger generations to shift towards English. Many Vietnamese Louisianians prioritize cultural and religious activities which center the language and drive language retention.

== See also ==
- Vietnamese in New Orleans
