= Interstate 510 =

Highway in Louisiana

Interstate 510
- I-510 highlighted in red

Route information
- Auxiliary route of I-10
- Maintained by Louisiana DOTD
- Length: 3.04 mi (4.89 km)
- Existed: 1992–present
- NHS: Entire route

Major junctions
- South end: LA 47 in New Orleans
- US 90 in New Orleans
- North end: I-10 / LA 47 in New Orleans

Location
- Country: United States
- State: Louisiana
- Parishes: Orleans

Highway system
- Interstate Highway System; Main; Auxiliary; Suffixed; Business; Future; Louisiana State Highway System; Interstate; US; State; Scenic
← LA 509	→ LA 510

Interstate 510 (I-510) is a short spur route of I-10 within eastern New Orleans, Louisiana, United States. It runs south from I-10, intersects with U.S. Route 90, and ends at the Almonaster Boulevard interchange, near the NASA Michoud Assembly Facility. From this point, the highway continues south over the Gulf Intracoastal Waterway / Mississippi River Gulf Outlet on the Green Bridge.

The Interstate spur route is a portion of Paris Road, a New Orleans metropolitan area roadway stretching from the Mississippi River to Lake Pontchartrain dating back to the 19th century. The portion designated I-510 is entirely within the Ninth Ward of New Orleans, though the area the highway runs through is locally known as New Orleans East.

== Route description ==
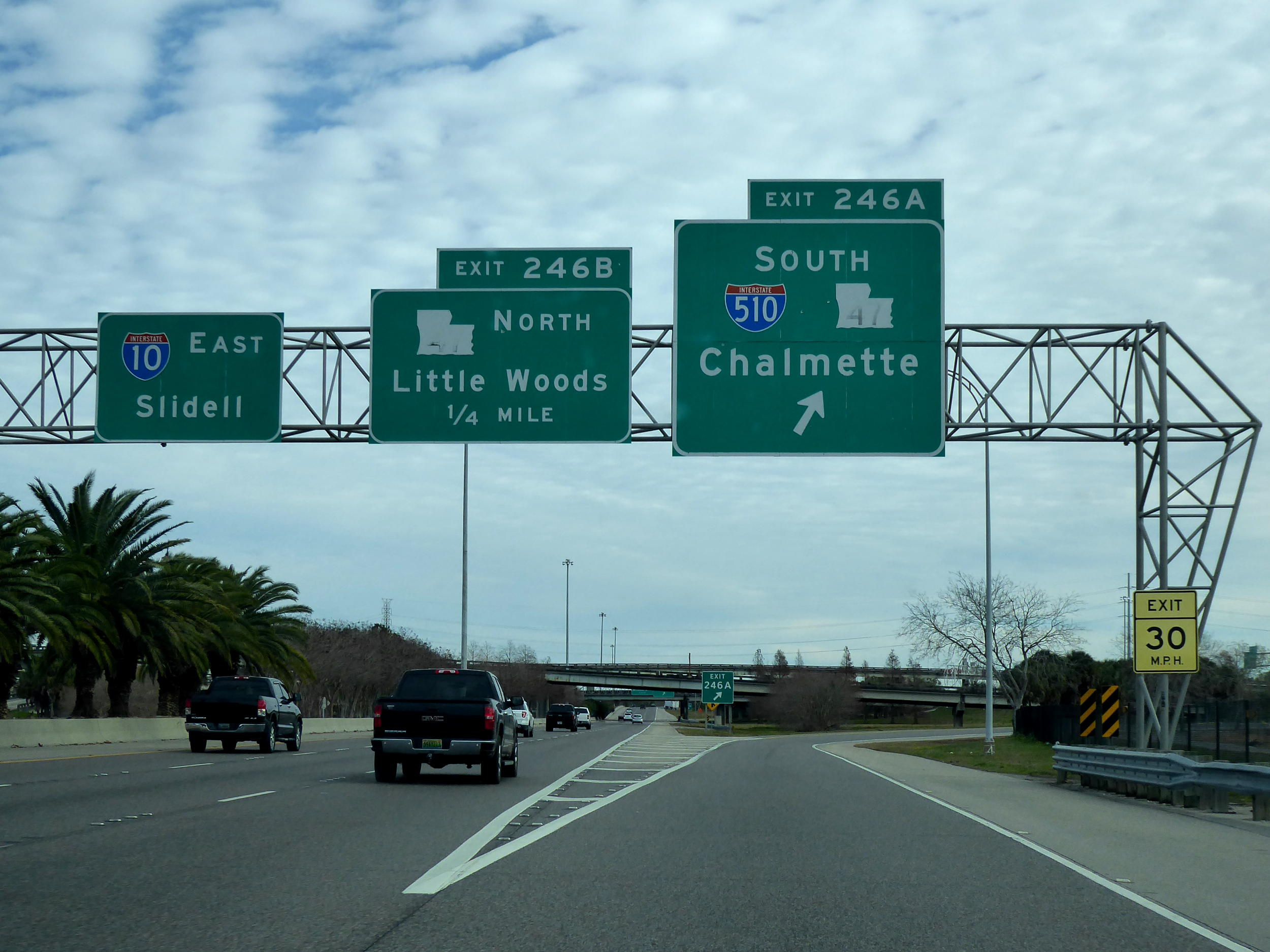
Northern terminus from I-10 eastbound.

I-510 runs concurrently with Louisiana Highway 47 (LA 47) for its entire routing. The spur serves the NASA facility, the St. Bernard Parish seat of Chalmette (though the interstate portion ends a few miles north of the city, the highway continues as Paris Road), and the former Six Flags New Orleans.

I-510 exits are numbered from the parent route to the remote terminus, as is normal for spur interstates.

== History ==
What would eventually become I-510 was originally proposed in 1970 as a replacement for Paris Road, but was subsequently delayed due to environmental concerns. By 1981, an environmental impact statement was completed, and construction on the spur would commence in 1985. The $87 million project saw its official ribbon-cutting on November 13, 1992. I-510 was once planned as part of a longer I-410 that would have also incorporated I-310 around the southern section of the New Orleans metropolitan area.

== Exit list ==
The entire highway is in New Orleans, Orleans Parish.

mi	km	Exit	Destinations	Notes
3.04	4.89	-	LA 47 south	Southern terminus
2.91	4.68	2C	Almonaster Boulevard, To Old Gentilly Road	
2.28	3.67	2A	US 90 (Chef Menteur Highway)	Signed as exits 2B (east) and 2A (west) northbound
1.15	1.85	1B	Lake Forest Boulevard	
0.00	0.00	1A	I-10 – New Orleans, Slidell	Southbound exit to I-10 west unsigned; I-10 exit 246A
0.00	0.00	-	LA 47 north – Little Woods	Northern terminus; northbound exit and southbound entrance; I-10 exit 246B
1.000 mi = 1.609 km; 1.000 km = 0.621 mi: Concurrency terminus
