= New Orleans East =

Eastern section of New Orleans

Coordinates: 30.0691°N 89.8266°W

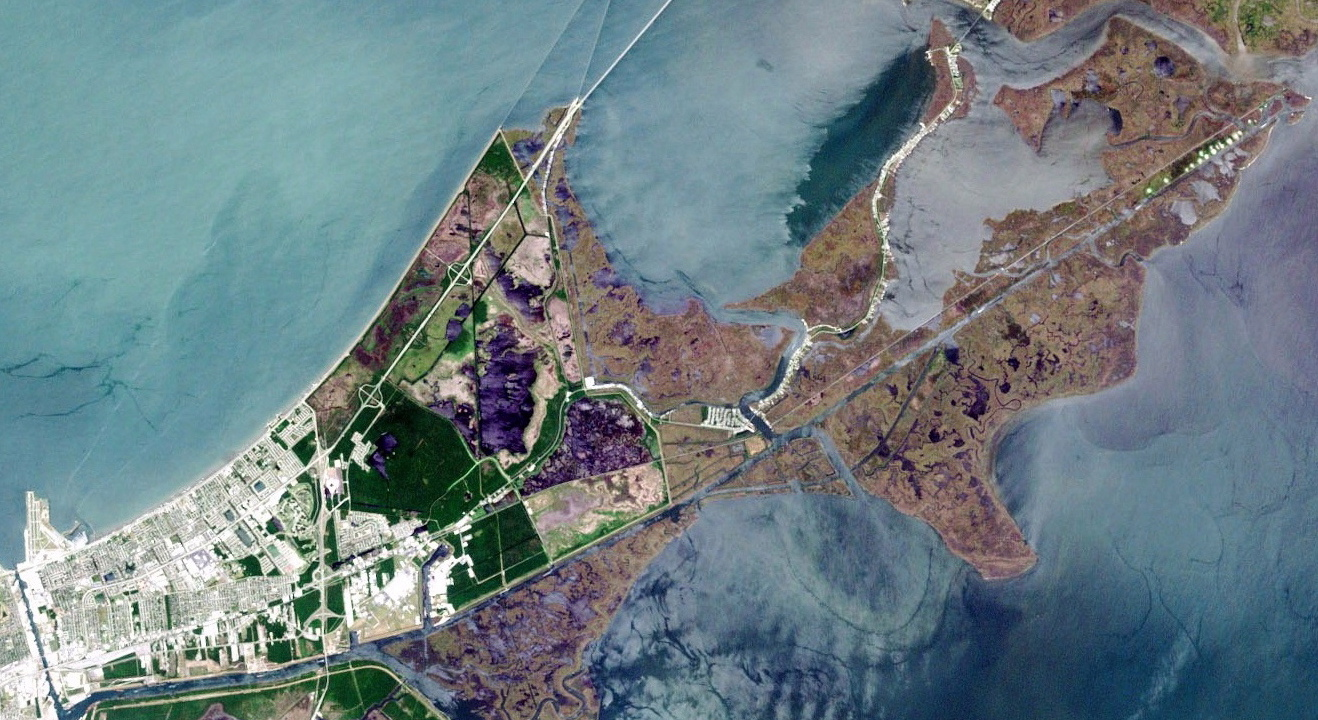
A Landsat view of New Orleans East. Note that dense development occurs exclusively in the western portion of eastern New Orleans; the remaining land is largely undeveloped swamp and marsh.

New Orleans East (also referred to as Eastern New Orleans, N.O. East and The East) is the eastern section of New Orleans, Louisiana, a large section of the 9th Ward of New Orleans, mostly undeveloped until the later 20th century. New Orleans East represents 65% of the city's total land area, but it is geographically isolated from the rest of the city by the Inner Harbor Navigational Canal (Industrial Canal). It is surrounded by water on all sides, bounded by the Industrial Canal, the Gulf Intracoastal Waterway, Lake Pontchartrain, Lake Borgne, and the Rigolets, a long deep-water strait connecting the two lakes. Interstate 10 (I-10) splits the area nearly in half, and Chef Menteur Hwy, Downman Rd, Crowder Blvd, Dwyer Rd, Lake Forest Blvd, Read Blvd, Bullard Ave, Michoud Blvd, Hayne Blvd, Morrison Rd, Bundy Rd, and Almonaster Ave serve as major streets and corridors.

As of the 2020 census, the population of eastern New Orleans is 75,223, accounting for 20% of the city’s total population. Housing ranges from low-income multifamily apartment complexes and working-class neighborhoods to middle-class single-family subdivisions and affluent, lake-centered gated communities. Neighborhoods include Pines Village, Plum Orchard, Little Woods, West Lake Forest, Read Boulevard West, Read Boulevard East, Village de L’Est, Venetian Isles, and Lake Catherine.

Economic drivers in this part of the city include the NASA Michoud Assembly Facility, New Orleans Lakefront Airport, Folgers Coffee Plant, Textron (Landing Craft Manufacturing), CSX, Faubourg Brewing Co., Crescent Crown Distributing, the National Finance Center, and the New Orleans Regional Business Park (Higgins Innovation District). A notable characteristic of New Orleans East is its abundance of green spaces, including Bayou Sauvage Urban National Wildlife Refuge, Audubon Louisiana Nature Center, Lincoln Beach, and Joe W. Brown Park.

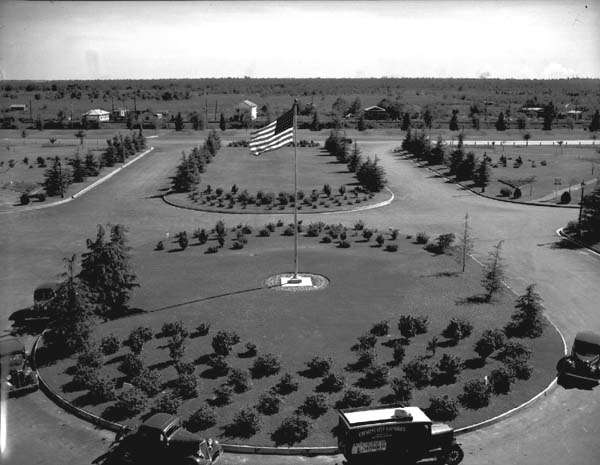
View from the tower of Shushan (now Lakefront) Airport, 1937, showing a few houses along Hayne Boulevard and mostly empty fields further south.

== History ==
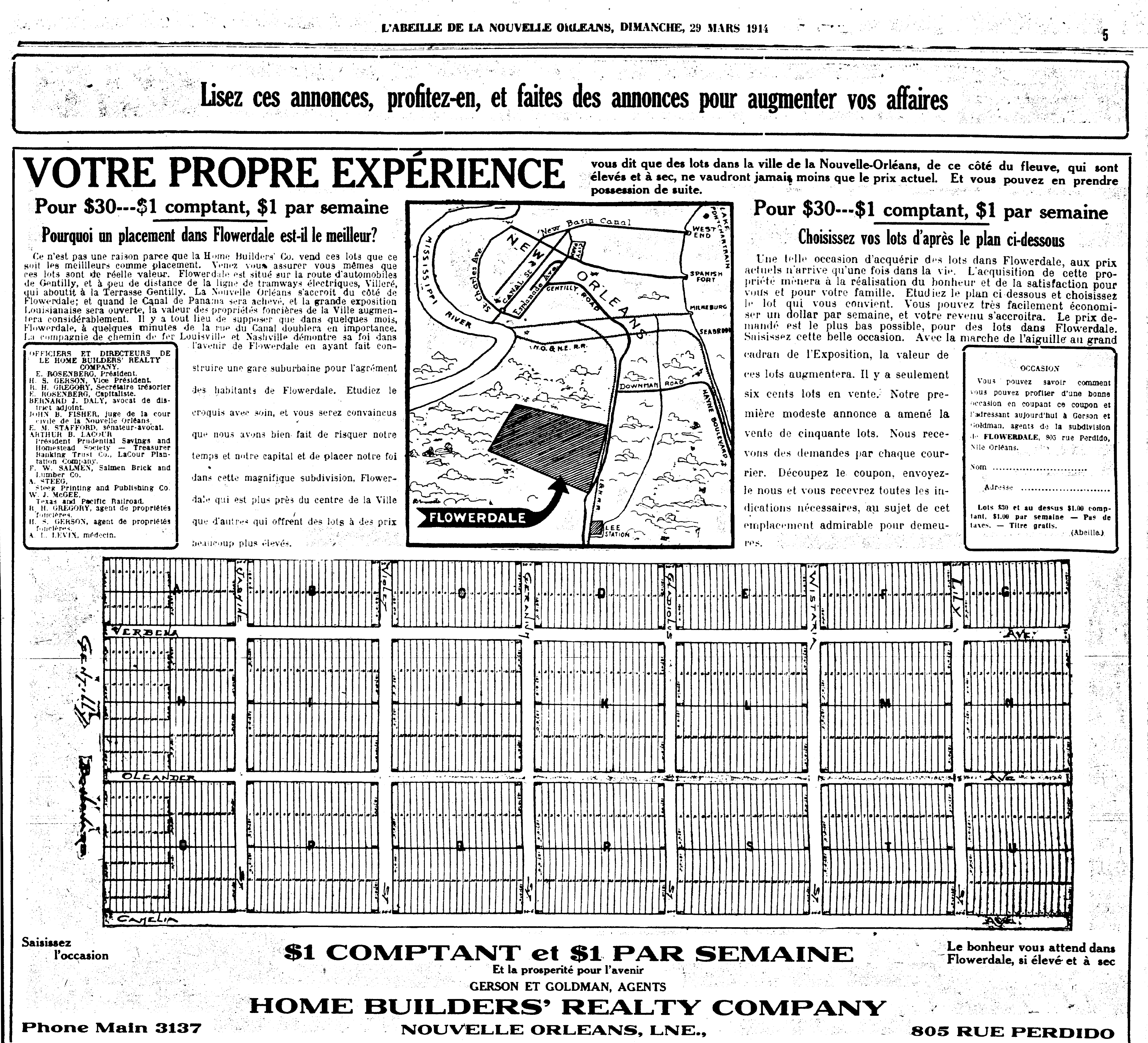
Advertisement for proposed development "Flowerdale", from The New Orleans Bee in 1914; the area was not developed as planned and is now under a landfill.

Until the late 19th century, this area was outside of the city limits of New Orleans, although within Orleans Parish.

Eastern New Orleans' post-colonial history dates back to the early 1800s, with the construction of Fort Pike and Fort Macomb in what is now called the Lake Catherine neighborhood. The two forts were constructed to serve as a defense for the navigational channels leading into New Orleans. Also built in the Lake Catherine neighborhood was the Rigolets Lighthouse.

Other developments in the 1800s were the construction of the forerunner to Chef Menteur Highway in Village de L’Est and a sugar cane plantation and refinery in Venetian Isles. With this road completed by mid-century, Chef Menteur Highway was, at the time, the only access road that connected the eastern area to the rest of the city.

Much of the area being marshland, completion of the highway required damming, draining and filling remnants of a distributary known as Bayou Metairie. There was little development other than in two areas. The first hugged the long, narrow ridge of higher ground along Gentilly Road/Chef Menteur Highway, which followed the natural levee of an old bayou. Various farms, plantations, and small villages such as Michoud were sited along this ridge. The other older area of development consisted of a linear strip of "camps", clusters of houses raised high on wooden stilts, in the shallows along the edge of Lake Pontchartrain, the largest and longest-lasting of these being at Little Woods.

In the early 20th century some residential development of the area began, at first as an extension of Gentilly. Construction of the Industrial Canal began in 1918 and was completed in 1923, creating the principal geographical barrier that would separate Eastern New Orleans from the rest of city. Eastern New Orleans' present southern boundary was realized in 1944 with the completion of a re-routing of the Intracoastal Waterway, involving the excavation of a new segment stretching east from the Industrial Canal to the Rigolets, cut through the raw swampland south of the Gentilly Ridge and north of Bayou Bienvenue.

From the 1930s to the 1960s, Lincoln Beach, on the shore of Lake Pontchartrain, was the city's amusement park for the African-American community.

When Hurricane Betsy was bearing down on the city in 1965, eastern New Orleans was the only section for which an evacuation was called, as there was concern that this section of the city might suffer particularly extreme effects. However other than light flooding near the Morrison Canal, damage from Betsy was much more modest than had been feared. However, some of those who evacuated in advance of Betsy's arrival sought refuge in the Lower 9th Ward, which flooded disastrously.

Rapid growth east of the Industrial Canal commenced in the 1960s, during the administration of Mayor Vic Schiro (1961–1970). Many new subdivisions were developed in the 1960s and 1970s, to cater to those who preferred a more suburban lifestyle but were open to remaining within the city limits of New Orleans. Eastern New Orleans grew in a comparatively well-planned and neatly zoned fashion. Some care was taken to avoid placing major thoroughfares along the rights-of-way of unsightly drainage canals, as had frequently occurred in suburban Jefferson Parish. Instead, major roads (e.g., Mayo, Crowder, Bundy, Read, Bullard, etc.) were located equidistant from parallel canals and were outfitted with landscaped medians (neutral grounds in the local vernacular).

Numerous subdivisions were developed with large lakes at their centers, providing both an assist to neighborhood drainage and a scenic backdrop for the backyards of homes. From the late 1960s onwards, buried utilities were required, lending to new development in eastern New Orleans a pleasingly uncluttered visual appearance quite distinct from the wire-hung stoplight signals, tangled webs of power lines, and forests of leaning utility poles common to suburban New Orleans. Though modern-day Eastern New Orleans was never segregated, the area originally grew to prominence as a majority-white "suburb-within-the-city". By 1980, the area had also received significant commercial office and retail investment, epitomized by the regional mall The Plaza at Lake Forest, the largest in Greater New Orleans at the time of its completion in 1974.

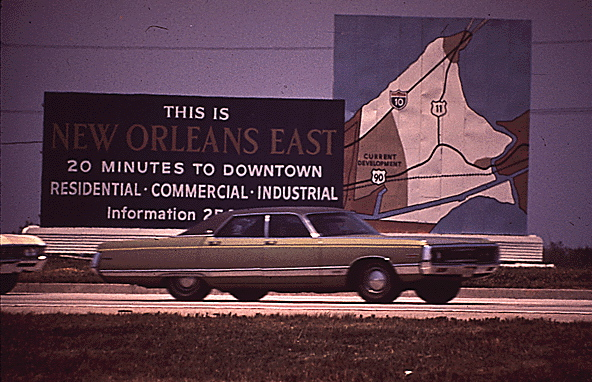
Billboard promoting the eastern New Orleans "New Town" development, 1972. Note the darker-toned 'Current Development' portion, encompassing present-day Village de L'Est and Oak Island, as well as Venetian Isles and a sliver of Irish Bayou. The light-toned portion is mostly today's Bayou Sauvage National Wildlife Refuge

However, the 1980s witnessed a sea-change in demographics, as New Orleans' growing African American middle class began moving into eastern New Orleans in sizable numbers. More importantly, in the wake of the 1986 Oil Bust significant poverty was introduced into eastern New Orleans, as many of the sprawling garden apartment complexes built in the 1960s and 1970s along I-10 to house upwardly mobile young singles began to accept large, poor, female-headed households as tenants. With increased poverty came increased crime rates, and both non-violent and violent crime became far more common than had been the case in the 1960s or 1970s. These changes were enough to induce a swift exodus of most of the white population, resulting in an eastern New Orleans that was overwhelmingly African-American by 2005.

Much more development further east was envisioned during the oil boom of the 1970s, including a huge planned community called, in successive iterations "New Orleans East", "Pontchartrain", "Orlandia", and, finally, "New Orleans East" once more. This "new-town-in-town" was to have resembled Reston, Virginia or the Woodlands north of Houston, but only a few small portions were built in several bursts of activity in the twenty years prior to the Oil Bust. Both the Village de L'Est and Oak Island neighborhoods were phases of "New Orleans East". The new town development would have occupied almost all of New Orleans lying east of the present-day route of I-510.

Three identical interchanges along I-10 east of Paris Road were constructed in anticipation of the new town. The Michoud Boulevard exit uses one of these interchanges, but two of the three were never used. The prominent "New Orleans East" cast-concrete sign just west of the Michoud Boulevard exit was fabricated circa 1980 during the final attempt at developing this huge tract. Much of this land later became the Bayou Sauvage National Wildlife Refuge, the largest urban wildlife refuge in the United States. Though the "New Orleans East" new town development was never realized, by the 1970s its name had been adopted by many New Orleanians to refer to all of New Orleans east of the Industrial Canal and north of MRGO.

A new international airport for New Orleans was also envisioned for the far eastern portion of the area on several occasions. In the late 1960s, formal government-sponsored studies were undertaken to evaluate the feasibility of relocating New Orleans International Airport to a new site, contemporaneous with similar efforts that were ultimately successful in Houston (George Bush Intercontinental Airport) and Dallas (Dallas/Fort Worth International Airport). This attempt got as far as recommending a specific runway configuration and site in eastern New Orleans; a man-made island was to be created south of I-10 and north of U.S. Route 90 in a bay of Lake Pontchartrain. However, in the early 1970s it was decided that the current airport should be expanded instead. New Orleans Mayor Sidney Barthelemy, in office from 1986 to 1994, later reintroduced the idea of building a new international airport for the city, with consideration given to other sites in eastern New Orleans, as well as on the Northshore in suburban St. Tammany Parish. Facing strong opposition from environmentalists, the Times-Picayune and many residents of eastern New Orleans, Barthelemy's idea came to nothing.

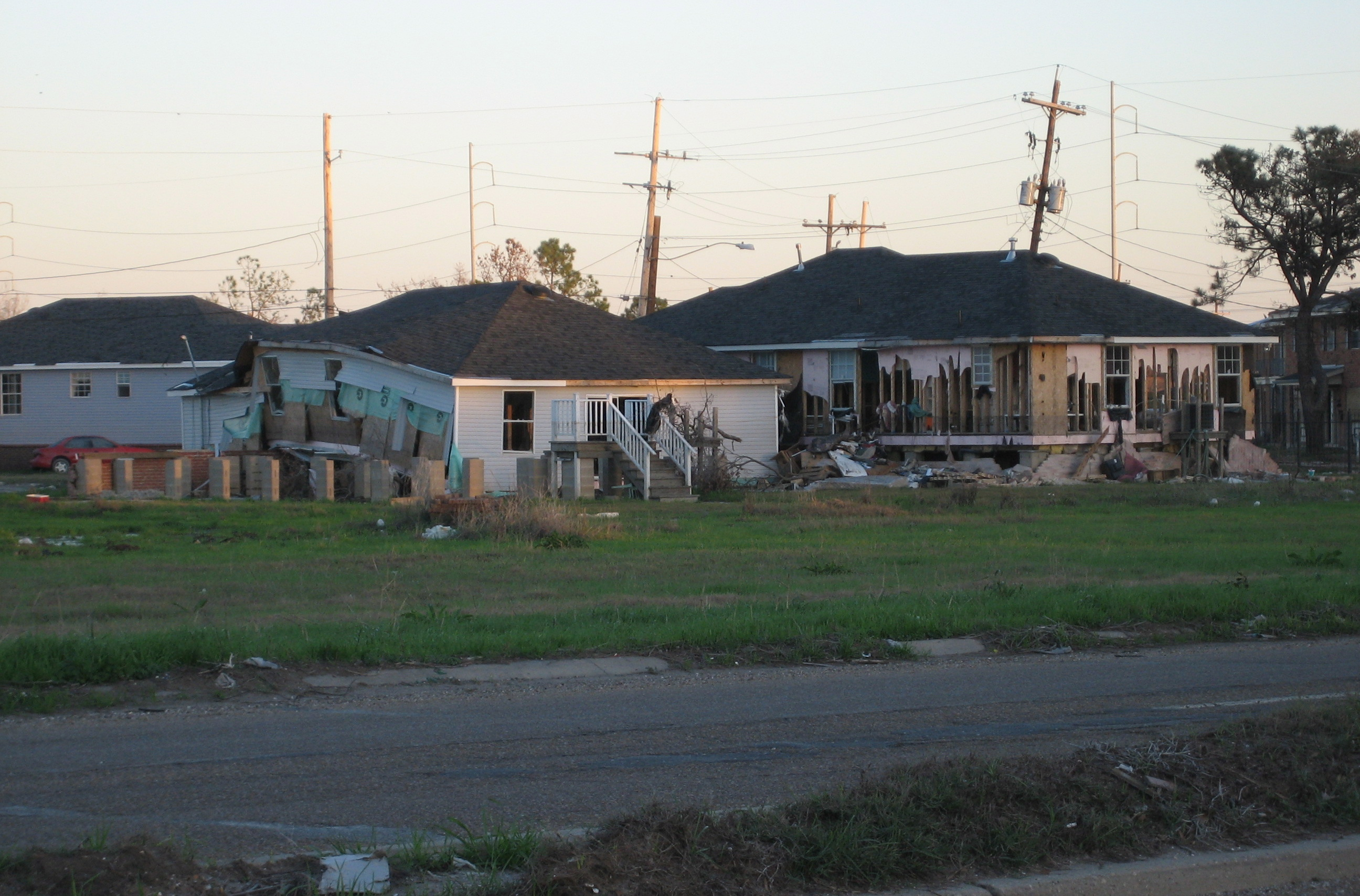
Damaged houses in Eastern New Orleans after Katrina

On August 29, 2005, the majority of eastern New Orleans flooded severely from Hurricane Katrina and associated levee failures (see: Effect of Hurricane Katrina on New Orleans). Recovery initially unfolded slowly. By early 2006, only a handful of businesses had reopened, mostly those sited along the historic Gentilly Ridge (i.e., the Chef Menteur Highway corridor). Utility service was fully restored to the area during the course of 2006. As of January 2007, still less than half of the pre-Katrina residential population had returned, and many were living in FEMA trailers as they gutted and repaired their flood-devastated homes. Some residents returned on weekends to repair their property, while others gave up and abandoned the area.

By November 2006 only 40,000 residents had returned to eastern New Orleans, compared to the 95,000 that had inhabited the area before the levee failures. However, consistent with the ongoing recovery in New Orleans' population from its post-Katrina trough, eastern New Orleans' population likewise continued to increase. By 2010, more than half of eastern New Orleans' pre-Katrina population had returned. The returning population was more affluent: determined to permanently reduce the neighborhood's quantity of multi-family housing, eastern New Orleans homeowners lobbied against many rental developments proposed in the post-Katrina era.

As a consequence considerably less multi-family rental housing is available now in eastern New Orleans than existed pre-Katrina. Essential neighborhood services became scarcer as well after 2005. Only one grocery store reopened, post-Katrina, and the national retailers who had flocked to eastern New Orleans in the 1960s and 1970s, and even into the 1980s and 1990s, were slow to return. Furthermore, neither Methodist nor Lakeland hospitals reopened after Katrina, leaving eastern New Orleans without a general hospital and bereft of ER care for many years. New Orleans East Hospital (NOEH), sited within the rehabilitated former Methodist Hospital, opened in 2014, making it the first hospital to operate in the area since Katrina.

In the years following Hurricane Katrina, the pace of recovery in eastern New Orleans has accelerated, though the area still faces challenges. Many retail shops have opened, with a particular concentration emerging at the intersection of I-10 and Bullard Avenue. This commercial node, largely populated by family-owned businesses, is now enjoying the long-awaited return of national retailers, with Big Lots and Wal-Mart leading the way. Consistent with eastern New Orleans' eve-of-Katrina concentration of African-American entrepreneurship, black-owned franchises, such as the USA Neighborhood Market, have also appeared. To the west of Bullard, along the Read Boulevard corridor, a new CVS Pharmacy has opened across Lake Forest Boulevard from the recently completed Daughters of Charity Health Center and New Orleans East Hospital.

Significant public investment has lately transpired in eastern New Orleans as well, including NOEH, the new regional public library, ongoing improvements to Joe Brown Memorial Park, and the construction of half-a-dozen new public school buildings. Efforts to secure high-quality private investment on the site of the former Plaza regional mall continue, and the city in late 2020 issued a Request For Proposals ("RFP") addressing the shuttered Six Flags/Jazzland amusement park, located prominently at the intersection of I-10 and I-510. The amusement park was closed as a precautionary measure in advance of Hurricane Katrina's landfall, but Six Flags opted not to re-open it, post-Katrina.

On February 7, 2017, an EF3 wedge tornado damaged or destroyed several buildings in eastern New Orleans. There were 33 injuries, six of which were serious.

In May 2025, Peter Gardner, President of the Chef Downman Business Association mentioned a high level of prostitution at the Chef Menteur Highway and Downman Road cross section.

== Neighborhoods ==
Eastern New Orleans encompasses an enormous area, though most of this part of town remains undeveloped wetlands. Within the developed portion, numerous distinct neighborhoods may be found, including Pines Village, Plum Orchard, West Lake Forest, Read Boulevard West, Little Woods, Read Boulevard East, Village de L’Est, Lake Catherine and Venetian Isles.

=== Pines Village ===
Pines Village, the area closest to Chef Menteur Highway and the Industrial Canal, was one of the first neighborhoods to be developed in eastern New Orleans. The neighborhood's namesake, Sigmund Pines, purchased and developed it with residences in the 1950s. Developing the neighborhood included leveeing the marshy area and lowering the water table by pumping, raising the level of construction sites by use of hydraulic fill and finally, building a drainage system consisting of a series of lakes and canals.

=== Smaller neighborhoods ===
Today, eastern New Orleans also includes many smaller neighborhoods named after lakes, streets, and subdivisions such as Lake Willow, Spring Lake, Kenilworth, Seabrook, Melia, Edgelake, Bonita Park, Donna Villa, Willowbrook, Cerise-Evangeline Oaks and Castle Manor.

=== Read Boulevard East ===
Originally named Lake Forest, as development first centered along the easternmost segment of Lake Forest Boulevard, the Read Boulevard East area began growing in the 1970s and continues to develop. By the late 1990s, the neighborhoods of Read Boulevard East were no longer majority white, but were particularly favored as the preferred place of residence for New Orleans' upwardly mobile African-American white-collar professional and entrepreneurial classes.

=== Neighborhoods east of I-510 ===
Little development exists east of I-510, although this vast tract still lies within the city limits of New Orleans. It includes the Bayou Sauvage National Wildlife Refuge, Chef Menteur Pass, Fort Macomb, historic Fort Pike on the Rigolets, and scattered areas of essentially rural character, like Venetian Isles, Irish Bayou and Lake Saint Catherine.

=== Village de L'Est ===
Village de L'Est, one of the few densely developed neighborhoods east of I-510, is known for its Vietnamese community. The Vietnamese community is also known as Versailles, as the earliest migrants to the area, arriving in the years after 1975, settled first in the Versailles Arms apartment complex. The commercial hub for this community extends along Alcee Fortier Boulevard, within Village de L'Est. Sometimes known as "Little Vietnam", the area hosts a number of Vietnamese restaurants, including Dong Phuong Restaurant & Bakery. On the corner of Dwyer Blvd and Willowbrook Dr. is the Mary Queen of Vietnam Church which serves as at hub for Vietnamese people whether christian or not to celebrate community and bring unity within the children and families all around.

== Landmarks ==
Eastern New Orleans institutions and landmarks include the Lakefront Airport, Joe Brown Memorial Park, the Audubon Louisiana Nature Center, Lincoln Beach, and NASA's Michoud Assembly Facility, located within the New Orleans Regional Business Park.

Also present is the Lafon Nursing Facility, one of the oldest nursing homes in the United States.

== Infrastructure ==
The New Orleans Power Station and former Michoud Power Station are located at the foot of the Paris Road Bridge in eastern New Orleans.

Notably, eastern New Orleans is the only extensive suburban or suburban-style region of Greater New Orleans where, since the late 1960s, all installed utilities have been buried below ground. Like the downtown New Orleans/French Quarter central core and the Garden City-inspired Lakefront neighborhoods of Lake Vista, Lakeshore, Lake Terrace and Lake Oaks, eastern New Orleans consequently possesses a uniquely uncluttered visual aspect, in contrast to the omnipresent wooden utility poles and spider's web of power lines found along most of the major thoroughfares of suburban Jefferson and St. Tammany parishes. Greater resilience to power outages is another, not inconsiderable benefit to having buried power lines.

== Geology ==
Because eastern New Orleans, and particularly Michoud, rests on the edge of a fault line, the land and the levees protecting it are sinking. Recent geological studies project the rate of sinking to be around two inches per year.

== NOEEDF ==
NOEEDF is a Development fund in New Orleans that provides economic growth, job creation, and community development all over New Orleans and especially in the East.

The NOEEDF has been around since 1995 and was created due to voter-approved propositions. The propositions authorized the use of dedicated tax to support the economic development of New Orleans. The fund has been used to support local businesses and infrastructure projects located in New Orleans East, with the intention of profiting economically in the East. Some of the efforts include supporting the New Orleans Business Regional Park and helping the growth in the Lake Forest Boulevard Business Association. The NOEEDF has made significant advancements. Over 160 new permanent job locations were made in the East due to the NOEEDF, jobs ranging from Dixie Brewery to LM Wind Power. However, due to the New Orleans East high Crime rate the production of these economic changes have been slow but that have not been forgotten. The NOEEDF still plan on bolstering the area's economic prospects and hope this will decrease the crime rate there as well.

== Education ==
=== Primary and secondary schools ===
==== Public ====
The New Orleans Public Schools system, now composed exclusively of charter schools, provides administrative oversight to numerous public charter schools in eastern New Orleans.

- Marion Abramson High School was located in eastern New Orleans. It closed in 2005 after Hurricane Katrina.
- The Abramson Science and Technology Charter School opened on the grounds of the former Abramson High School in 2007.
- In 2010, Sci Academy (New Orleans Charter Science and Math Academy) moved to a group of modular buildings at the Abramson site from another group of modular buildings. As of 2010, most students come from East New Orleans and Gentilly. The Abramson campus property is adjacent to the campus of the Sarah T. Reed Elementary School.
- Sarah T. Reed High School is in eastern New Orleans.
- Miller-McCoy Academy, an all boys' charter secondary school, was in eastern New Orleans from 2008 to 2015.

==== Private ====
- St. Mary's Academy, founded by Venerable Mother Henriette DeLille and the Sisters of the Holy Family in 1867.

=== Public libraries ===
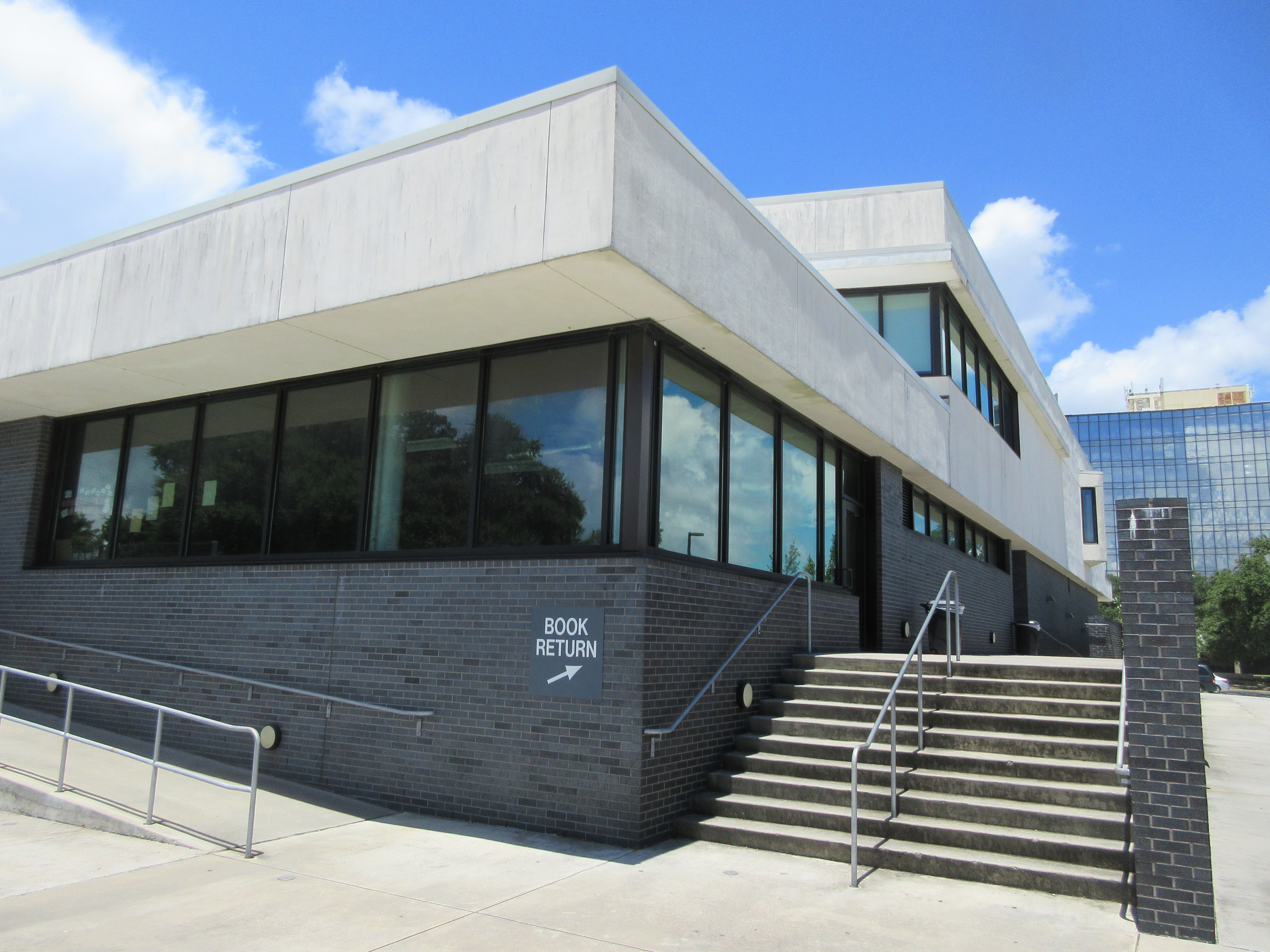
New 2012 Public Library building on Read Road

The New Orleans Public Library operates eastern New Orleans New Orleans Branch. The current branch building, a striking contemporary structure with a price tag of $7.6 million, opened in 2012. The 27,000-square-foot (2,500 m^{2}) building was designed by Gould Evans Affiliates of Kansas City, Missouri, and built by Gibbs Construction. Gould Evans worked with New Orleans firm Lee Ledbetter & Associates to design this library and four others. It is similar to, though somewhat smaller than the Algiers Regional Library, completed around the same time.

== Notable people ==
- Curren$y (Shante Franklin), rapper from eastern New Orleans
- Amanda Bonam, artist activist
- Ruby Bridges, activist
- Poppy Z. Brite, grew up in eastern New Orleans
- Will Clark, professional baseball player
- Jacoby Jones, professional football player; his family house was destroyed by Hurricane Katrina
- Aaron Neville, R&B singer
- Irma Thomas, Grammy Award winner - "Soul Queen of New Orleans"
- Hong Chau, Oscar-nominated actress

== See also ==
- University of New Orleans
- Lake Pontchartrain
- Hurricane Katrina
- Vietnamese in New Orleans
- Slidell, Louisiana
