= Darrell Willis =

Darrell Willis may refer to:

- Darral Willis (born 1996), American basketball player
- Darryl Willis (born c. 1969), American geologist and publicist
