= Pines Village, New Orleans =

Coordinates: 30.019°N 90.022°W

Pines Village is a neighborhood in the city of New Orleans, Louisiana, United States. A subdistrict of the New Orleans East area, its boundaries as defined by the City Planning Commission are: Downman Road and Interstate 10 to the east, Chef Menteur Highway to the south, Lake Pontchartrain and Morrison Road to the north, and the Industrial Canal to the west.

Sigmund Pines, the neighborhood's namesake, purchased a large piece of land closest to the Industrial Canal in the 1950s and developed it with residences. Well into the 1960s, a substantial number of homes – both doubles and single-family detached structures – were constructed. As one of the lowest-lying areas in eastern New Orleans, homes were constructed on raised pier foundations.

Pines Village contains one local park, several churches, and a notable amount of industrial and commercial developments.

The neighborhood was significantly impacted by Hurricane Katrina in 2005. Over 90% of residential properties as well as nearly all commercial properties in the neighborhood received flood damage, wind damage, or both. Approximately 46.2% of West Lake Forest's pre-Katrina household population had returned to the neighborhood as of June 2008.

== Geography ==
According to the United States Census Bureau, Pines Village has a total area of 1.39 square miles (3.6 km^{2}). 1.30 square miles (3.4 km^{2}) of which is land and 0.09 square miles (0.2 km^{2}) of which is water.

=== Adjacent Neighborhoods ===
- Gentilly Woods (west)
- Little Woods (north)
- Plum Orchard (east)
- Pontchartrain Park (west)
- Viavant/Venetian Isles (south)
- West Lake Forest (east)

== Demographics ==
As of the census of 2000, there were 5,092 people, 1,699 households, 1,339 family households.

As of the census of 2010, there were 3,410 people, 1,187 households, 844 family households.

== See also ==
- New Orleans neighborhoods
