= Bayou Sauvage National Wildlife Refuge =

National Wildlife Refuge within the city limits of New Orleans

- IUCN category IV (habitat/species management area)
- Location within Louisiana
- Nearest city: New Orleans, Louisiana
- Coordinates: 30°05′N 89°51′W
- Area: 22,770 acres (92.1 km^{2})
- Established: 1990; 36 years ago
- Governing body: U.S. Fish and Wildlife Service
- Website: Bayou Sauvage National Wildlife Refuge

Bayou Sauvage National Wildlife Refuge

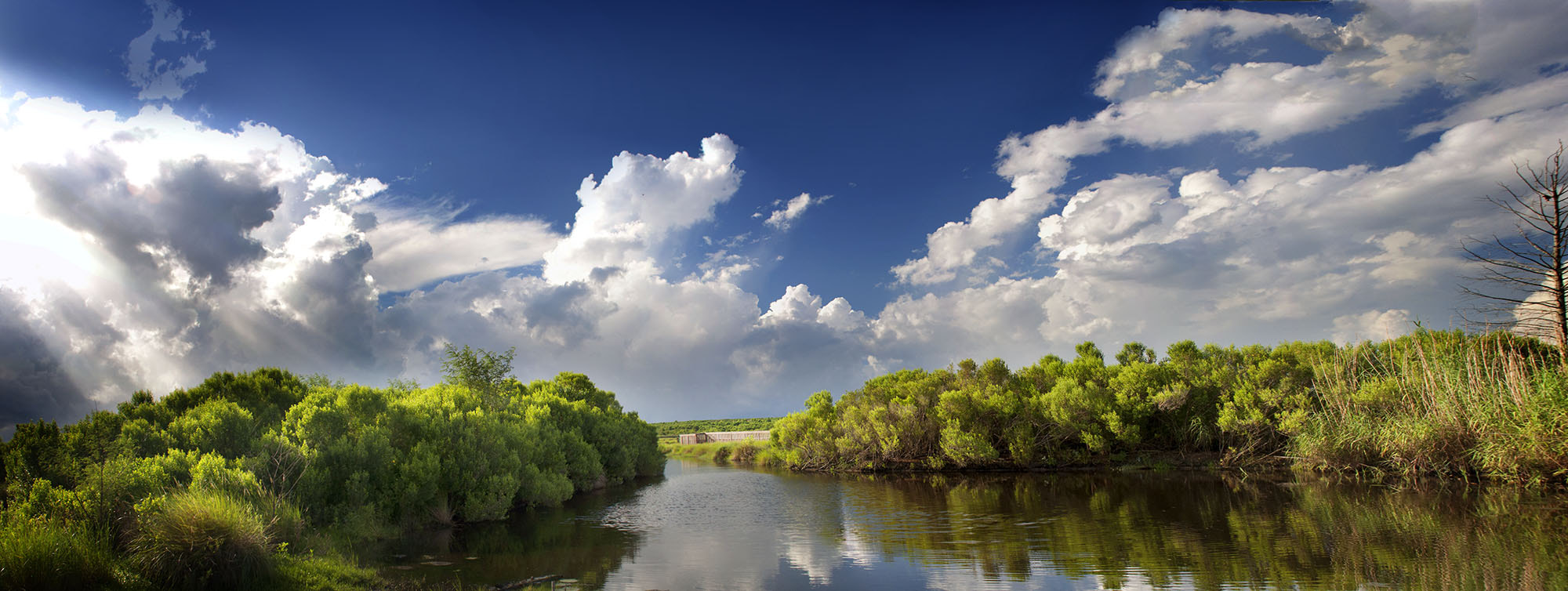
Bayou Sauvage in 2010

Bayou Sauvage National Wildlife Refuge is a 23,000-acre (93 km^{2}) region of fresh and brackish marshes located within the city limits of New Orleans. It is the largest urban wildlife refuge in the United States.

== Location ==
Bayou Sauvage is in the eastern portion of Eastern New Orleans. Most of the refuge is inside massive hurricane protection levees, built to hold back storm surges and maintain water levels in the low-lying city. This is because the present-day refuge was for decades slated as the site for an enormous, master-planned community named, in various iterations, "Pontchartrain", "Orlandia" and "New Orleans East". Three interchanges with I-10 were constructed to accommodate the development; two of the three were never used and appear as "ghost exits" to contemporary motorists.

== Habitat ==
The refuge contains a variety of different habitats, including freshwater and brackish marshes, bottomland hardwood forests, lagoons, canals, borrow pits, chenieres (former beach fronts) and natural bayous. The marshes along Lakes Pontchartrain and Borgne serve as estuarine nurseries for various fish species, crabs and shrimp. Freshwater lagoons, bayous and ponds serve as production areas for largemouth bass, crappie, bluegill and catfish. The diverse habitats meet the needs of 340 bird species during various seasons of the year. Peak waterfowl populations of 75,000 use the wetland areas during the fall, winter, and early spring months.

== Wildlife ==
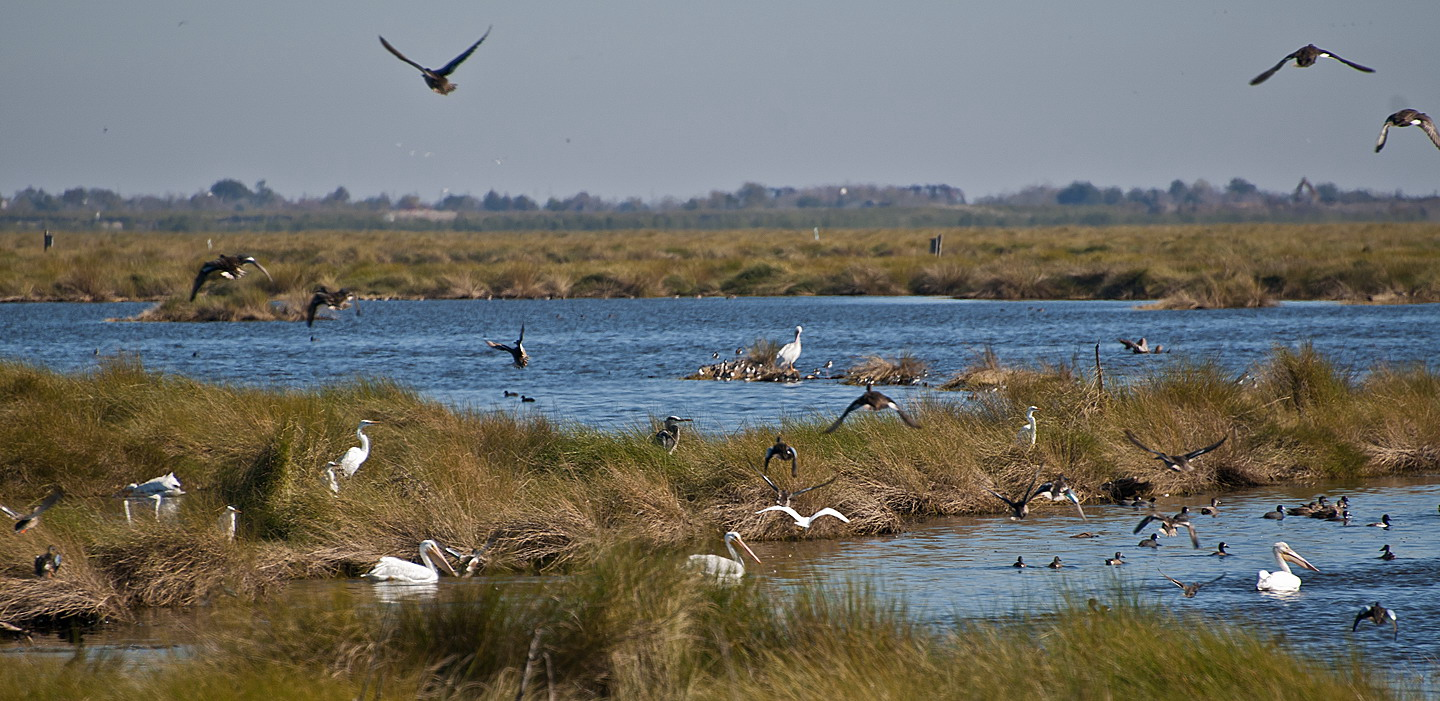
Waterbirds in a wetlands management area of Bayou Sauvage National Wildlife Refuge.

An enormous wading bird rookery can be found in the swamps of the refuge from May until July, while tens of thousands of waterfowl winter in its marshes.

The brown pelican is a year-round resident of southeast Louisiana. The number of nesting brown pelicans has substantially increased despite loss of nesting habitat. Brown pelicans are frequent users of the refuge. Several bald eagles, another threatened species, visit the refuge each year.

Other wildlife include waterfowl, wading birds, shorebirds, marsh rabbits, white pelicans, alligators, and other raptors, game and small mammals, reptiles and amphibians.

== See also ==
- List of National Wildlife Refuges: Louisiana
