= Pontchartrain Park, New Orleans =

Pontchartrain Park
- New Orleans Neighborhood
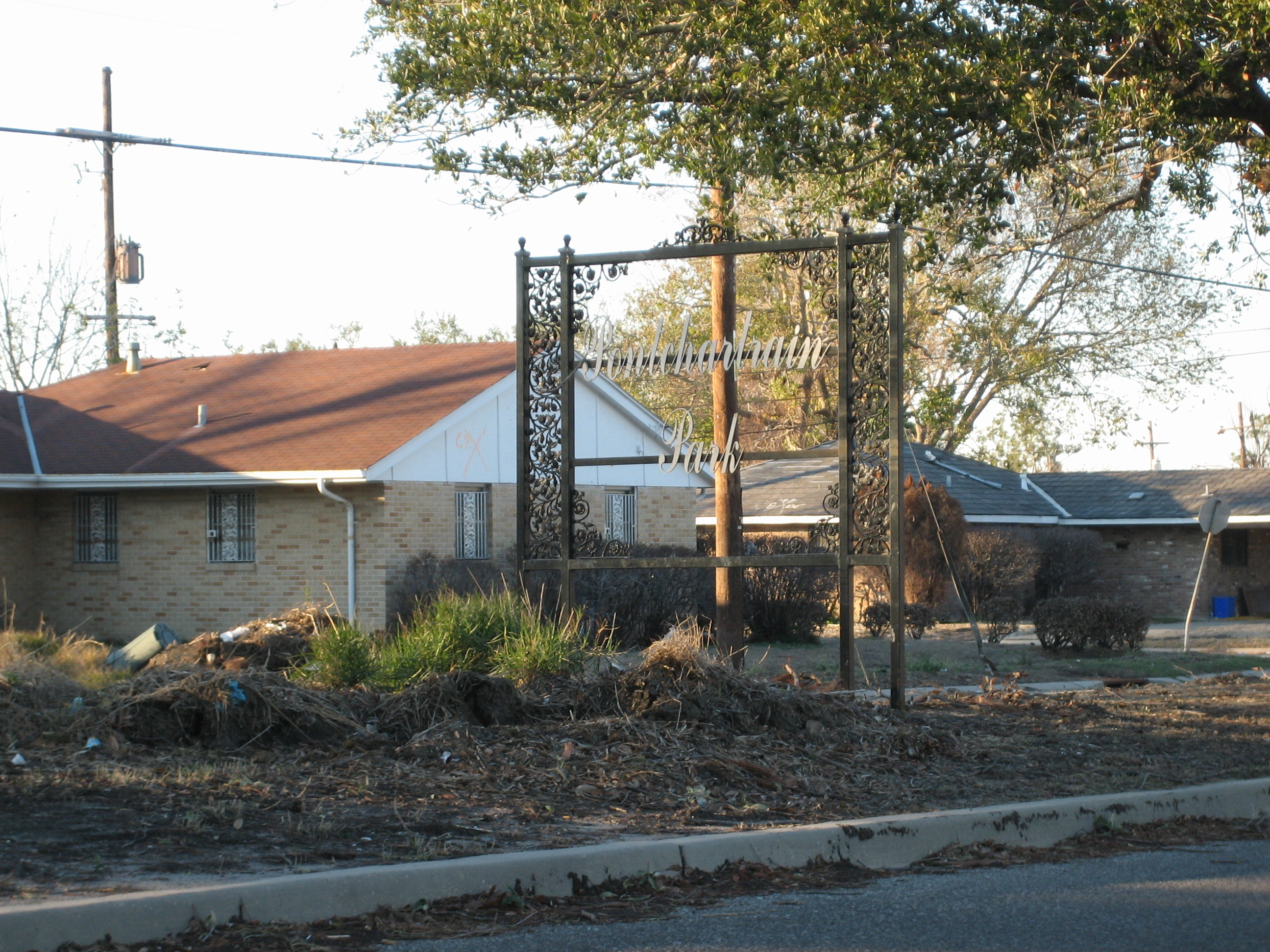
- Interactive map of Pontchartrain Park
- Coordinates: 30°01′19″N 90°02′25″W
- Country: United States
- State: Louisiana
- City: New Orleans
- Planning District: District 6, Gentilly District

Area
  - Total: 1.00 sq mi (2.6 km^{2})
  - Land: 0.93 sq mi (2.4 km^{2})
  - Water: 0.07 sq mi (0.18 km^{2})
- Elevation: 0 ft (0 m)

Population (2010)
  - Total: 1,482
  - Density: 1,600/sq mi (620/km^{2})
- Time zone: UTC-6 (CST)
  - Summer (DST): UTC-5 (CDT)
- Area code: 504

Pontchartrain Park is a historically registered neighborhood of the city of New Orleans. A subdistrict of the Gentilly District Area, its boundaries as defined by the City Planning Commission are: Leon C. Simon Drive to the north, the Industrial Canal to the east, Dreux Avenue to the south and Peoples Avenue to the west.

== Geography ==
Pontchartrain Park is located at 30°01′19″N 90°02′25″W and has an elevation of 0 feet (0.0 m). According to the United States Census Bureau, the district has a total area of 1.00 square mile (2.6 km^{2}). 0.93 square miles (2.4 km^{2}) of which is land and 0.07 square miles (0.2 km^{2}) (7.0%) of which is water.

Pontchartrain Park includes a senior center, a golf course designed by famed African American golf course designer Joseph Bartholomew and the Major League Baseball Urban Youth Academy located at Wesley Barrow Stadium. Adjacent to the Pontchartrain Park golf course is the campus of Southern University at New Orleans.

=== Adjacent Neighborhoods ===
- Gentilly Woods (south)
- Lake Terrace/Lake Oaks (north)
- Milneburg (west)
- Pines Village (east)

=== Boundaries ===
The City Planning Commission defines the boundaries of Pontchartrain Park as these streets: Leon C. Simon Drive, the Industrial Canal, Dreux Avenue and Peoples Avenue.

== Demographics ==
As of the census of 2000, there were 2,630 people, 1,009 households, and 736 families residing in the neighborhood. The population density was 2,828 /mi^{2} (1,096 /km^{2}). As of the census of 2010, there were 1,482 people, 551 households, and 385 families residing in the neighborhood.

== History ==
Pontchartrain Park was developed after World War II. It was one of the first suburban-style subdivisions developed by and for middle class African Americans during the Jim Crow era of racial segregation in Louisiana. Its development was originally envisioned and funded by local philanthropists Edith and Edgar Stern and Rosa and Charles Keller. It has been home to such prominent New Orleanians as mayors Dutch Morial and Marc Morial, political activist Philip M. Baptiste and district attorney Eddie Jordan; as well as nationally known figures such as Lisa P. Jackson, EPA Administrator under President Barack Obama, actor Wendell Pierce, and jazz musician Terrence Blanchard.

In the 1970s, urban renewal projects were undertaken with funding from the federal New Town Program. Pontchartrain Park flooded badly in the aftermath of Hurricane Katrina in 2005, taking on water first from the overtopping of a section of floodwall of the Industrial Canal caused by storm surge channeled into the city from the MRGO Canal, then from major breaches sustained by floodwalls along the London Avenue Canal.

In July 2020, the Pontchartrain Park Historic District was announced, as the neighborhood was added to the U.S. National Park Service's National Register of Historic Places. A commemorative marker was unveiled on June 30, 2022.

== Notable residents ==
- Terrence Blanchard
- Lisa P. Jackson
- Eddie Jordan
- Dutch Morial
- Marc Morial
- Wendell Pierce
- Darryl Willis
- Gustave Blache III

== See also ==
- New Orleans neighborhoods
- Gentilly, New Orleans
