= Michoud, New Orleans =

Unincorporated community in Louisiana

Michoud, Louisiana
- Unincorporated community
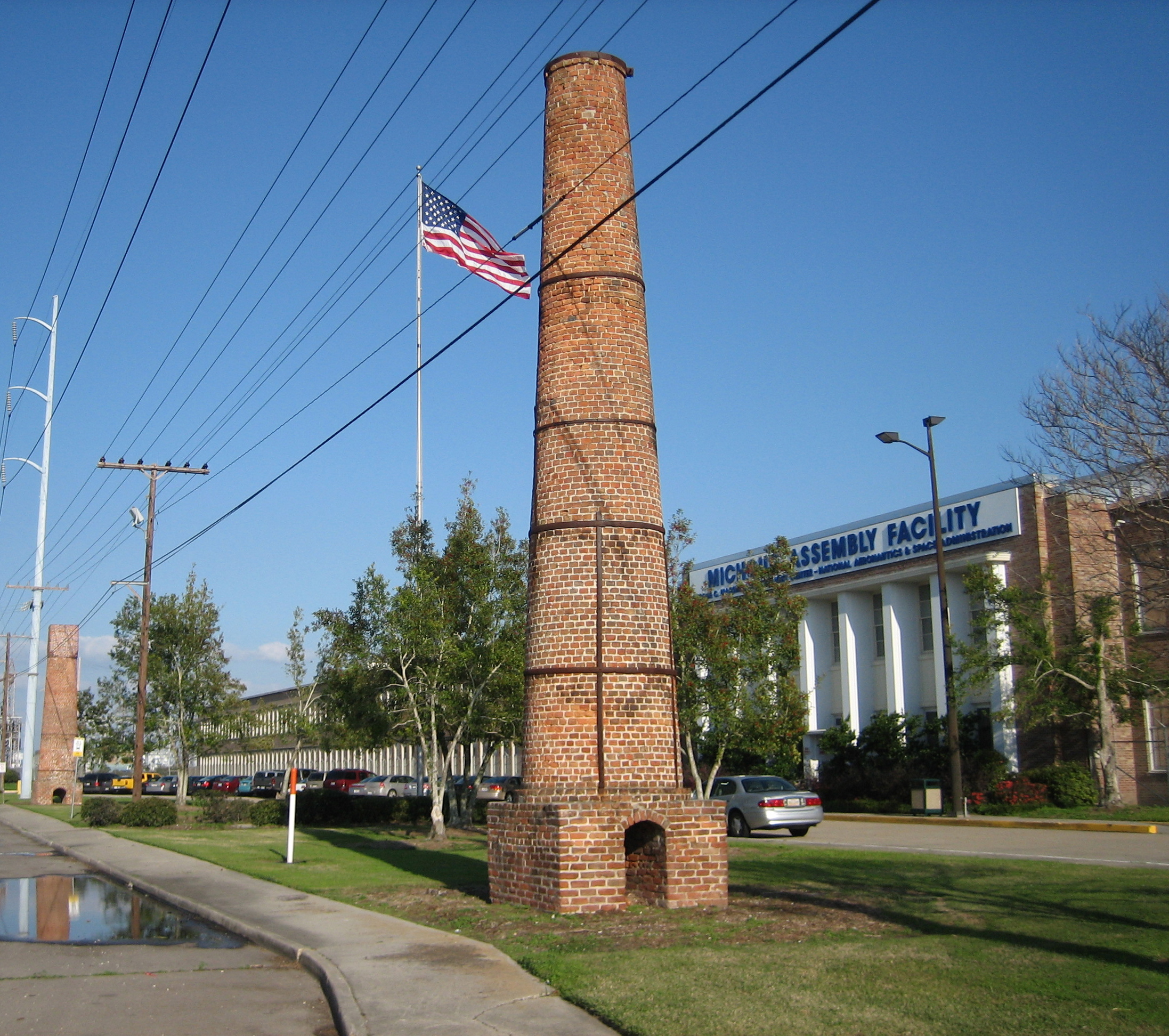
- Old plantation smokestacks stand outside the administration offices of NASA's Michoud Assembly Facility, c.2006.

- Location within Louisiana Location within the United States
- Coordinates: 30°01′49″N 89°55′33″W
- Country: United States
- State: Louisiana
- Parish: Orleans

Area
  - Total: 349.85 sq mi (906.10 km^{2})
  - Land: 169.50 sq mi (439.00 km^{2})
  - Water: 180.35 sq mi (467.10 km^{2})
- Elevation: −3 ft (−0.91 m)

Population (2020)
  - Total: 383,997
  - Density: 2,265.5/sq mi (874.71/km^{2})
- Time zone: UTC-6 (Central (CST))
  - Summer (DST): UTC-5 (CDT)
- Postal code: 70129
- Area code: 504
- GNIS feature ID: 543467
- FIPS code: 22-55000

Michoud (pronounced /ˈmiʃu/ MEE-shoo or sometimes /ˈmiʃud/ MEE-shood) is an area in Eastern New Orleans, part of the Ninth Ward of New Orleans, Louisiana, located at latitude 30.03°N, longitude −89.925°W.

== Demographics ==
Historical population
Census	Pop.	Note	%±
2020	383,997		—
U.S. Decennial Census

== History ==
In the 19th century, Michoud was a small rural village in Orleans Parish outside of the city limits on Gentilly Road, named after French sugar farmer Antoine Michoud. The original tract of land, located in eastern New Orleans, was part of a 34,500 acre French Royal land grant to local merchant, Gilbert Antoine de St. Maxent. In 1827, the land was acquired by Antoine Michoud, the son of Napoleon's Administrator of Domains, who moved to the city in 1827. Michoud operated a sugar cane plantation and refinery on the site until his death in 1863. His descendants continued operating the refinery and kept the original St. Maxent estate intact into the 20th century. Two brick smokestack blast furnaces from the original refinery still stand before the Michoud facility today.

After the construction of the Gulf Intracoastal Waterway some industrial development of the area began, growing with military plants during World War II, most importantly Higgins Industries factories. A small military airfield was built in the 1940s and 1950s. During that time, architect Andrew J. Higgins was contracted by the U.S. Government to construct a new aircraft manufacturing facility adjacent to the airfield, at a cost of $180 million ($2.8 billion in 2018). By the 1960s, the Michoud airfield runway was mostly removed (with portions rebuilt as Saturn Boulevard with only a small section of runway visible at southwest end), except the manufacturing buildings. NASA acquired the factory for the moon program; it is now known as the NASA Michoud Assembly Facility complex.

This area has the distinction of being the fastest-sinking part of Louisiana and one of the fastest-sinking areas of the Gulf Region. It is also among the lowest areas in the city in terms of elevation.

== See also ==
- Michoud fault
- TACA Flight 110
