= Lincoln Beach (amusement park) =

Former amusement park in New Orleans, Louisiana, United States

- Interactive map of Lincoln Beach
- Location: New Orleans, Louisiana, U.S.
- Coordinates: 30.069688°N 89.953076°W
- Status: Defunct
- Opened: 1939
- Closed: 1965

Lincoln Beach was an amusement park in New Orleans, Louisiana, functioning from 1939 through 1965. The park was for the area's black population during the Jim Crow era of racial segregation.

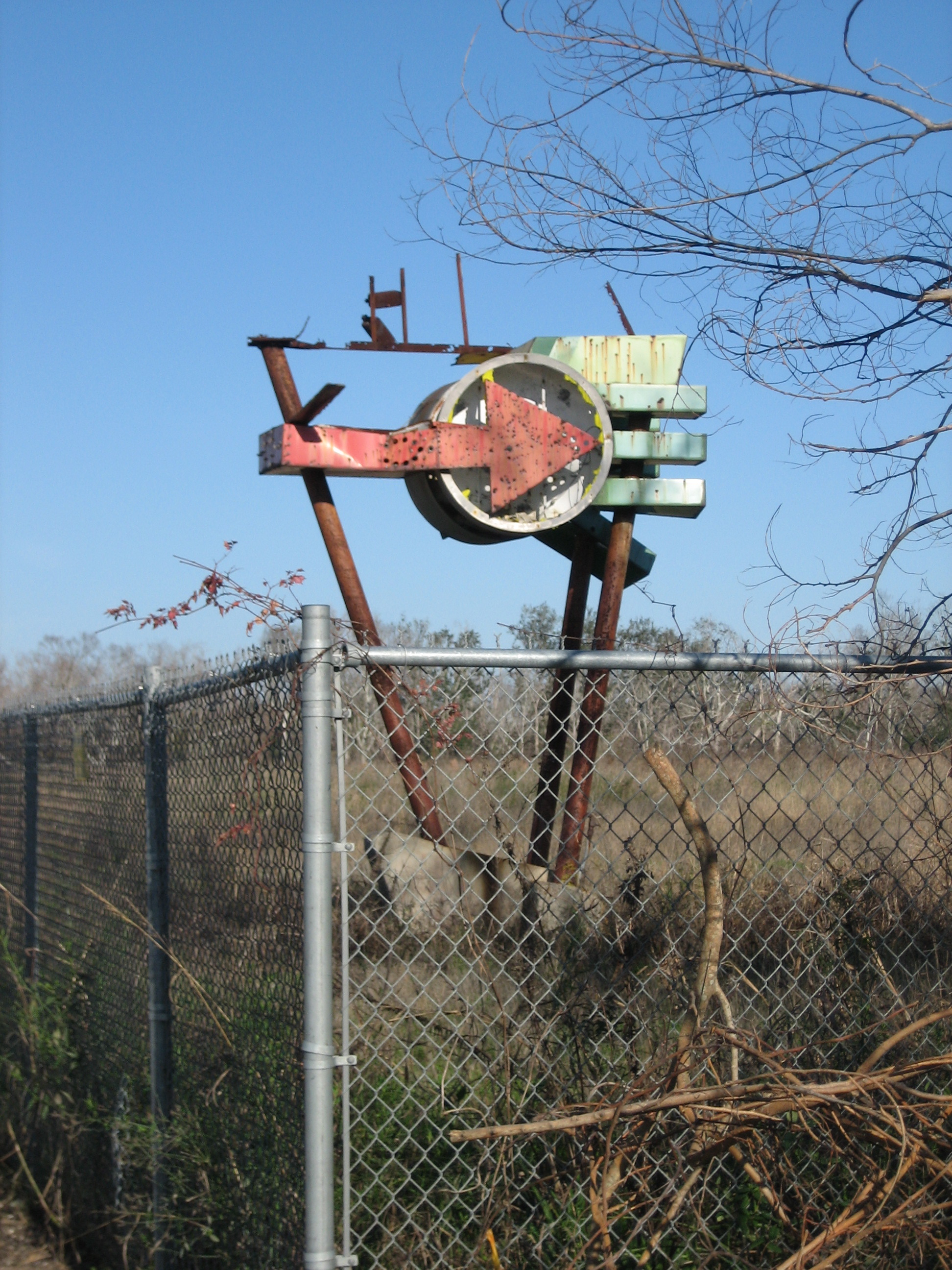
This slowly decaying Deco sign on Hayne Boulevard is one of the few reminders of the long closed amusement park

Lincoln Beach was located along the shore of Lake Pontchartrain near Little Woods, in a portion of the Eastern New Orleans section of the Ninth Ward of New Orleans that was little developed in the 1930s. The land where Lincoln Beach was located was deeded to the city by Sam Zemurray in 1938 and purchased within a year by the Orleans Levee Board. The Levee Board first designated this section as a swimming area in the lake for "colored" New Orleanians, then built out additional land in the lake for the amusement park to be built on. The park was similar to the then "whites only" Pontchartrain Beach amusement park, only on a smaller scale. It featured various rides, games, restaurants, a swimming pool in addition to lake swimming, and frequent live music performances. In the last decade, Fats Domino, Nat King Cole, The Neville Brothers, and more performed there.

Pontchartrain Beach was desegregated in 1964 and the city stopped taking care of Lincoln Beach and it soon fell into disrepair and closed in 1965.

Although there have been various proposals to redevelop the Lincoln Beach site, the decaying ruins of the park have remained vacant for decades. The history of Lincoln Beach is recounted in the book, The Land Was Ours: African American Beaches from Jim Crow to the Sunbelt South (published by Harvard University Press, 2012).

In 2020, Reggie Ford, a New Orleans artist, began cleaning up the beach. Others, like Sage Michael, have joined the clean-up effort. The beach is currently clean and being used by the community with several hundred visitors on the average weekend. New Orleans Mayor LaToya Cantrell started her own assessment of the usability of the beach and has stated she finds the beach to be unsafe in its current state. Councilmember Oliver Thomas is supporting the project. After a series of community led initiatives, various design iterations and political setbacks, the beach has been awarded funding and is slated to re-open to the public in early 2027. This will be the first publicly accessible shore access to Lake Ponchartrain on the New Orleans banks in over four decades.
