= Lake Forest Plaza =

Former shopping mall in New Orleans, Louisiana

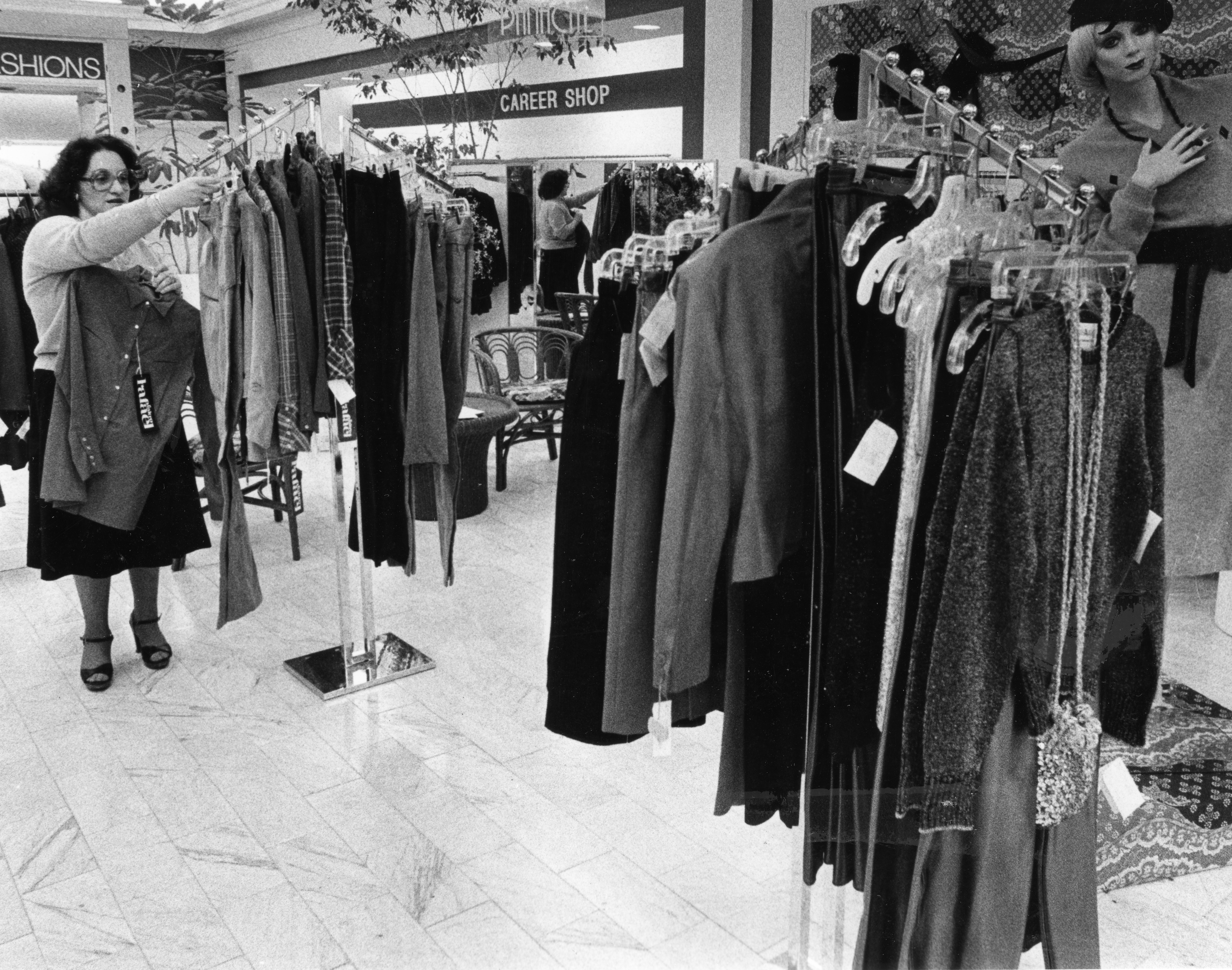
- Interior of Gus Mayer Department Store, 1979
- Location: New Orleans, Louisiana, U.S.
- Coordinates: 30°01′59″N 89°58′39″W
- Opened: September 19, 1974; 52 years ago
- Closed: 2005
- Developer: Sizeler Realty
- Floor area: 1,200,000 sq ft (110,000 m^{2})

Lake Forest Plaza was a shopping mall in New Orleans East, Louisiana, United States that opened in 1974. It had been closed before being flooded during Hurricane Katrina in 2005, and the ruins were demolished in 2007.

== Features ==
The plaza was once the largest shopping mall in the state of Louisiana with approximately 1,200,000 sq ft (110,000 m^{2}) of retail space. Original anchors were D.H. Holmes, Maison Blanche (each 3 levels), and Sears (2 levels). A two level Mervyns was later added near the cinemas. The Maison Blanche and Sears stores relocated from the Gentilly Woods Shopping Center in the Gentilly section of New Orleans. The plaza also spawned the development of several smaller strip malls, and larger big box stores nearby.

== History ==
The opening of the Lake Forest Plaza was accompanied by much fanfare, with celebrities making public appearances. At its peak it accounted for a full 25% of all sales taxes collected in Orleans Parish. It was one of the first shopping/dining/entertainment centers ever developed. The cloverleaf design of the mall was centered around the first ice skating rink in the state, as well as the first "food court". As well as the food court outlets (Taco Loco, Flame-N-Burger, Hook Line & Sinker, Orange Julius, Karmelkorn, Baskin Robbins, Corn Dog 7, China Express, Great American Cookie Co., etc.), there were several sit-down restaurants. The mall itself was divided into four sections which ran from anchor to anchor. Each section was individually named: Santa Rosa Mall, Santa Ana Mall, Santa Maria Mall, and Santa Clara Mall, each section written out in tiles on the floors of each wing. The center of the mall where the ice rink and food court stood was the Fiesta Plaza Mall. The decor was entirely brown-tiled floors, tiled walls, wood benches, real live trees, and tons of skylights. Storefronts had stylish signage hung vertically in the corridors. While the mall was enormous, each corridor was cozy and manageable, the unique cloverleaf design kept it in perspective.

Original stores included the first Gap store in the area, Leonard Krower, Godchaux’s, Morrisons Cafeteria, Sizzler Steakhouse, the first ever Chick-Fil-A in the state, Swiss Colony, Shoe Lodge, Dannys, The Ranch, the ever-popular Farrells Ice Cream Parlor Restaurant, Gordons, Florsheim, National Shirts, GNC (also a first), Bakers, 5-7-9, Merry Go Round, Imperial Shoes, Porter Stevens, Rubenstein Brothers, All American Jeans, Spencers, Limited, Hickory Farms, Hibernia Bank, Bank of New Orleans, a huge McDonald's, Space Port, Wicks 'N' Sticks, Tinder Box, Walgreens (with a cafeteria), Hausmann's, B. Dalton, Collage, Brentano's (outlet of the famous New York City store), Gryders Shoes, Ponsetis Shoes, Oshmans, Fiesta Mexican Restaurant, Lerners, Kay Bee Toys, Vision Plaza, Halpern's Fabrics, Flagg Brother's Shoes, etc.

== Decline ==
The mall thrived until about the late 1980s when the economic downturn of southern Louisiana after the "oil bust" took an especially heavy toll on New Orleans East. Through the 1990s, as the neighborhoods around it deteriorated and became unsafe, the mall felt the repercussions. Originally New Orleans East was an upper/middle-class neighborhood with many well-heeled subdivisions and several large upscale apartment complexes. When the economy hit the skids in the 1980s with the loss of the oil business, New Orleans East became less affluent. Many residents fled to the North Shore/Slidell area, which wound up with its own mall, (North Shore Square), which had many of the same anchors and mall stores as Lake Forest. Sears was the first large anchor to close at the Plaza. Despite a major renovation in the late 1980s which replaced the by now drab earth tone tiling to a generic white/aqua color scheme, as well as removed the ice rink, it was too late to save Lake Forest. White flight to Jefferson Parish bolstered Lake Forest's competitor Lakeside Shopping Center in Metairie in the battle for wealthier patrons, although New Orleans East (where Lake Forest was located) had a sizable black middle class population at the time.

Just prior to Katrina, the mall was left with only one large anchor in the former Maison Blanche building, which became a Dillard's when they bought out the MB stores. Earlier on, when Dillard's bought out the Holmes stores, they shuttered the Lake Forest Plaza location rather than converting it. The cinemas closed when Gulf States Theatres decided to concentrate on the East Lake Cinema 8, located across the interstate from the plaza. In quick succession many of the national retailers closed also. Eventually they were replaced by independent stores catering to an urban clientele. Entire corridors of the mall were boarded up with sheetrock, which dramatically decreased the square footage accessible to the public. It seemed as if practically overnight the plaza became a "dead mall".

In 2005, the Federal levee failure during Hurricane Katrina destroyed most of what remained of the mall. The ruins would later be demolished.

The mall was originally developed and managed by Sizeler Realty. Later it was sold a few times, eventually landing in the hands of Gowri Kailas in July 1999. The Grand Theatre was added in the early 2000s as an out parcel in a last-ditch effort to bring life back to the Plaza. As of 2019, the Grand Theatre was demolished. The rest of the complex has been demolished and is being replaced by a Lowe's. The rest of the site is to be redeveloped into a new "town center" type of development with free standing stores, garages, hotels, apartments and condos.
