= Paris Road Bridge =

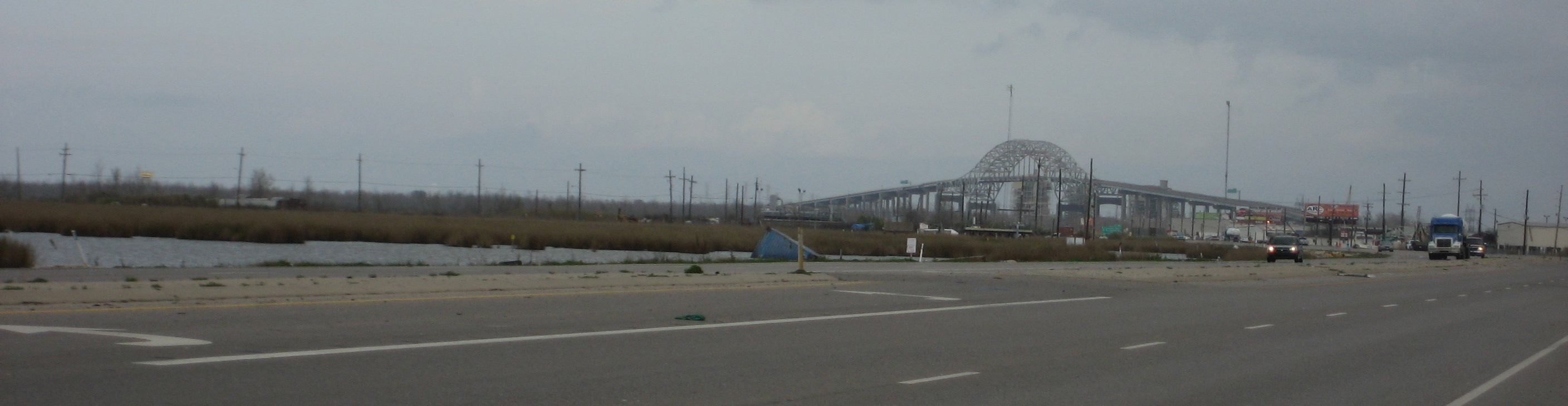
- Coordinates: 30°00′18″N 89°56′20″W
- Carries: 4 lanes of LA 47
- Crosses: Mississippi River Gulf Outlet
- Locale: New Orleans, Louisiana, U.S.
- Other name: Green Bridge
- Maintained by: Louisiana Department of Transportation and Development

Characteristics
- Design: Steel through arch
- Material: Concrete, steel
- Total length: 6,642 feet (2,024 m)
- Longest span: 702 feet (214 m)
- No. of spans: 3
- Piers in water: 2
- Clearance below: 135 feet (41 m)

History
- Designer: United States Army Corps of Engineers
- Constructed by: Foster and Creighton Company
- Construction start: June 1964
- Construction end: November 14, 1967
- Construction cost: $12,250,000
- Opened: July 21, 1967
- Replaces: Paris Road pontoon bridge

Location
- Interactive map of Paris Road Bridge

The Paris Road Bridge is the name of the bridge carrying Louisiana Highway 47 across the Mississippi River Gulf Outlet between St. Bernard Parish and New Orleans East in Louisiana, United States. It is also known as the Green Bridge. The name "Green Bridge" came from it originally being painted green. It was repainted brown in 1980, and recently repainted grey, but locals continue to call it "the Green Bridge".

The bridge was built by the Army Corps of Engineers and opened to traffic on July 21, 1967, with the bridge being completed on November 14 of that year.

Interstate 510 ends just north of the bridge. Both ends of the bridge are in Orleans Parish, but Chalmette is a short distance south of the bridge, which provides the most important road link for St. Bernard Parish, and is one of only four routes into the parish, the others being Judge Perez Drive, the Chalmette Ferry, and the St. Bernard Highway.

== Gallery ==
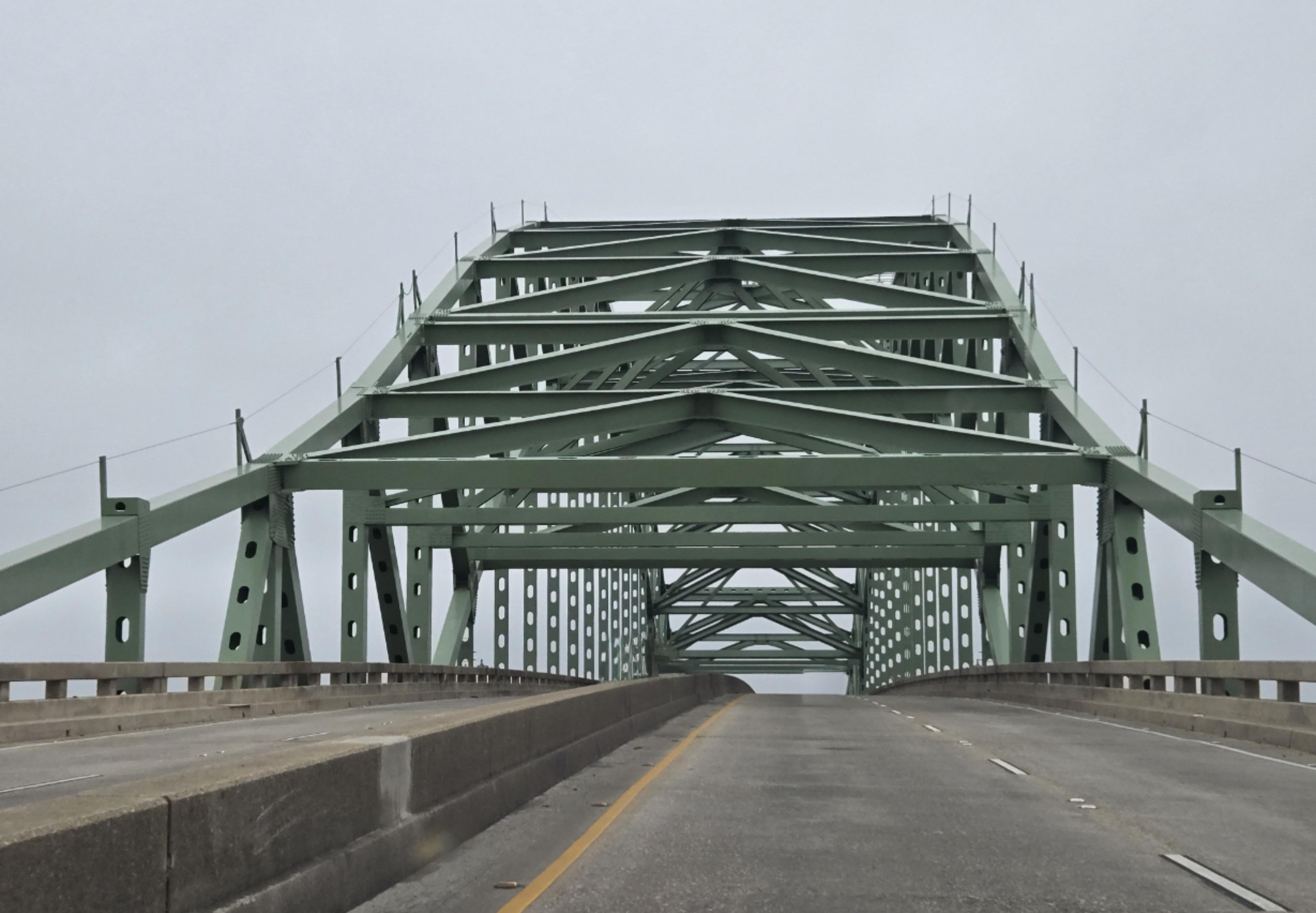
Paris Road Bridge, Main Span

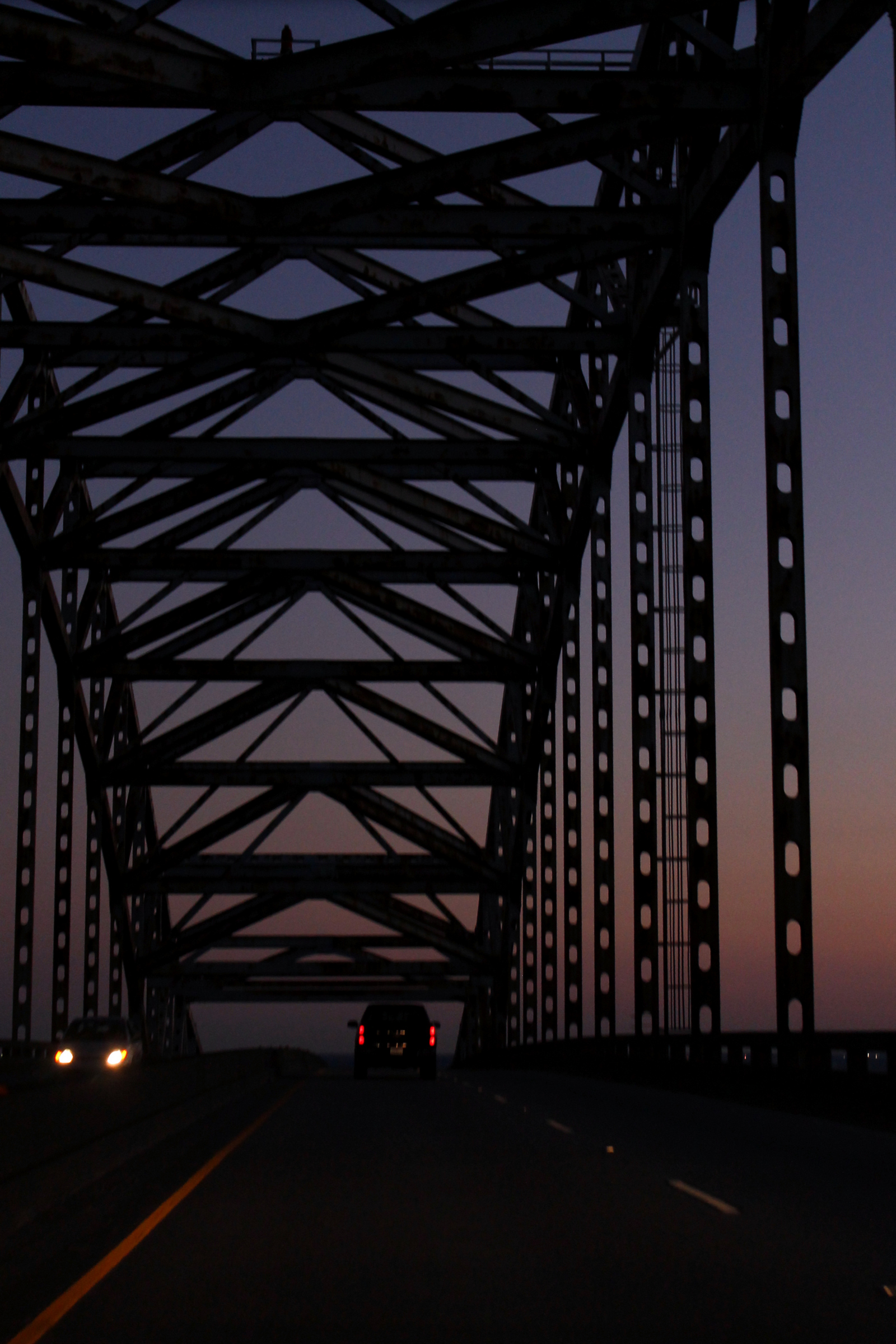
Paris Road Bridge at night

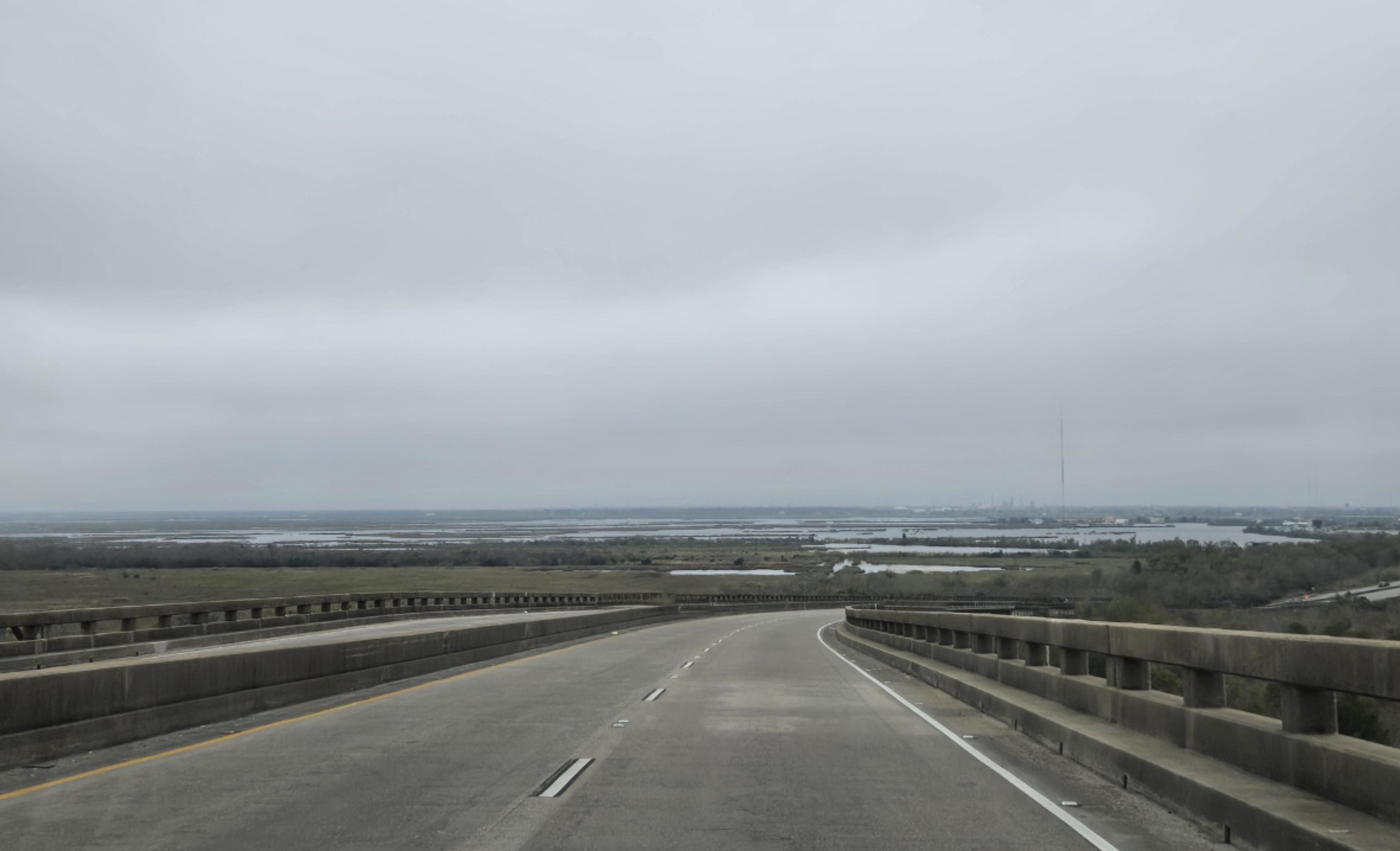
Paris Road Bridge, view towards Chalmette
