= Gentilly Woods, New Orleans =

Gentilly Woods
- New Orleans Neighborhood
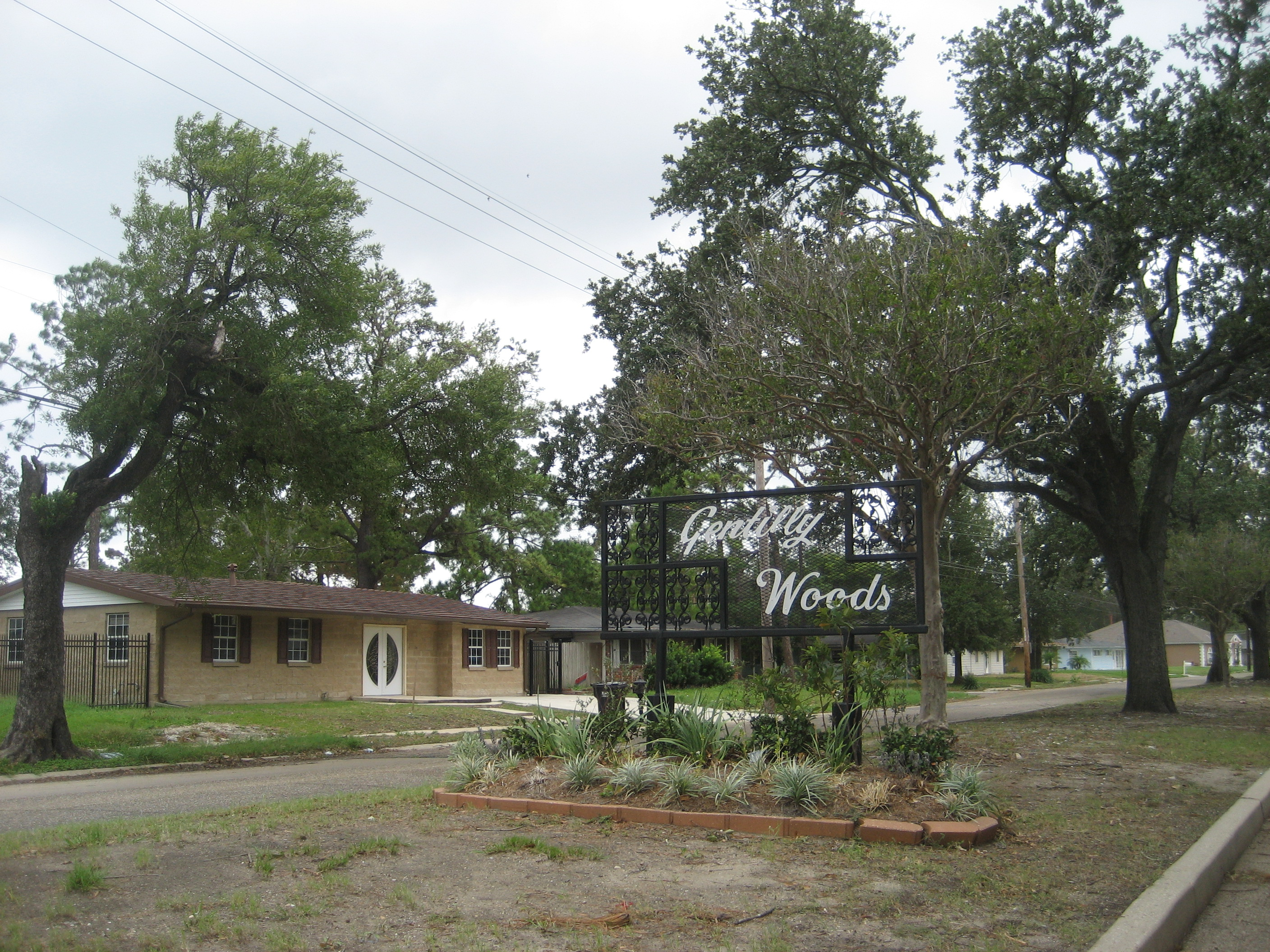
- Interactive map of Gentilly Woods
- Coordinates: 30°00′36″N 90°02′17″W
- Country: United States
- State: Louisiana
- City: New Orleans
- Planning District: District 6, Gentilly District

Area
  - Total: 0.72 sq mi (1.9 km^{2})
  - Land: 0.70 sq mi (1.8 km^{2})
  - Water: 0.02 sq mi (0.052 km^{2})
- Elevation: 0 ft (0 m)

Population (2010)
  - Total: 979
  - Density: 1,400/sq mi (540/km^{2})
- Time zone: UTC-6 (CST)
  - Summer (DST): UTC-5 (CDT)
- Area code: 504

Gentilly Woods is a neighborhood of the city of New Orleans. A subdistrict of the Gentilly District Area, its boundaries as defined by the City Planning Commission are: Dreux Avenue to the north, Industrial Canal to the east, Gentilly Boulevard to the south and People's Avenue to the west.

== Geography ==
Gentilly Woods is located at 30°00′36″N 90°02′17″W and has an elevation of 0 feet (0.0 m). According to the United States Census Bureau, the district has a total area of 0.72 square miles (1.9 km^{2}). 0.70 square miles (1.8 km^{2}) of which is land and 0.02 square miles (0.1 km^{2}) (2.78%) of which is water.

=== Adjacent Neighborhoods ===
- Pontchartrain Park (north)
- Pines Village (east)
- Desire Area (south)
- Gentilly Terrace (west)

=== Boundaries ===
The City Planning Commission defines the boundaries of Gentilly Woods as these streets: Dreux Avenue, Industrial Canal, Gentilly Boulevard and People's Avenue.

== Demographics ==
As of the census of 2000, there were 4,387 people, 1,487 households, and 1,147 families residing in the neighborhood. The population density was 6,267 /mi^{2} (2,437 /km^{2}).

As of the census of 2010, there were 2,817 people, 999 households, and 715 families residing in the neighborhood.

== History ==
The Gentilly Woods subdivision was developed in the early 1950s, in an area adjacent to the Higgins Shipyards, which was located on the Industrial Canal.

During World War II, the Higgins plant occupied most of the land. At the factory there were homes constructed of plywood that employees were reported to have occupied during the war effort, they were aptly named Higgins Huts.

With the growth of the city after the war and the need for new housing, Gentilly Woods was developed. A corporation founded by W.H. Crawford and Associates began work, in early 1951, with a plan to construct more than 1400 homes designed to meet the booming post-war housing market.

The City of New Orleans made arrangements for public transportation and the developers signed contracts for city sewerage, drainage, water mains, and other site improvements before a single house was begun. Land was secured along Gentilly Boulevard for a shopping center, to serve the new community, and approximately 12 acres (49,000 m^{2}) were reserved for school (Saint Gabriel the Archangel and W.C.C. Claiborne grammar schools) and playground use.

== See also ==
- Neighborhoods in New Orleans
- Gentilly, New Orleans
