= Vietnamese in New Orleans =

Vietnamese population in New Orleans

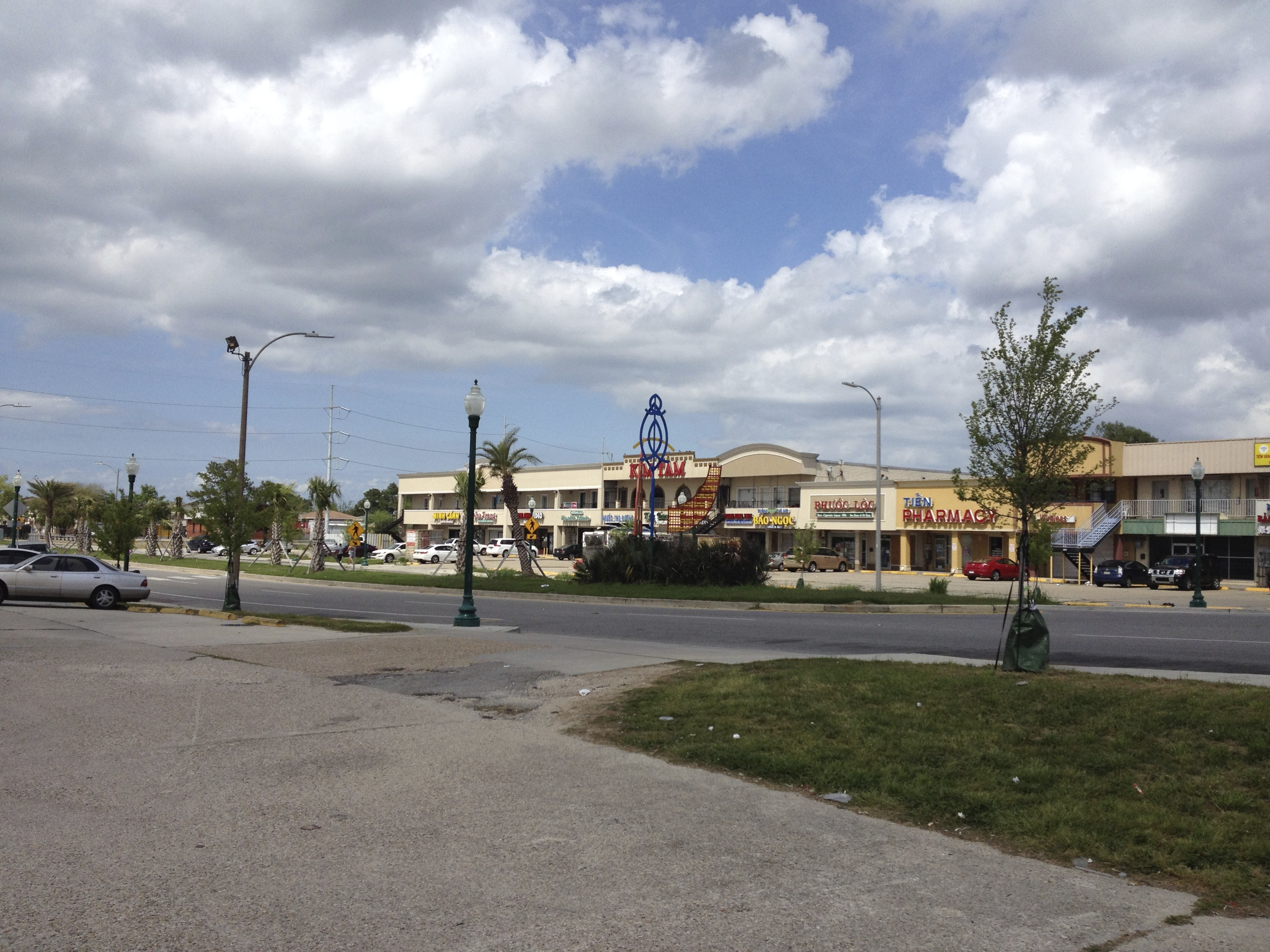
Vietnamese shops in New Orleans East's "Versailles"

As of 2012 Greater New Orleans has over 14,000 Vietnamese Americans and other people of Vietnamese origins.

== History ==
Large waves of Vietnamese arrived in New Orleans beginning around 1975 after the Fall of Saigon. One reason why many Vietnamese settled in New Orleans was because of the climate similar to that of Vietnam, and Vietnam was a country colonized by France, not unlike Louisiana itself. In addition, many Vietnamese fleeing were Catholic, and Catholic Charities brought them specifically to New Orleans. The first groups settled in Section 8 properties in the Versailles area of New Orleans East. The first 200 families trickled into New Orleans, half going to the Versailles Apartments in New Orleans East and the other half going to Kingstown Marrero Apartments. Both New Orleans East and the Westbank were settled by the Vietnamese at the same time. In later periods, Vietnamese settlements spread to other parts of the metropolitan New Orleans area including other sections of New Orleans East, Avondale, and the City of Gretna.

The New Orleans East section was flooded by Hurricane Katrina in 2005. Sara Roahen, the author of Gumbo Tales: Finding My Place at the New Orleans Table, wrote that the Vietnamese had been accustomed to hardship and therefore were not as devastated by the effects of the storm, and that of the groups in the flooded zones the Vietnamese had "rallied" the fastest.

== Organizations ==
Vietnamese American Young Leaders Association of New Orleans (VAYLA-NO) is an area organization for youth.

Vietnamese shrimpers who reside in Plaquemines Parish participate in an annual "Blessing of the Fleet" at the start of brown shrimp season in May.

== Media ==
=== Radio ===
WVDL-LP, 95.1 FM, is owned by the New Orleans Vietnamese American Young Leaders Association and offers variety based programming. It is located at 4646 Michoud Boulevard in New Orleans, Louisiana 70129.

=== Television ===
S. Leo Chiang directed the 2009 television documentary A Village Called Versailles, co-produced by the Independent Television Service and Walking Iris Films. The project was in cooperation with the Center for Asian American Media. The film discusses Vietnamese-American life in New Orleans.

== Religion ==
Many Vietnamese living in Versailles are Roman Catholics. Mary Queen of Vietnam, a Vietnamese Catholic church, is in the center of the community.

== Cuisine ==
Thomas Beller of T+L Magazine stated that the use of baguettes and influences from France are the similarities between the cuisine of New Orleans and Vietnamese cuisine.

Vietnamese restaurants opened in Vietnamese communities in New Orleans East and the West Bank after 1975. After the first immigrant generation arrived, many opened seafood and Chinese American restaurants out of the belief that they were more likely to succeed compared to Vietnamese restaurants. By 2014 Vietnamese restaurants had opened outside of Vietnamese communities, such as in the East Bank of New Orleans. The owners of these newer restaurants were born and/or raised in the United States.

In New Orleans banh mi are called "Vietnamese poboys". Crystal hot sauce is served with pho in New Orleans restaurants. Crawfish is a common element with both the native New Orleans cuisine and the Vietnamese cuisine. Elizabeth M. Williams, author of New Orleans: A Food Biography, wrote that "there is little need for Asian Cajun restaurants" due to the fact that "spicy crawfish boils are so easy to find in New Orleans".

Williams wrote that many Vietnamese easily learned how to make king cakes since baguettes are a part of Vietnamese cuisine. Many New Orleans-area restaurants have two soups of the day, with one being a gumbo and the other being a pho. The pickled vegetables seen in banh mi are now available as fillings for po boys in traditional po boy restaurants. Many New Orleans restaurants also have chayote (mirliton) spring rolls.

As of 2008 many Vietnamese in Village de l'Est grow vegetables in gardens. Other popular crops include mangoes, mint, taro, squash, and bananas.

== Recreation ==
The Vietnamese New Year (Tet) is celebrated in New Orleans East.

== Notable residents ==
- Joseph Cao (politician)
- Hong Chau (actress)
