= Darryl Willis =

American energy industry executive

- Born: 1969 (age 56–57); New Orleans, Louisiana, US
- Occupation: Microsoft Corporate Vice President Energy Industry

Darryl Keith Willis (born c. 1969) is an American geologist and publicist, currently working as Corporate Vice President Energy Industry at Microsoft. He previously worked as Vice President of Oil, Gas and Energy for Google and as President and General Manager of BP Angola.

== Deepwater Horizon response ==
Willis gained national attention in 2010 when the Louisiana native volunteered to lead the company's claims efforts following the Deepwater Horizon oil spill. Willis was vice president for resources at BP at the time and appeared in many public relations advertisements clad in an orange polo shirt. He was also featured in CNN's The Situation Room and testified before Congress about the incident and response.

Willis, a geologist by profession, said he was tapped for the volunteering after hearing BP executives discuss the plan. "Folks were talking about paying claims in 30 to 60 days...And I knew, being from Louisiana, that that was going to be about 30 days too long, and we needed to get people's claims paid as quickly as possible."

Willis grew up in Pontchartrain Park, New Orleans, and graduated from McDonogh No. 35 Senior High School.

Willis said he was surprised by his high-profile position. "I actually took over this role assuming I would be tucked away in some office making sure systems and processes were working," he said.

== Personal life ==
Willis graduated from Louisiana Scholars' College at Northwestern State University in 1991, and then earned a Master of Science in Geology and Geophysics from the University of New Orleans in 1993, as well as a Master's in Global Management and Public Policy from Stanford in 2007.

Willis married his wife, Dawnia Tyrese Richard Willis, on September 10, 2005, on Martha's Vineyard days after his mother, Cora Hambrick Willis, lost her house in Hurricane Katrina.
