= Michoud fault =

Geological fault that runs through eastern New Orleans

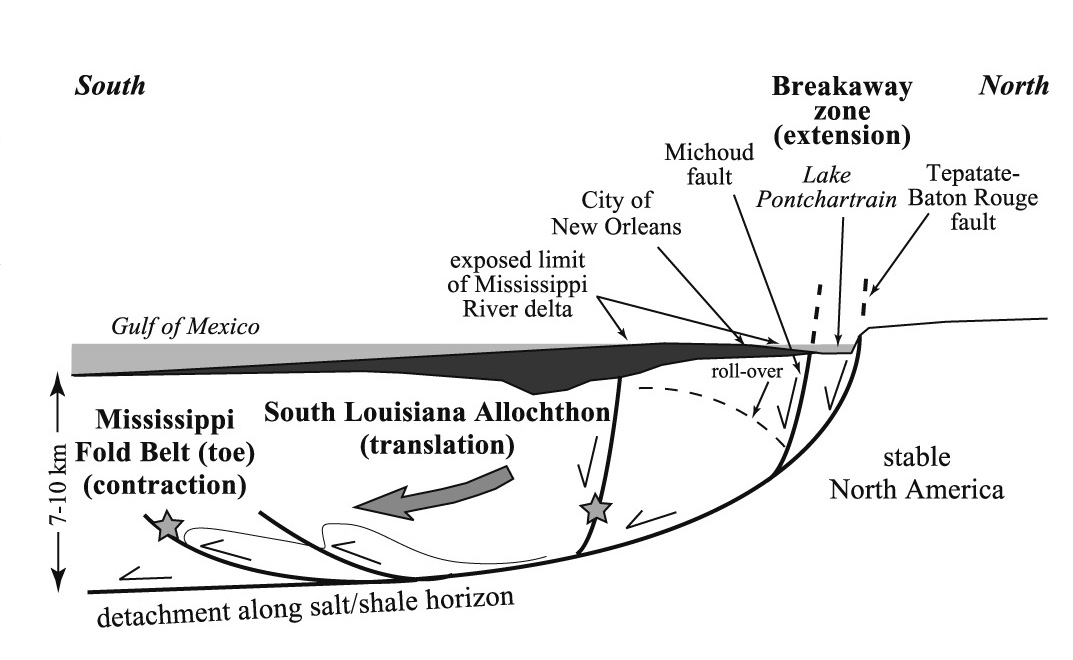

The Michoud fault is a geological fault that runs through eastern New Orleans. The Michoud fault is the subject of extensive scientific inquiry into why Louisiana is losing vast tracts of land.

Subsurface mapping identified the Michoud fault, on the basis of well cutoffs and seismic surveys. Sedimentary growth implies that movement along the Michoud fault has been intermittent since Oligocene time (Bebout and Gutierrez, 1983). A cross section in McBride (1998) shows a high-angle normal fault that was correlated by Dokka (2006) with the Michoud fault. This fault merges with a low-angle detachment fault at –7 km deep that developed along the top of a slightly south-dipping zone of weak salt and shale. These structures are considered to be related to a regional south-vergent extensional-contractional complex described by Peel et al. (1995; Fig. 1). Movement of the complex and thus on the Michaud fault reflects gravitational instabilities and down-dip motion during times of high sedimentation (Peel et al., 1995).

The Michoud fault belongs to a class of geologic structures known as growth faults (Mauduit, T., Brun, J. P. 1998). Growth faults are common geologic structures of regions undergoing high sedimentation rates, such as river deltas and passive margins. They often develop where weak rock layers (detachments) such as salt, anhydrite, or shale underlie regions of rapid sedimentation. These weak zones allow the growing mass of material above them to slide downhill, either continuously or episodically. These downslope movements will be correspondingly experienced in the headwall region (such as that occupied by the Michoud fault) either as slow (barely perceptible) or rapid (catastrophic) subsidence. Growth faults are also sometimes called "listric faults", implying that the fault is a concave-upward surface that transforms nearly vertical displacements at the surface into nearly horizontal ones at depth.

The Michoud fault is not unexpected or unusual as a geologic feature of the Mississippi River Delta. Holocene faulting and tilting is widely recognized in many world deltas, such as the Nile, the Ganges-Brahmaputra, the Yangtze, the Po River, and the Rhine.
