= Wicks 'N' Sticks =

Home decor store chain

- Industry: Candles
- Founded: 1968
- Defunct: 2006 (as a company)
- Fate: Bankruptcy
- Headquarters: Houston, Texas

Wicks 'N' Sticks, often written as Wicks n' Sticks, was a chain of mall-based candle and later home decor stores in the United States.

== History ==
Wicks 'N' Sticks began in Houston in 1968, and by 1971 had grown to 18 locations in 11 states. The store offered a range of 23 different scented candles, hand-carved candles from Germany, and hand-carved wooden candle holders from Spain. By 1988, the chain had grown to a total of 305 stores, a large number of them franchised. By the 1990s, the chain's product range had greatly expanded, due to the company only requiring a third of products to be purchased from them, allowing the franchisee to stock the other two-thirds with products including Christmas ornaments, porcelain items, collectibles, calendars, and more. In 2006, the company filed for Chapter 11 bankruptcy, citing new competition from other stores and foreign imports. While a majority of stores closed at this time, some independent franchises continued including locations at Rhode Island's Warwick Mall, which closed in 2012, and at Florida's Volusia Mall, which closed in 2016.

== See also ==
- Yankee Candle
- Bath & Body Works
