= Little Woods, Louisiana =

Unincorporated community in Louisiana

- Unincorporated community
- Nickname: Lake Pontchartrain Camps
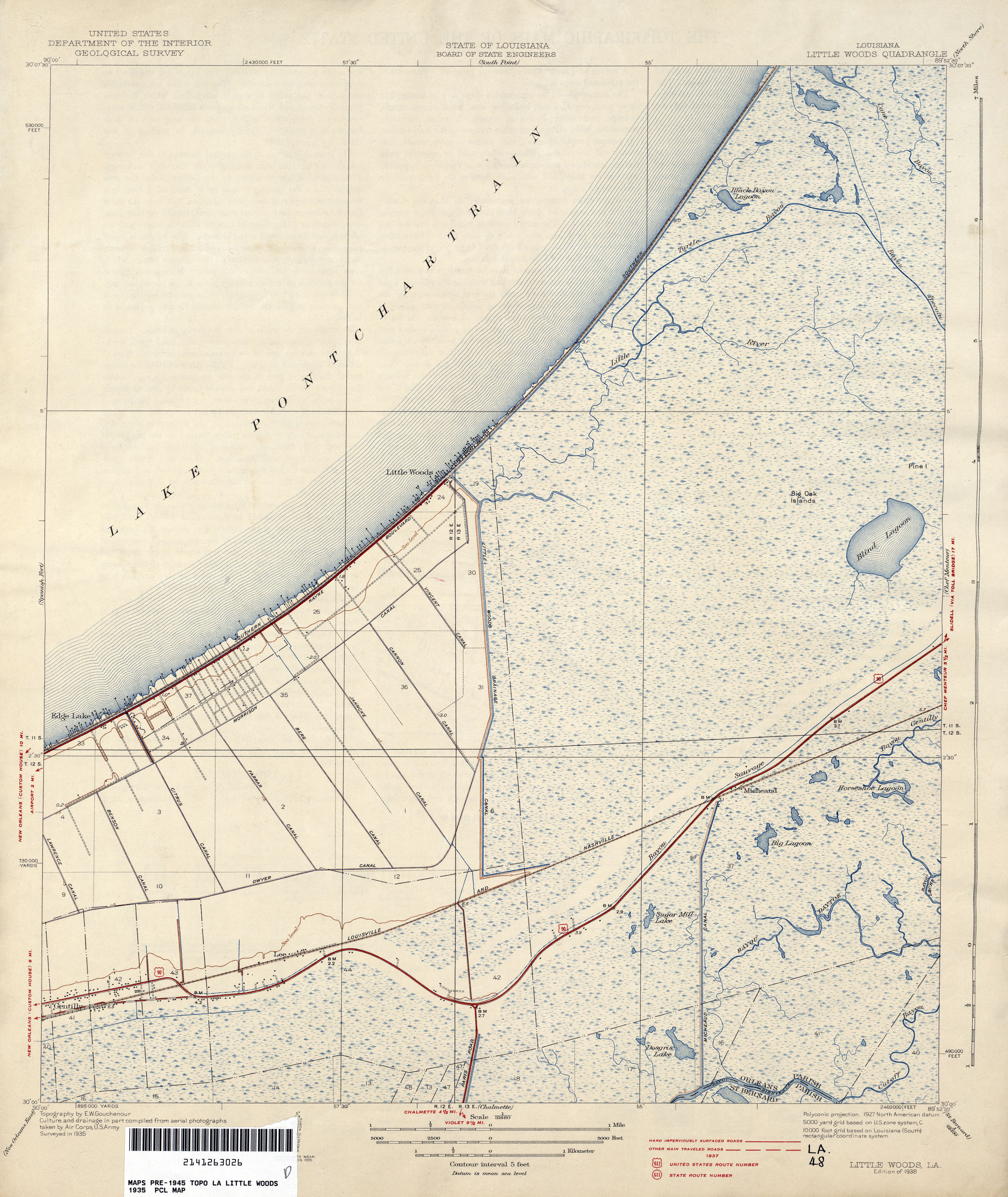
- 1935 map of portion of eastern New Orleans lakefront around Little Woods.
- Coordinates: 30°07′31″N 89°57′36″W
- Country: United States
- State: Louisiana
- Parish: Orleans
- Elevation: −3 ft (−0.91 m)
- Time zone: UTC-6 (Central (CST))
  - Summer (DST): UTC-5 (CDT)
- Area code: 504
- GNIS, 1980 feature ID: 543401

Little Woods (French: Le Petit Bois) was historically an unincorporated community on the shoreline of Lake Pontchartrain. The name in French, "Le Petit Bois" or The Little Woods can be found on the 1883 Lafon-Alphonse Michoud Map drafted by civil-engineer George N. Grandjean. "Little Woods", as a place designation that continues in local use. Little Woods also directly relates to the treed hammocks that were high Chénier ridges bordered by water and wetlands.

== Geological formation ==
During the late Pleistocene or early Post-Pleistocene age, deltaic processes formed the beaches on the southshore of Lake Pontchartrain. Due to restricted flow resulting from the Pine Island trend, a series of 4600-year old barrier islands were formed. The discoveries of the Pine Island Beach Trend were compiled by Saucier (1963). Previously, Rowett (1957) identified 87 species of mollusks here. He also established that there was a molluscan assemblage indicative of the conditions of deposition found on the shallow continental shelf described by Parker (1956).

== Archaeological remains ==
Archaeological exploration of the Little Woods Middens led to discoveries of pot sherds and pumice, while burial sites uncovered quartz crystals and bones, no C14 data was collected. Cultural and geologic evidence collected from shell middens indicate this area was inhabited from 500 BCE to 1 CE during the Tchula period. The Tchefuncte Culture existed in the Early Woodland Period and were the first commonly making pottery from the native clay. Major excavations of shell deposits were directed by Maurice Weil in 1934 as part of a CWA project, followed by J. Richard Czajcowski as part of a large LSU New Deal Project. The sites at Little Woods are 16OR1-5, near to the site are two other sites Paris Road 16OR15 and Haughs Canal 16OR28. Of these sites only a few remain today.

== Early exploration and development ==
René-Robert Cavelier, Sieur de La Salle, or Robert de La Salle (1643 – 1687) noted among his discoveries that the natives in Louisiana lived on pier like structures. Later, Pierre Le Moyne d'Iberville, Sieur d'Iberville, or Sieur d'Iberville et d'Ardillières (1661 –1706) explored the area for trade, from this time, King Louis XIV of France had a trading agreement with the local natives. A road was planned by Pierre Denis de la Ronde (1762 - 1824), the planned road went from Little Woods to the town of Versailles, Louisiana in St. Bernard Parish he envisioned a canal linking Lake Pontchartrain to the Mississippi River along what is now Paris Road. In 1803 Napoleon Bonaparte sold the Louisiana territories to the Spain.

alphonse michoud plantation map

== Early development ==
By 1882, Little Woods was part of the Lafon-Alphonse Michaud Plantation and a railroad was being constructed to link New Orleans as part of New Orleans & Northeastern Railroad. The longest train trestle bridge in the world was constructed. Railroad workers built section houses along the track and switched the passing trains onto the single track trestle, therefore, Little Woods became a whistle stop where trains would wait to cross the bridge. The train route leaving New Orleans to Little Woods is described in a newspaper article from 1887. A large wooden dancing platform on piers is noted, also camps had thatched Palmetto roofs, people fished and sold their seafood in the city.

In 1908 a train wreck occurred, one evening at the Little Woods Station two trains collided in the fog killing prominent figures of the community. One of the twelve victims was Jacob Salmen of The Salmen Brothers Brick and Lumber Company who later succumbed to his injuries.

== The Roaring Twenties ==
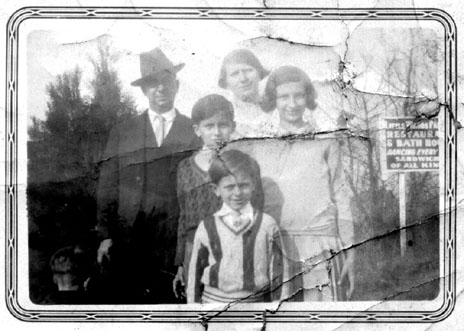
Louis Armstrong recalled, on page 47 of his autobiography, Satchmo: My Life in New Orleans, in 1913 at 13 years old, he was made a band leader and was sent to play at Milneberg and Little Woods. By the 1920s hundreds of camps ranged from Milneberg at West End to Little Woods in the East. Little Woods had become a vacation resort. Ragtime and early Jazz, called Ragajazz, was the music of the day. Heard in the area were bands like Kid Stevenson Jazz Hounds, Alcide yellow Nunez of the Original Dixieland Jazz Band, and Froggy's Moonlight Serenaders. During the 1920s plans for construction at Milneberg led to a few of those camps at that location to be moved to Little Woods.
