= Tornado outbreak of February 7, 2017 =

Weather event in the United States

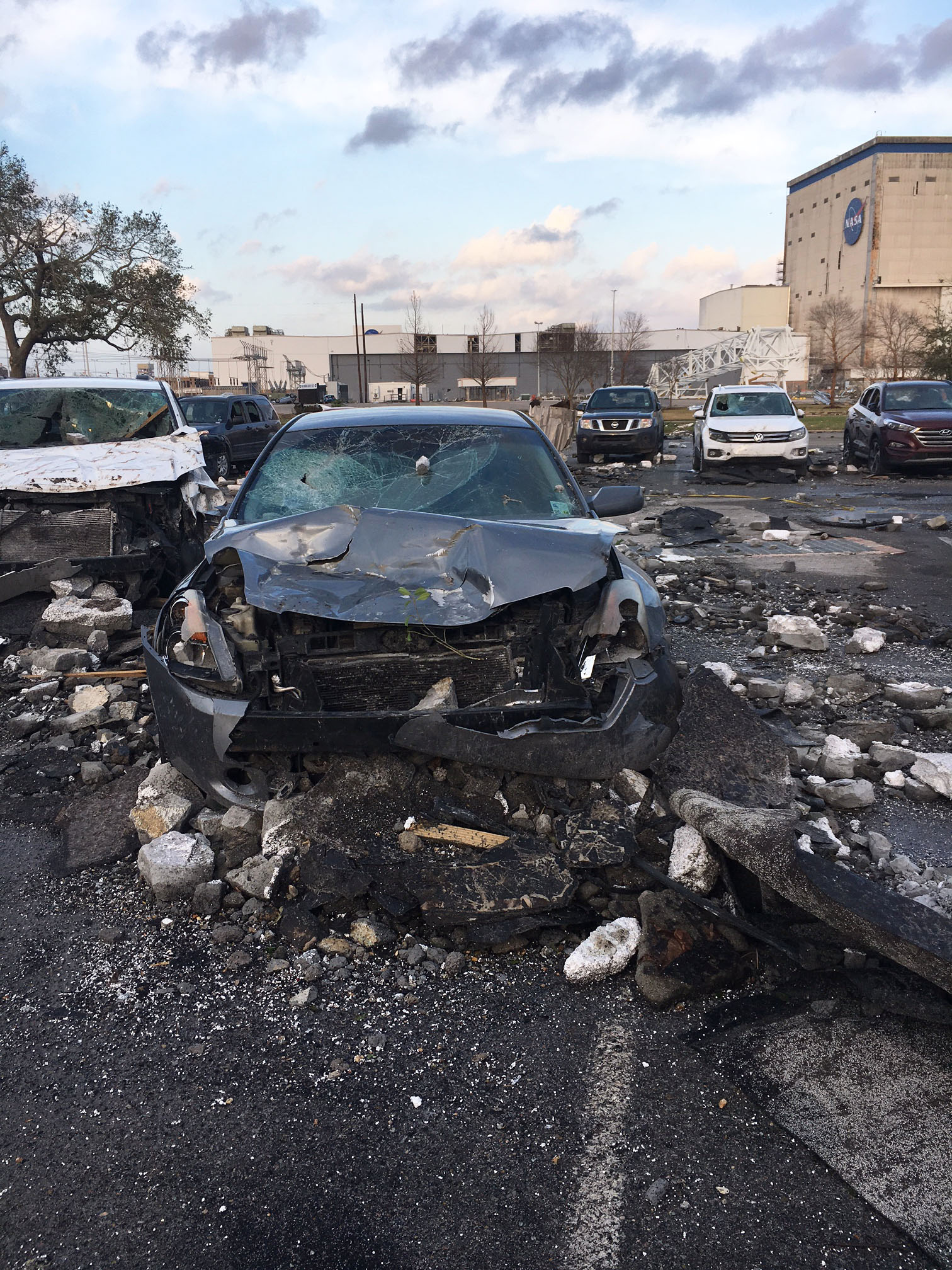
- Damage to vehicles at the National Finance Center from the EF3 New Orleans East tornado.

Meteorological history
- Date: February 7, 2017

Tornado outbreak
- Tornadoes: 17
- Max. rating: EF3 tornado
- Duration: 13 hours, 21 minutes
- Highest winds: Tornadic - 150 mph (240 km/h) in New Orleans, Louisiana. Non-tornadic - 87 mph (140 km/h) near Destin, Florida.
- Largest hail: 2.00 in (5.1 cm) in multiple locations

Overall effects
- Fatalities: 1
- Injuries: 40
- Damage: $175 million (2017 USD)
- Areas affected: Southeastern United States
- Part of the tornadoes of 2017

A small but damaging outbreak of 17 tornadoes impacted the Southeastern United States on February 7, 2017. The most damaging tornado of the outbreak was a large and powerful EF3 tornado. The tornado caused considerable damage along its path and left approximately 10,000 homes without electricity. 33 injuries occurred in the area after the tornado hit near Chef Menteur Highway with hundreds of structures sustaining moderate to significant damage along the ten-mile path. In response to the disaster, Governor John Bel Edwards declared a state of emergency.

Other destructive and strong tornadoes occurred on this day as well, including an EF1 tornado that killed a man near Donaldsonville, Louisiana and an EF2 tornado that injured three and caused considerable damage to homes, trees, and power lines in rural areas of Livingston Parish, Louisiana. Overall, the outbreak killed one and injured 40.

== Meteorological synopsis ==
Radar animation of the supercell that spawned the New Orleans tornado.

On February 4, the Storm Prediction Center (SPC) outlined a severe weather threat area across portions of the Ohio Valley southward into the northern Gulf Coast states. A corresponding Slight risk of severe weather was issued the following day from central Indiana and Ohio to northern Mississippi and Alabama, encompassed within a larger Marginal risk. Little change occurred for the 07:00 UTC Day 2 outlook, but the Marginal risk was eventually shifted to encompass portions of eastern Louisiana on the 17:30 UTC forecast. Early on February 7, the SPC expanded the Slight risk area and subsequently introduced a small Enhanced risk for portions of eastern Louisiana, southern Mississippi, southwestern Alabama, and the extreme western Florida Panhandle, although its intent was for the potential for large hail instead of significant tornadoes.

On February 7, an intensifying southern-stream shortwave trough progressed eastward from the southern Great Plains to the lower Mississippi Valley. Ahead of the trough, strong low- to mid-level winds transported abundant moisture northward from the Gulf of Mexico, with dewpoints reaching to lower to mid 60s °F. The combination of southwesterly flow and abnormally cold mid-level temperatures—approximately −14 to −17 °C (7 to 1 °F)—helped to destabilize the atmosphere, with maximum Convective Available Potential Energy values in the range of 1500–2000 j/kg. Veering winds—winds that turn clockwise with height—acted to lengthen hodographs and provide significant directional wind shear, with 0–6 km shear of 35–45 mph (56–72 km/h) and 0–3 km storm relative helicities of 200–300 m^{2}/s^{2}. Meanwhile, incredibly steep mid-level lapse rates near or above 8 C/km overspread the risk area. The increasingly conducive environment prompted the SPC to issue a tornado watch across southern Louisiana and Mississippi, valid from 7:55 a.m. CST (13:55 UTC) to 2:00 p.m. CST (21:00 UTC); forecasters assessed a 50% chance of two or more tornadoes in the watch box, but only a 20% chance of one or more strong (EF2+) tornadoes.

== Confirmed tornadoes ==
Confirmed tornadoes by Enhanced Fujita rating
EFU	EF0	EF1	EF2	EF3	EF4	EF5	Total
1	6	6	3	1	0	0	17

=== February 7 event ===
List of confirmed tornadoes – Tuesday, February 7, 2017 (Note: All dates are based on the local time zone where the tornado touched down; however, all times are in Coordinated Universal Time for consistency.)
EF#	Location	County / Parish	State	Start Coord.	Time (UTC)	Path length	Max width
EF0	W of Slayden	Houston	TN	36.279°N 87.5748°W	15:16–15:17	0.5 mi (0.80 km)	70 yd (64 m)
EF0	A weak tornado tracked east-northeast across SR 49, snapping numerous trees that fell in different directions, with several blocking the highway. It then struck a residence, causing minor exterior damage and blowing out a window, while a nearby carport collapsed, a shed was destroyed, and several other outbuildings were damaged. Debris and outdoor objects were scattered in a convergent pattern, with some debris carried several hundred yards across nearby fields. Farther east-northeast, the tornado struck a second home, causing additional minor exterior damage and blowing out another window, while destroying a nearby shed and snapping several more trees before dissipating.						
EF2	S of Killian to southern Madisonville	Livingston, Tangipahoa, St. Tammany	LA	30.3128°N 90.5857°W	16:19–17:06	26.95 mi (43.37 km)	800 yd (730 m)
EF2	This long-tracked tornado initially touched down near Carthage Bluff Landing, causing minor tree damage before rapidly intensifying. Several hardwood trees were snapped, two barns were completely destroyed, and a small wood-frame home was shifted off its block foundation and destroyed, resulting in two injuries. The tornado then turned east-southeast, causing significant damage to trees and marsh vegetation before crossing approximately 4 mi (6.4 km) of Lake Maurepas and moving ashore in Tangipahoa Parish. A well-defined damage path continued through wooded and marshy areas before crossing I-55. The tornado subsequently intensified to peak intensity over the Joyce Wildlife Management Area, producing extensive damage to trees and marsh vegetation. After crossing the Tangipahoa River, the tornado began to narrow but continued producing significant damage in a small neighborhood along Lake Pontchartrain. It then weakened and narrowed as it approached Madisonville, eventually dissipating as it entered the town, where no additional damage was identified.						
EF0	Eastern Elmwood to western Jefferson	Jefferson	LA	29.9611°N 90.1782°W	16:51–16:52	0.95 mi (1.53 km)	25 yd (23 m)
EF0	A brief tornado caused minor roof and tree damage.						
EF1	Donaldsonville to N of Union	Ascension, St. James	LA	30.0975°N 91.005°W	17:04–17:16	6.15 mi (9.90 km)	150 yd (140 m)
EF1	1 death – This tornado touched down in Donaldsonville, damaging the roofs of several homes, downing trees and power lines, and shifting a small home off its pier foundation. It continued east-northeast near LA 18, damaging additional structures, trees, and power lines before crossing into St. James Parish. Approximately 18 homes were damaged in Ascension Parish. The tornado then tracked nearly due east through communities on both sides of the Mississippi River near the LA 70 bridge, causing roof damage, blowing out windows, and downing additional trees and power lines. A trailer was rolled, killing a man. The tornado eventually dissipated over open agricultural fields near LA 70.						
EF3	Eastern New Orleans	Orleans	LA	30.0105°N 90°W	17:12–17:33	9.88 mi (15.90 km)	600 yd (550 m)
EF3	See section on this tornado - 33 people were injured.						
EF2	S of Weiss to SE of Georgeville	Livingston	LA	30.621°N 90.91°W	17:46–18:25	19 mi (31 km)	250 yd (230 m)
EF2	A strong tornado initially touched down southeast of Weiss, producing primarily tree damage and minor structural damage before rapidly intensifying as it crossed Spillers Creek. Large swaths of trees were snapped, and an electrical transmission tower collapsed as the tornado approached its peak intensity. Continuing eastward, the tornado completely destroyed three manufactured homes, caused significant roof damage to two single-family homes, and snapped or uprooted numerous trees. The tornado gradually weakened as it moved through rural areas of northern Livingston Parish, damaging additional roofs and trees while producing extensive damage in heavily forested areas, where more than three quarters of trees were uprooted in some locations. It eventually weakened but continued snapping and uprooting trees as it crossed LA 441 and LA 43 before dissipating. This tornado was originally rated EF3 before being downgraded during reanalysis in 2026.						
EF0	E of Meraux	St. Bernard	LA	29.94°N 89.88°W	18:36–18:40	2.6 mi (4.2 km)	25 yd (23 m)
EF0	A tornado did minor damage to tree tops and vegetation before moving offshore onto Lake Borgne. This tornado was officially documented in 2026. This tornado and the 1904 UTC EFU were likely the same, long-track tornado.						
EFU	NE of Shell Beach	St. Bernard	LA	29.98°N 89.57°W	19:04–19:17	7.74 mi (12.46 km)	200 yd (180 m)
EFU	A waterspout moved onshore from Lake Borgne in eastern St. Bernard Parish and tracked entirely through marshland, leaving a visible path of damaged vegetation. The tornado likely reached its peak intensity near Magill Lagoon, where extensive scarring of the marsh vegetation was observed in satellite imagery, with the damage remaining visible for several months. Radar imagery also detected a tornado debris signature extending to at least 20,000 ft (6,100 m) above the ground, suggesting the tornado may have reached EF2 intensity or greater. However, its actual intensity could not be determined due to the lack of identifiable damage indicators along its path. This tornado was likely a continuation of the 1836 UTC EF0 as it crossed Lake Borgne. This tornado was officially documented in 2026.						
EF0	E of Pike Road	Montgomery	AL	32.2737°N 86.053°W	19:42–19:43	0.2 mi (0.32 km)	85 yd (78 m)
EF0	Several trees were snapped or uprooted and a small garden shed was heavily damaged.						
EF0	Eastern Andalusia	Covington	AL	31.3141°N 86.4634°W	21:23–21:24	0.51 mi (0.82 km)	150 yd (140 m)
EF0	This high-end EF0 tornado moved through eastern portions of Andalusia, affecting two residential areas and a campground. Several homes sustained roof shingle damage, numerous trees were downed, and multiple campers and RVs were overturned. A large metal storage building at the Covington County Water Authority was also damaged, with numerous water pipes tossed around the facility. One person was injured.						
EF1	NE of Fortson to SW of Cataula	Harris	GA	32.6234°N 84.9057°W	21:36–21:39	2.31 mi (3.72 km)	250 yd (230 m)
EF1	This tornado touched down west of US 27, snapping several small trees before tracking northeast and intensifying as it crossed the highway between Fortson and Cataula. Numerous trees were snapped or uprooted, and several power lines and poles were downed. The most significant damage occurred farther northeast, where approximately 50–100 large trees were snapped or uprooted, including one that fell onto a home and caused significant damage. The tornado continued northeast, snapping and uprooting an additional grove of trees east of US 27 before dissipating.						
EF2	SSW of Harperville to NNE of Forest	Scott	MS	32.4393°N 89.5248°W	22:07–22:17	4.83 mi (7.77 km)	880 yd (800 m)
EF2	A low-end EF2 tornado touched down and snapped several small trees before tracking eastward, snapping and uprooting additional trees along its path. The tornado reached its peak intensity as it crossed MS 35, where multiple flea market buildings were destroyed, two residences were damaged, and a large tree fell onto one home, causing significant damage. A shed was also destroyed, the roof was torn off a barn, and numerous trees were snapped or uprooted. Continuing eastward, the tornado damaged another shed and additional trees before crossing MS 21, where it broke several tree branches and dissipated shortly afterward.						
EF1	S of Garlandville to W of Rose Hill	Jasper	MS	32.1479°N 89.1177°W	23:23–23:31	3.09 mi (4.97 km)	50 yd (46 m)
EF1	This tornado began in a wooded area and tracked southeast, snapping and uprooting several trees along its path. It then damaged the porch roof of a residence before continuing southeast, snapping a few additional trees and eventually dissipating.						
EF0	WNW of Cadiz	Trigg	KY	36.8842°N 87.9365°W	01:40–01:45	2 mi (3.2 km)	50 yd (46 m)
EF0	A weak tornado touched down along KY 274 in a hilly, wooded area near Lake Barkley, uprooting or snapping at least a dozen trees, several of which fell onto the highway. A fallen tree also partially downed a power line, while several pieces of metal roofing were torn from a barn and carried into nearby woods where the tornado lifted.						
EF1	Lawtey	Bradford	FL	30.046°N 82.0734°W	03:00–03:01	1.06 mi (1.71 km)	75 yd (69 m)
EF1	A brief tornado damaged an elementary school and downed numerous trees and power lines. Two people were injured.						
EF1	E of Green Cove Springs	St. Johns	FL	29.9559°N 81.5353°W	03:37–03:40	0.53 mi (0.85 km)	160 yd (150 m)
EF1	Two homes sustained significant roof and exterior damage.						

=== New Orleans East–Lake Borgne, Louisiana ===
New Orleans East–Lake Borgne-Chalmette, Louisiana
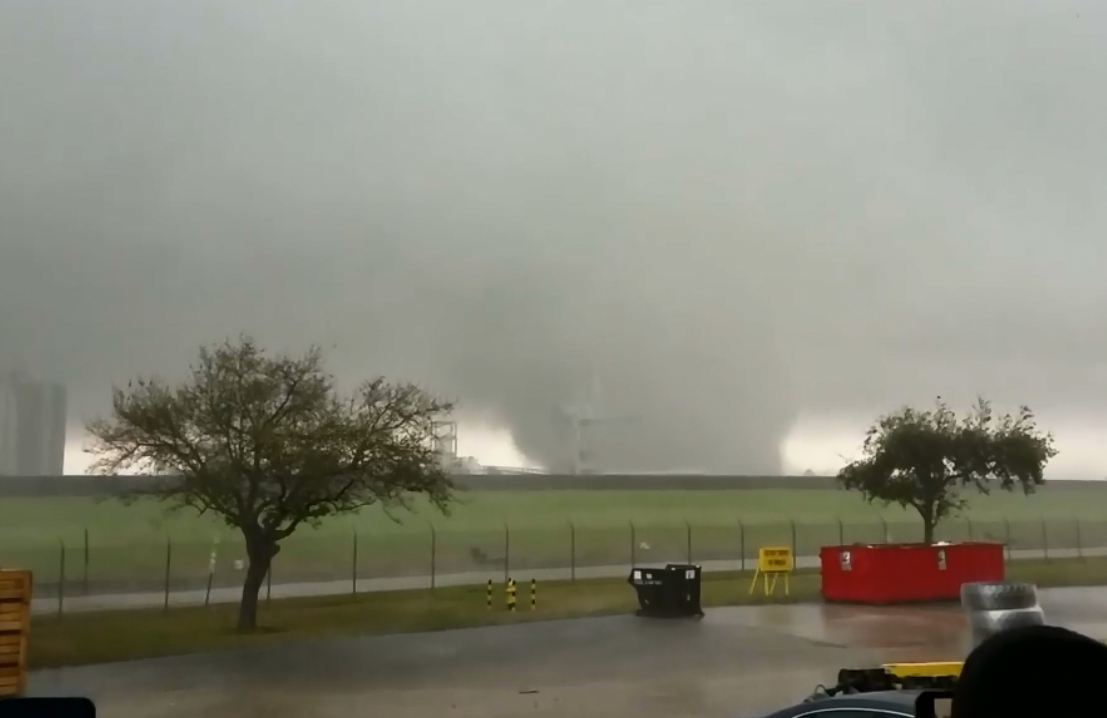
- The tornado as seen from NASA's Michoud Assembly Facility.

Meteorological history
- Formed: 11:12 a.m. CST; February 7, 2017
- Dissipated: 11:32 a.m. CST; February 7, 2017
- Duration: 20 minutes

EF3 tornado
- on the Enhanced Fujita scale
- Highest winds: 150 mph (240 km/h)

Overall effects
- Injuries: 33 injuries, 6 serious
- Damage: $2.7 million (2017 USD)

The tornado initially touched down along Old Gentilly Road to the east of the New Orleans Industrial Canal. EF0 damage was noted at the beginning of the path as homes sustained minor roof damage. EF1 damage occurred near Wilson Avenue as a two-story motel had much of its poorly attached roof uplifted and sustained buckling of exterior walls on the second floor. The tornado moved northeastward, attaining high-end EF2 intensity by the time it reached the Chef Menteur Highway (US 90). Metal power poles were bent, wooden power poles were snapped, a business was severely damaged, and an apartment complex sustained significant roof damage and collapse of a brick fascia exterior wall in this area. Damage surveys indicate that as the tornado continued on this northeastward track, it became multiple-vortex in structure, with a second circulation north of the first taking over as the predominant one. This second vortex, as the tornado did when it originally touched down, moved in a northeastward direction and produced EF2 damage near the Flake Street/Grant Avenue intersection. A small, poorly constructed home along Flake Street was rolled off of its cinder block foundation and completely destroyed, while nearby homes sustained shingle and porch damage. East of Crowder Boulevard, a continuous swath of mainly EF2 damage was noted as the now large and destructive tornado moved through residential areas, severely damaging numerous homes, many of which had their roofs ripped off. A few of these homes sustained some failure of exterior walls. Vehicles in this area were flipped and damaged, some of which were tossed into homes. On Arthur Drive and Charlene Drive, a small pocket of EF3 damage was noted as two homes lost most of their exterior walls, and had one or two of their interior walls collapse due to winds estimated by the NWS to have been around 140 miles per hour (230 km/h).

Along Grant Street, Schaumburg Elementary School sustained minor roof damage and broken windows as it was impacted by the outer edge of the circulation. Children inside the school took shelter in an interior hallway as the tornado struck and were not injured. Just east of this point, a large area of mid-range EF3 damage was observed. This damage was confined to an area along and just north of Grant Street between Read Boulevard and Chalmark Drive, where dozens of homes lost much to all of their roof structures and sustained collapse of multiple exterior walls. Large, two-story brick homes had only one or two interior corner walls left standing on their top floors, and a two-story apartment building sustained total roof loss and collapse of numerous second floor walls, with some collapse of first floor exterior walls noted as well. It was determined that the tornado reached peak its intensity in this area, with winds estimated at 150 miles per hour (240 km/h). The tornado then caused high-end EF2 damage further to the east as it moved through additional residential areas. Many homes in this area had roofs torn off and sustained some collapse of exterior walls. A second small area of mid-range EF3 damage was noted near Hauck Drive, where a large church was left with only one exterior wall standing, and sustained total collapse of most interior walls. Winds at this location were again estimated around 150 miles per hour (240 km/h).

The tornado essentially followed the Chef Menteur Highway as it continued eastward, significantly damaging homes and other structures at EF2 strength along this segment of the path. A small strip mall and a church sustained major roof damage and had every window blown out. A gas station was also heavily damaged and had its service station canopy shredded. Homes had their roofs completely removed, and many concrete light poles were snapped. A final segment of low-end EF3 damage occurred further east as several large metal power pylons along the highway were bent in half. High-end EF2 damage occurred in neighborhoods just north of the highway, as numerous homes sustained significant roof and exterior wall loss. Past Bullard Avenue, the tornado weakened to EF1 strength and the damage path shifted southward. Numerous small trees were snapped near the I-510 and Almonaster Avenue interchange. The tornado then restrengthened to EF2 intensity as it caused heavy damage to NASA's Michoud Assembly Facility. Windows were blown out, and large metal industrial buildings sustained major structural damage. The large, two-story office building that houses the National Finance Center suffered significant roof damage and collapse of both the brick facade and cinder block exterior walls in a few places. Vehicles in the National Finance Center parking lot were severely damaged. The tornado then continued eastward across unpopulated marshy areas before dissipating over Lake Borgne.

In all, the tornado significantly damaged or destroyed at least 638 homes and 40 businesses along its 10.1-mile-long (16.3 km) path, and hundreds of trees and power poles were snapped. Thirty-three people were injured, six severely; however, no fatalities took place. Two public schools— Schaumburg Elementary and Einstein Charter School—both sustained some damage to buildings and property, with collective damage reaching $1.7 million. NASA's Michoud Assembly Facility suffered more than $1 million in damage. At the time, it was the strongest tornado to strike the New Orleans metropolitan area. However, it would be surpassed on March 22, 2022 by a high-end EF3 tornado, which killed one person and injured multiple others as it caused considerable damage in Arabi.

== Non-tornadic effects ==
Wind gusts reached 62 miles per hour (100 km/h) in western Tennessee during the storms.

== Aftermath ==
John Bel Edwards dispatched the National Guard across Louisiana to prevent looting following the outbreak.

== See also ==
- List of North American tornadoes and tornado outbreaks
- Tornado outbreak of February 23–24, 2016
- Tornado outbreak of December 16–17, 2019
- Tornado outbreak of March 21–23, 2022
