= Michoud Assembly Facility =

NASA rocket manufacturing complex in Michoud, New Orleans

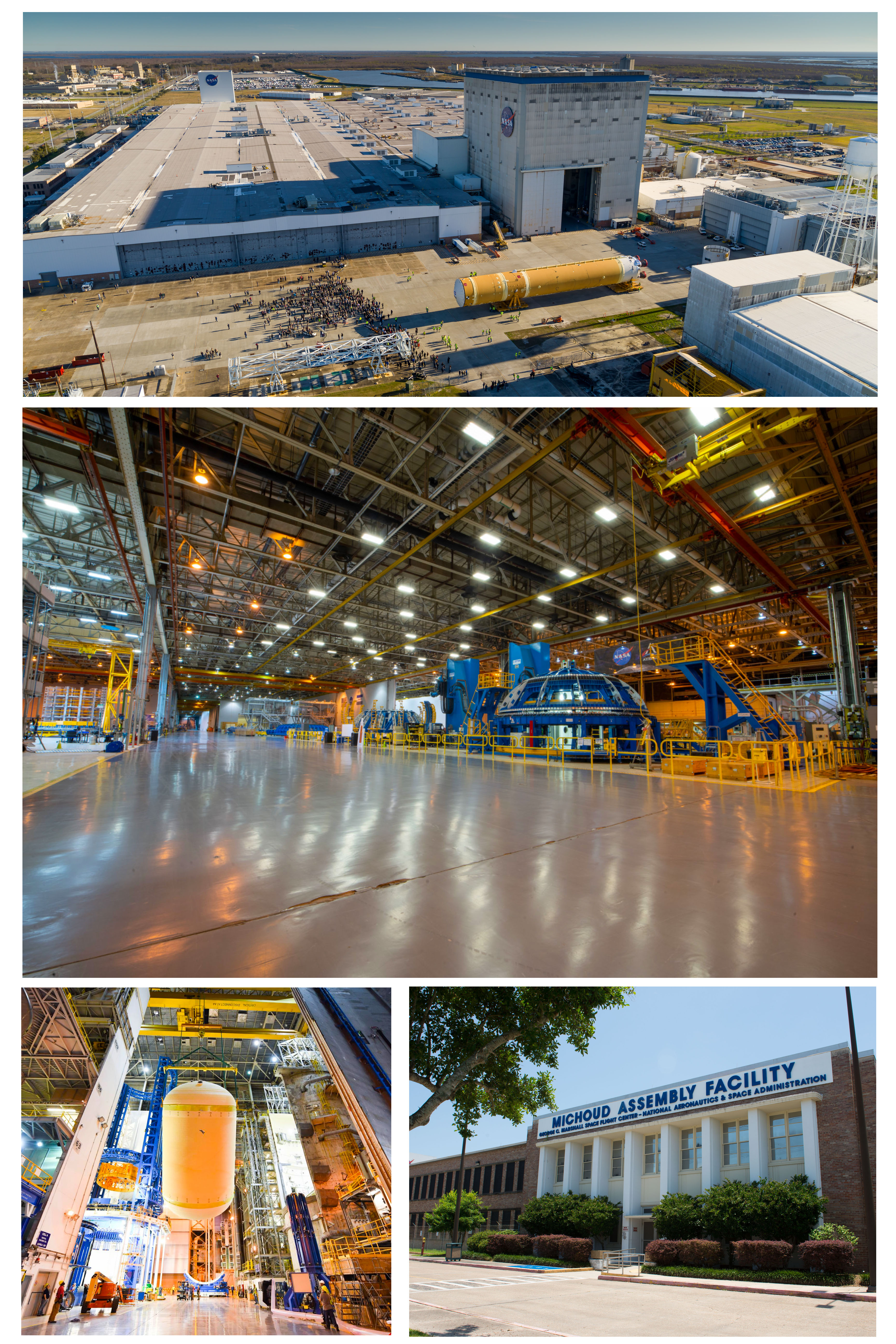
- Top to bottom, left to right: Aerial view of MAF in January 2020, the factory floor, Artemis I liquid oxygen tank in the South Vertical Assembly Building, and the entrance to the lobby and administration offices.

Agency overview
- Formed: September 7, 1961; 65 years ago
- Jurisdiction: Federal government of the United States
- Headquarters: New Orleans, Louisiana, United States; 30°01′30″N 89°54′54″W
- Agency executive: Hansel D. V. Gill, director
- Parent agency: Marshall Space Flight Center (NASA)
- Website: nasa.gov/michoud-assembly-facility

The Michoud Assembly Facility (MAF) is an 832-acre (337-hectare) industrial complex for the manufacture and structural assembly of aerospace vehicles and components. It is owned by NASA and located in New Orleans East, a section of New Orleans, Louisiana, in the United States. Organizationally it is part of NASA's Marshall Space Flight Center, and is currently a multi-tenant complex to allow commercial and government contractors, as well as government agencies, to use the site.

MAF is one of the largest manufacturing plants in the world with 43 environmentally controlled acres—174,000 m^{2} (1,870,000 sq ft)—under one roof, and it employs more than 4,200 people. From September 1961 to the end of the Apollo program in December 1972 the site was utilized by Chrysler to build the S-I and S-IB first stages of the Saturn I and Saturn IB rockets, later joined by Boeing to build the S-IC first stage of the Saturn V. From September 5, 1973, to September 20, 2010, the factory was used by Martin Marietta for construction of the Space Shuttle's external fuel tanks. Today, MAF is used by Boeing to fabricate and assemble the core stage of the Space Launch System rocket and by Lockheed Martin to build the pressure vessel of the Orion spacecraft.

== History ==
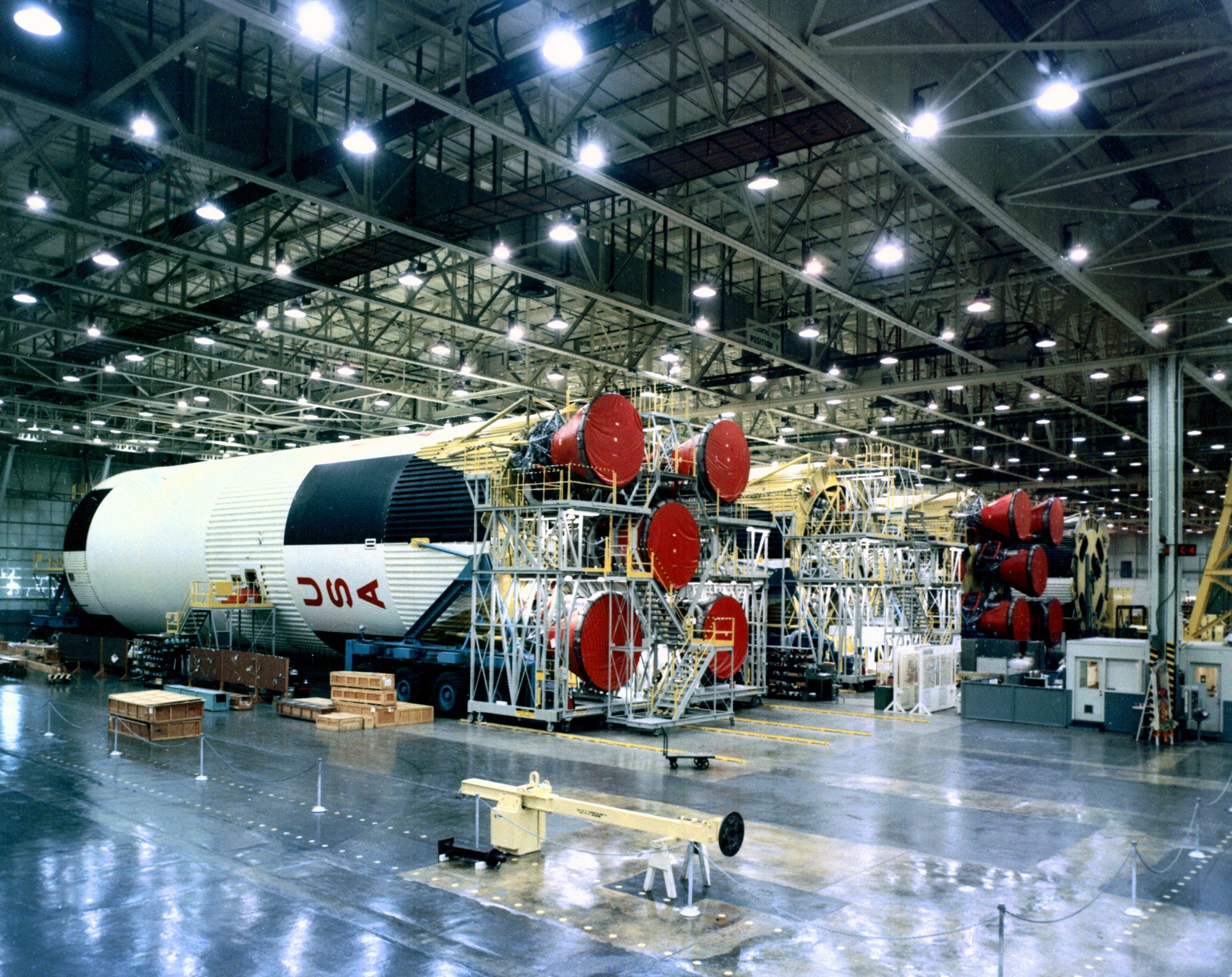
First stages of Saturn V rockets being assembled at the Michoud factory in the 1960s

The facility was originally constructed in 1940 at the village of Michoud, Louisiana, by the Higgins-Tucker division of Higgins Industries under the direction of Andrew Jackson Higgins. Construction was on behalf of the United States government for the war production during World War II of plywood C-76 cargo planes and the Higgins Boat landing craft. The project cost $180 million ($2.8 billion in 2018). Production of the C-76 never commenced and instead produced two Curtiss C-46 Commando in 1943 and remaining order cancelled in 1944. The facility was referred to as Michoud (Factory) Airfield in the 1940s and briefly as a National Guard field in 1949, but became inactive by 1952.

During the Korean War, the Chrysler Corporation utilized remaining manufacturing infrstructure and rechristened the factory as the Michoud Ordnance Plant, where it produced engines for Sherman and Patton tanks, and boasted a 1,700-metre (5,500 ft) paved runway. While production shut down with the end of U.S. active involvement in the war, the presence of Chrysler's remaining assets at Michoud played a role in the site's selection by Wernher von Braun to serve as Marshall Space Flight Center's primary manufacturing facility. MSFC Michoud Operations came under the management of NASA in 1961, and was renamed Michoud Assembly Facility in 1965. Over the next decade, the facility was used for the construction of the S-IC first stage of the Saturn V rockets and the S-IB first stage of the Saturn IB rockets built by Chrysler Corporation. It is home to the first stage of the last-constructed Saturn V, SA-515, built by The Boeing Company. The factory's ceiling height limitation of 12 meters ruled out the construction of the bigger Saturn C-8 direct-ascent vehicle there, and therefore was one of the major reasons why the smaller C-5 (later renamed Saturn V) was chosen instead of the originally planned C-8 Moon vehicle. The runway was slowly transformed into Saturn Boulevard in the 1960s with the middle becoming a heliport and decommissioned by the 1970s.

The majority of the NASA factory's history was focused on construction and production of NASA's Space Shuttle external tank (ET). Beginning with the rollout of ET-1 on June 29, 1979, which flew on STS-1, 136 tanks were produced throughout the Space Shuttle program, ending with the flight-ready tank ET-122, which flew on STS-134, rolled out on September 20, 2010. A single tank produced at the facility, ET-94, was not used in spaceflight and remained at Michoud as a test article.

Modular parts for the International Space Station were fabricated at the facility in the mid-1990s until 2010.

The factory is now the location for the Space Launch System (SLS)'s core and future second stage construction by Boeing. SLS is the most powerful rocket NASA has ever created, and ranks third in history of spaceflight, after the N1 and the SpaceX Starship. It carries the Orion spacecraft, whose crew module is also being built at Michoud, but by Lockheed Martin. It has 50% more volume than the Apollo command capsule and will carry four to six astronauts. The first launch occurred on November 16, 2022.

=== TACA Flight 110 Emergency ===
On May 24, 1988, TACA Flight 110 operated with a Boeing 737-300 jetliner made a successful emergency landing on a grassy levee in the Michoud grounds after power was lost in both engines during a severe thunderstorm. The aircraft was towed into the Michoud facility, where its engines were replaced. On 6 June, it took off, with a crew of two and minimal fuel, using the former runway at Michoud, which had been reused as a road, Saturn Boulevard. It was flown the short distance to New Orleans International Airport, where it was fully repaired.

=== Hurricane Katrina ===
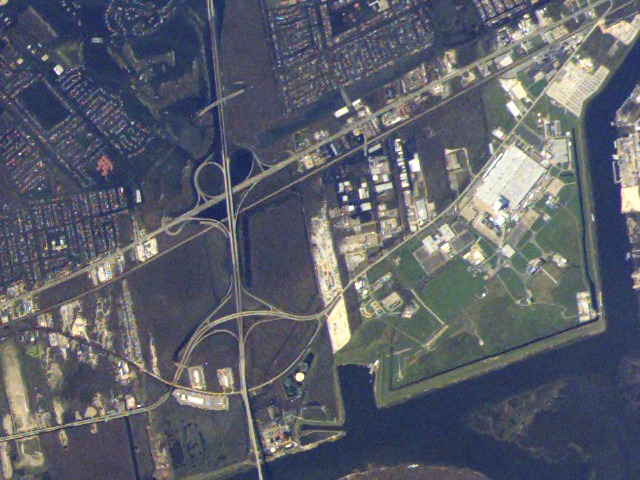
A section of eastern New Orleans after Hurricane Katrina. The Michoud Assembly Facility (MAF) at right (green) is not flooded, while the surrounding neighborhoods (dark greenish brown) are extensively flooded.

The facility did not experience significant flooding during Hurricane Katrina due to a natural ridge that runs along its northwestern boundary, the levee that makes up the southern and eastern boundaries, and the work of the pump operators who stayed to protect the facility during the storm. Several buildings sustained wind and rainwater damage. All shifts were initially canceled up to September 26, 2005, potentially setting back future Shuttle flights. All the buildings and the shuttle hardware within survived the hurricane without grave damage, but the roof of the main manufacturing building was breached and debris damaged ET-122 stored inside; that tank was refurbished and later flew on the final flight of Space Shuttle Endeavour, STS-134. Thirty-eight NASA and Lockheed Martin employees stayed behind during Hurricane Katrina to operate the pumping systems, knowing that if not activated and sustained, the facility would have been destroyed. The workers pumped more than one billion gallons (3,800,000 m^{3}) of water out of the facility and probably were the reason that the rocket factory suffered very little damage. These employees were each awarded the NASA Exceptional Bravery Medal, NASA's highest bravery award.

On September 16, 2005 NASA announced that the repairs were progressing faster than anticipated, and so they would continue to use Michoud for external tank work. On October 3, 2005, the facility officially reopened for essential personnel, though some key personnel had returned earlier. On October 31, 2005, the facility reopened to all personnel.

On February 7, 2017, an EF3 tornado carved a path through Orleans Parish, in which the factory is located. Two major buildings including the main manufacturing building were damaged, with multiple broken windows. Five people were injured, and resulting repairs and other factors contributed to the delay of the first SLS launch until late 2022.

== Buildings ==
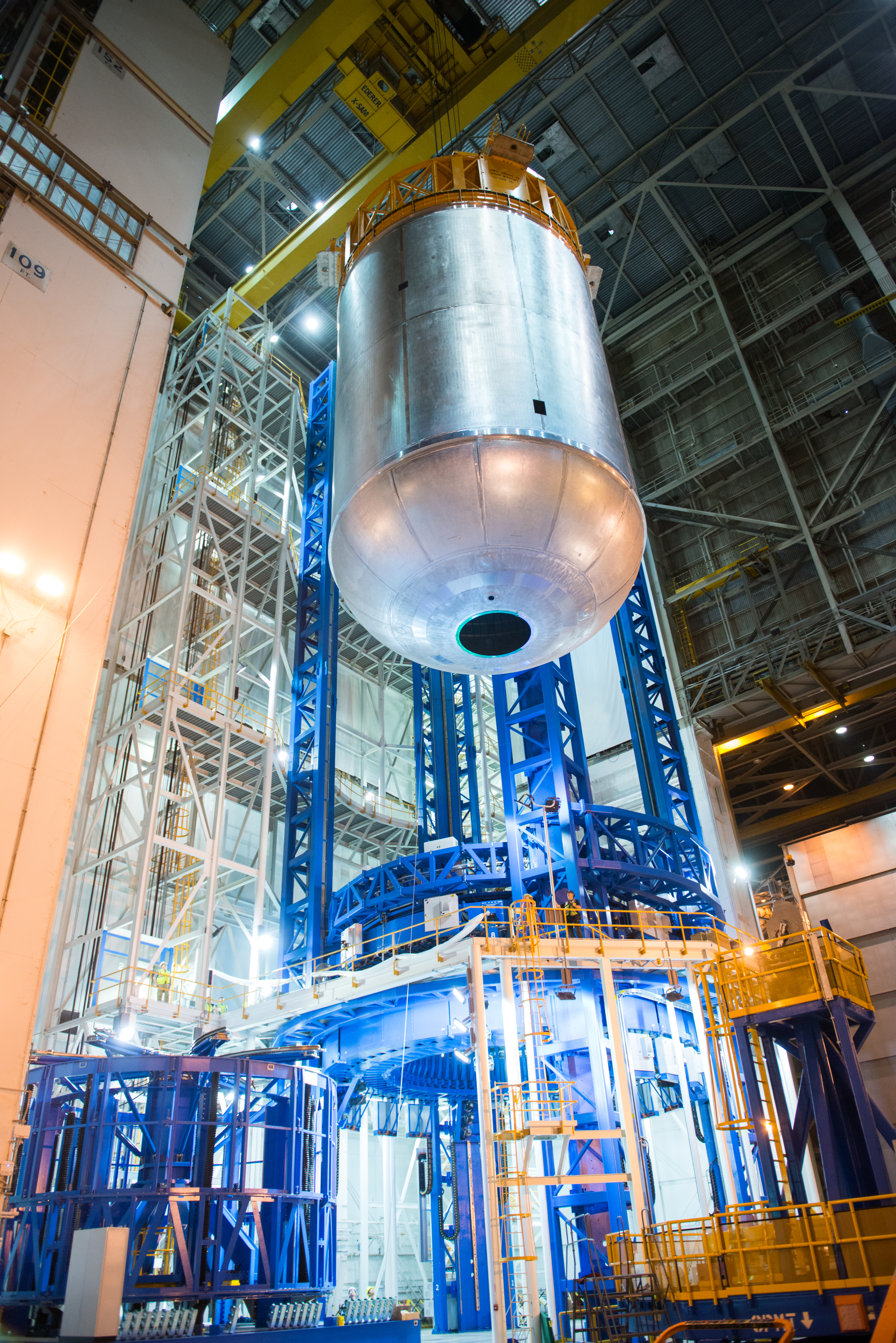
Welding of the SLS liquid oxygen tank in the South Vertical Assembly Building

The facility consists of various buildings in one complex:

- The main manufacturing building (Building number 103), and the North and South Vertical Assembly Buildings (Building numbers 115 and 110 respectively). The North VAB was constructed in 2011, initially to add new vertical welding equipment. The main manufacturing building is where the majority of preliminary fabrication and welding activities take place - the Space Launch System core stage (and previously the Space Shuttle External Tank, ISS modular components, and the Saturn V first stage) were manufactured here. Engine installation for the SLS core stage occurs here. The building stretches 512 by 340 meters in dimensions, and contains over 40 sub-areas for different manufacturing and structural assembly operations. A series of internal roads made from polished concrete provide ease of access by factory vehicles, trams, and overhead cranes to move components around. They run the whole length of the factory building. Factory floor office buildings and engineering rooms located in various ends of the main manufacturing building. Near the South VAB is an electric arc furnace and casting equipment. In front of the main manufacturing building is the administration offices, lobby, restaurants and engineering conference rooms. There is also a gym, media lab, a medical area and a cafeteria provided for the workers. Facing north is a factory floor museum display area, with mission patches, flags and memorials.
- An external building that is used to manufacture smaller components and space station equipment, for example small components for the International Space Station. It also supplies various small components such as fasteners to the main building.
- Another external building for various manufacturing processes, and contains a laboratory, office space and technical storage areas.
- Adjacent to the main manufacturing building are more foam application workshops, power transformers for the arc furnace and other facilities, and large amounts of open space. In front of the South VAB, rocket parts are moved from this building to the side internal workshops across the plaza for inspection and checks.
- The National Finance Center (NSF) - was formerly located west of the complex; housed offices for the U.S. Department of Agriculture, and contained several large conference rooms, a restaurant and a ballroom for NASA employees and visitor events. The building was badly damaged by a tornado in 2017, which rendered the building irreparable. It was subsequently demolished in 2019 and a new replacement is yet to be built.

The shipping port is located 600 meters southwest of the main manufacturing building. Transporting vehicles carrying manufactured SLS components move down Saturn Blvd, past large open fields, to the pier - where the Pegasus Barge is docked. This is where the components are shipped to either their final destination - Kennedy Space Center, or rarely back to the main Marshall Space Flight Center in Huntsville, Alabama, or the John C. Stennis Space Center in Mississippi for testing.

== Other activities ==
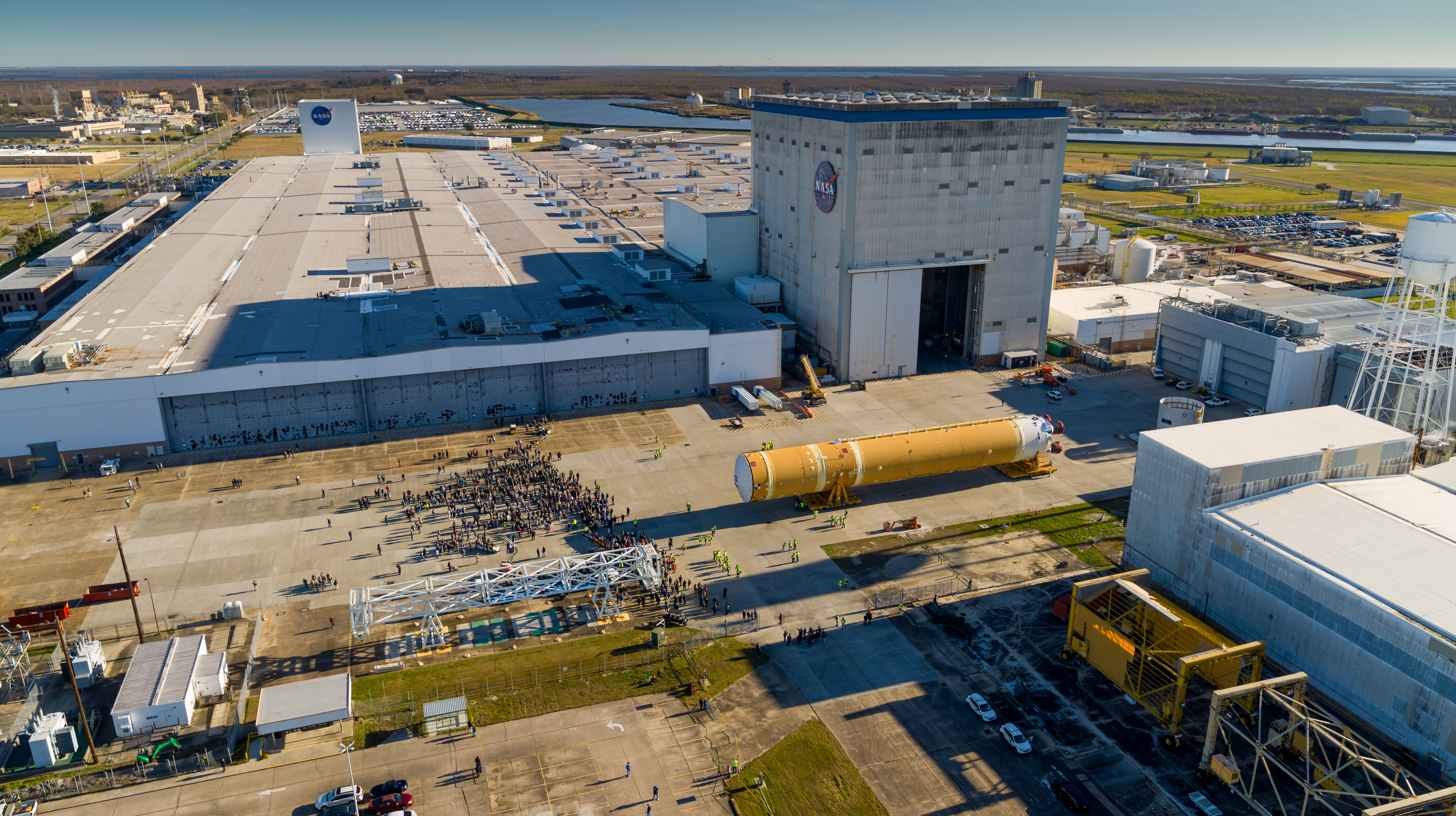
The Michoud main manufacturing building and the twin vertical assembly buildings as seen from a drone in January 2020. The Artemis I core stage is being rolled out, along with a crowd of workers

The Michoud Assembly Facility also houses other organizations such as the National Finance Center operated by the United States Department of Agriculture, the United States Coast Guard, and GE.

The factory complex is open to the public (though through pre-booking in advance). Visitors must sign in at main reception and clear security.

NASA planned to use the rocket factory to build the structure for several components of the cancelled Constellation program, including the Orion spacecraft, the Ares I Upper Stage, and the Ares V Core Stage. Under the Obama administration, the Constellation Program was cancelled in 2010, but was replaced with SLS a year later to continue space exploration efforts.

NASA has an agreement in place to rent out a portion of the facility to Big Easy Studios, a New Orleans film studio. This deal has been criticized by competing studios as violating NASA's rule that any deal with an outside entity must serve the agency's mission and must not compete with the private sector. NASA officials defend the agreement, stating that this helps to offset the cost of unused space on the facility and that their pricing is vetted by state and local economic development agencies to ensure it is not competing with the private market. Portions of Ender's Game, G.I. Joe: Retaliation, and Dawn of the Planet of the Apes were filmed at the factory.

== Gallery ==
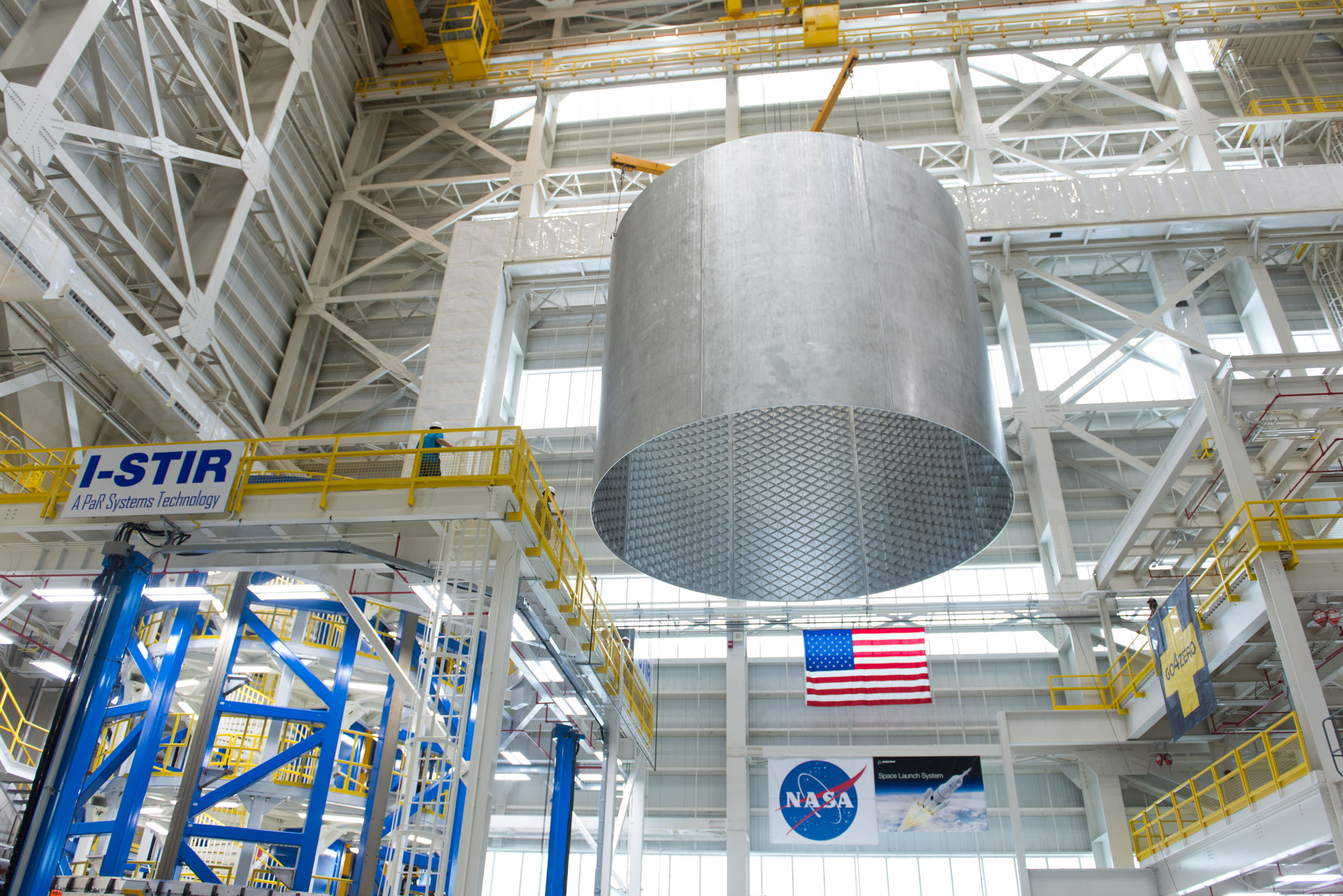
SLS core stage segment at its I-STIR weld equipment in the North Vertical Assembly Building

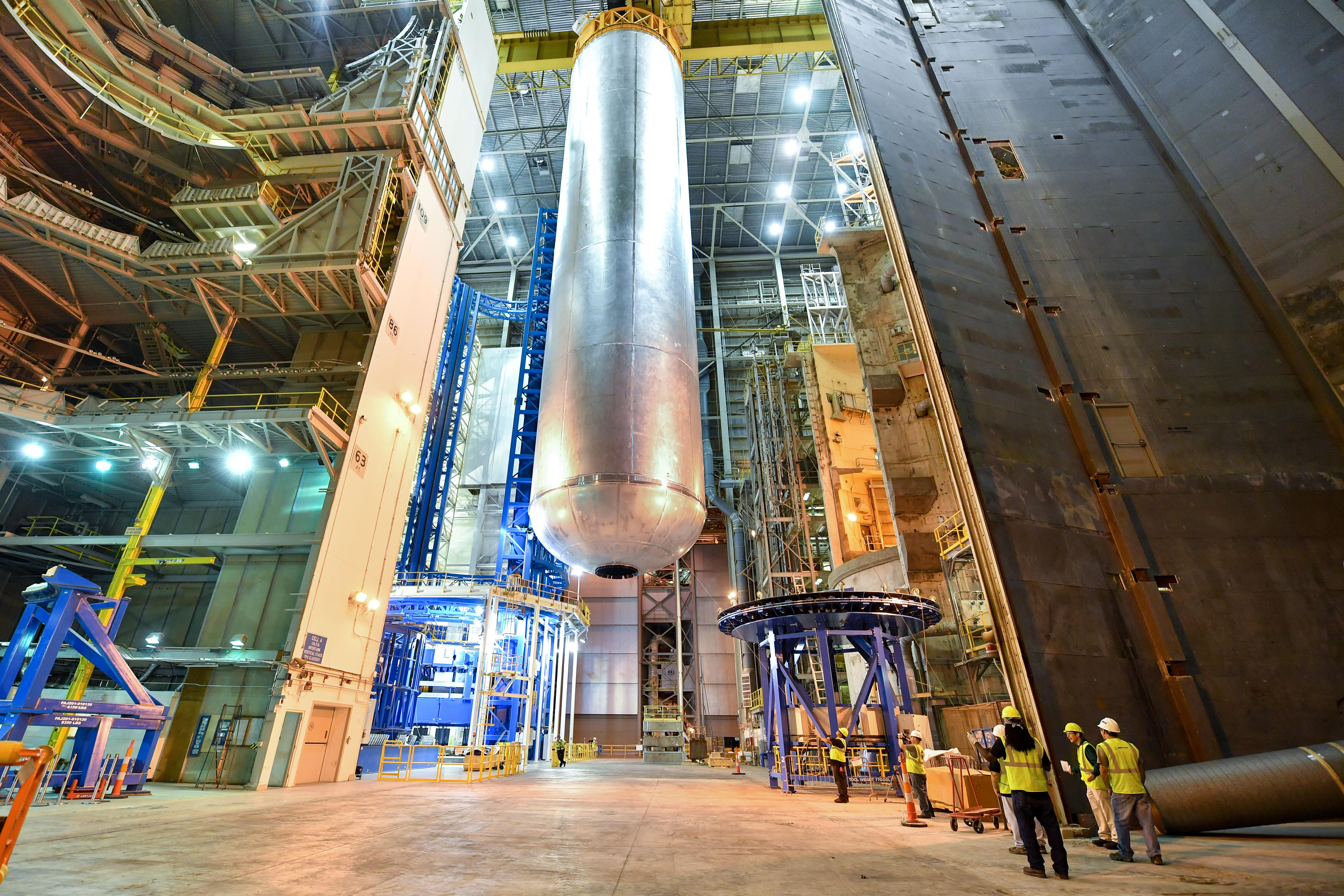
Welding of the SLS liquid hydrogen tank in the South Vertical Assembly Building

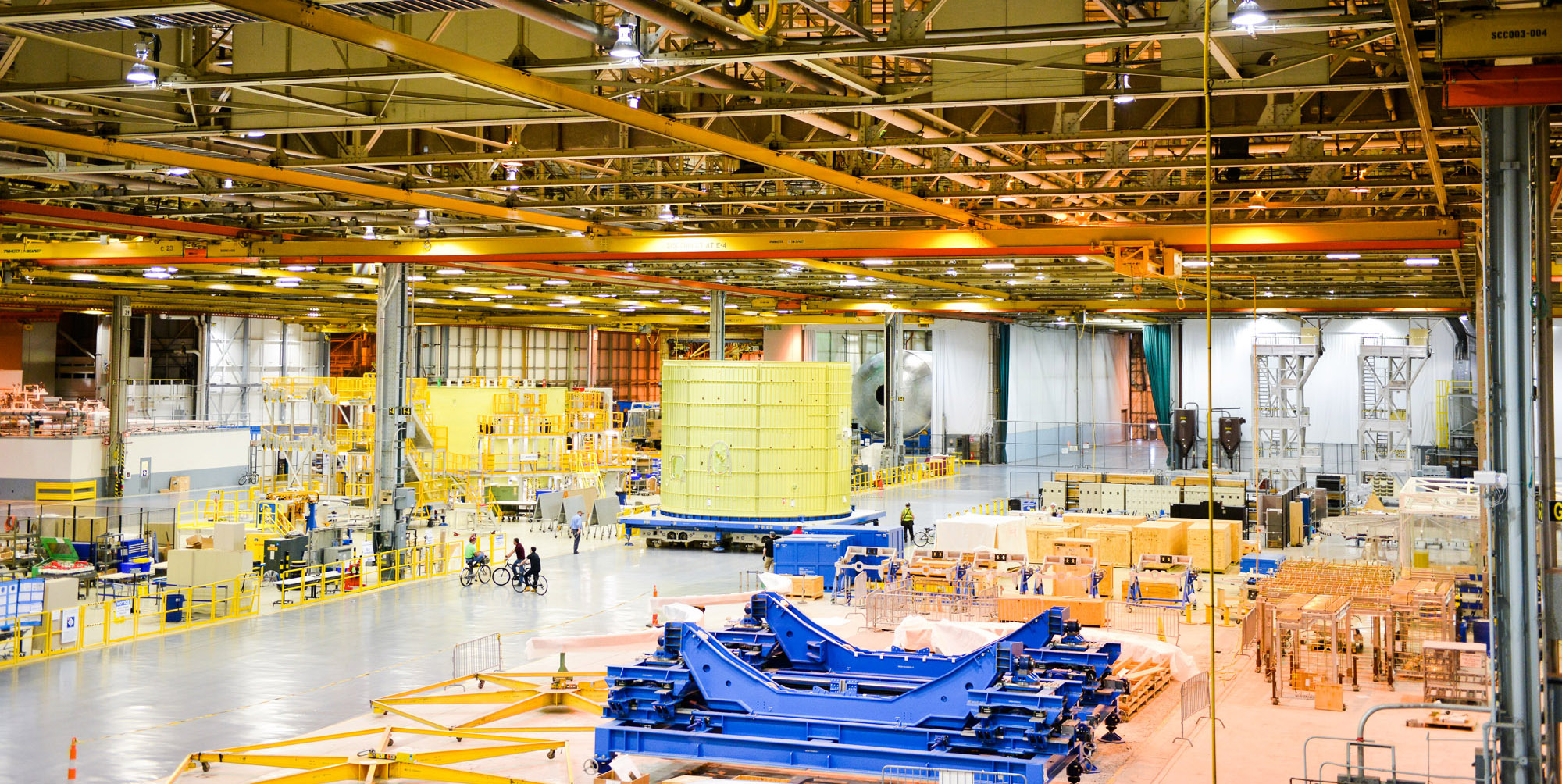
Space Launch System inter-tank section moving down the factory floor to the South VAB for vertical testing

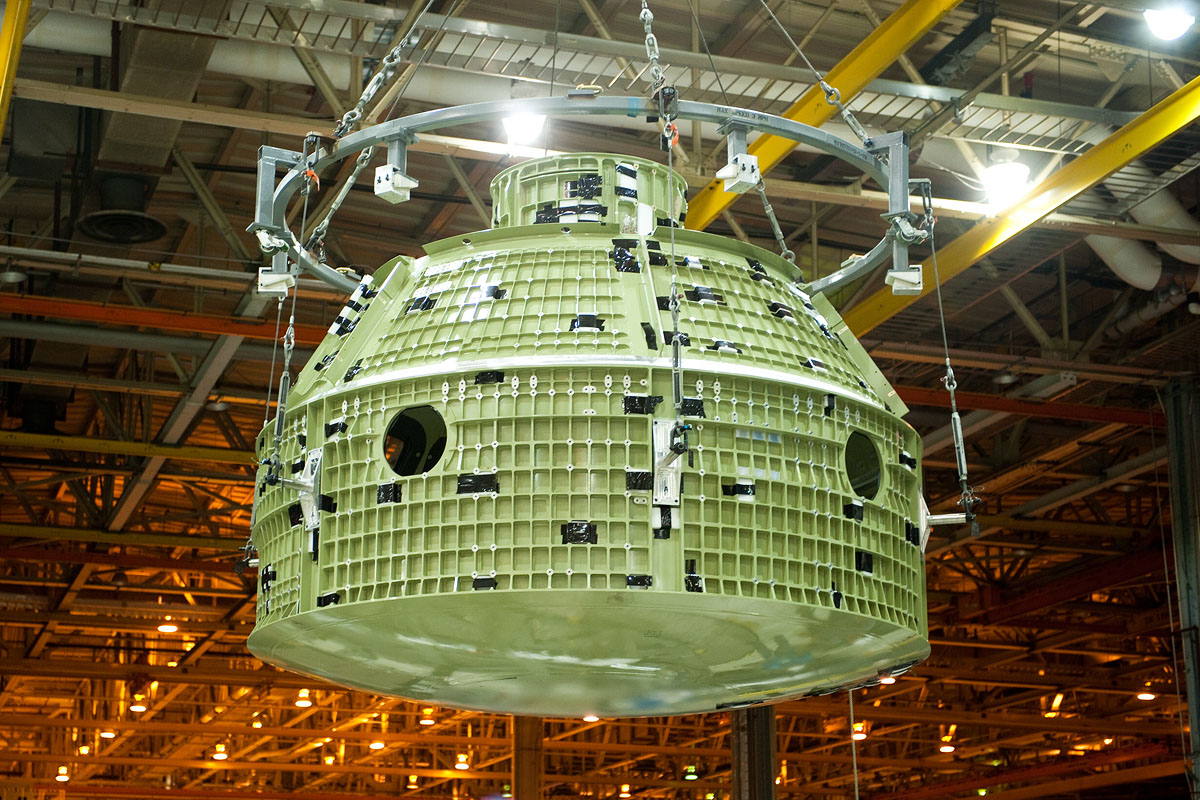
EFT-1 Orion after final weld on June 22, 2012, in the Main Manufacturing Building.

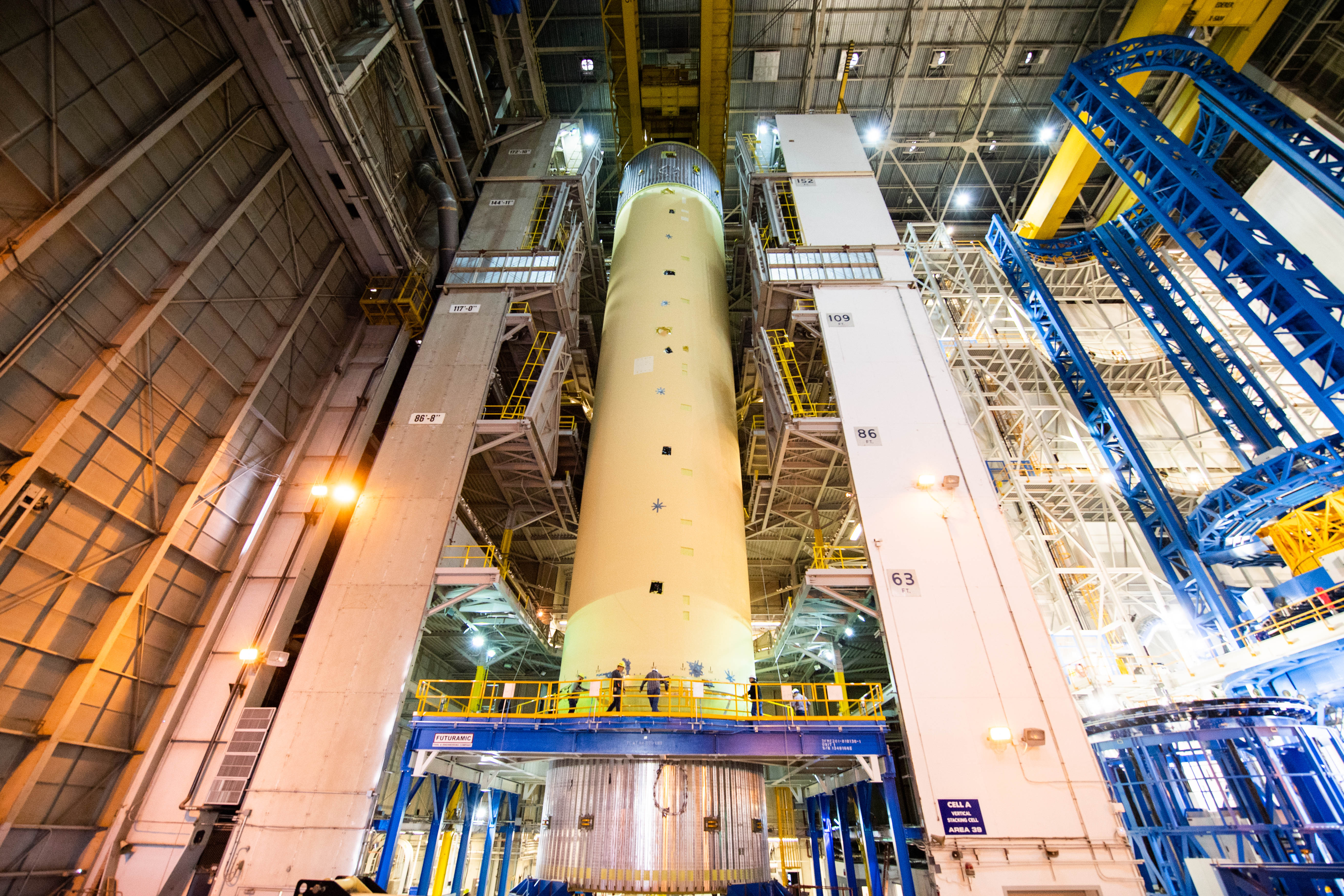
Final Assembly of the liquid hydrogen tank structural test article in the South VAB, December 2018

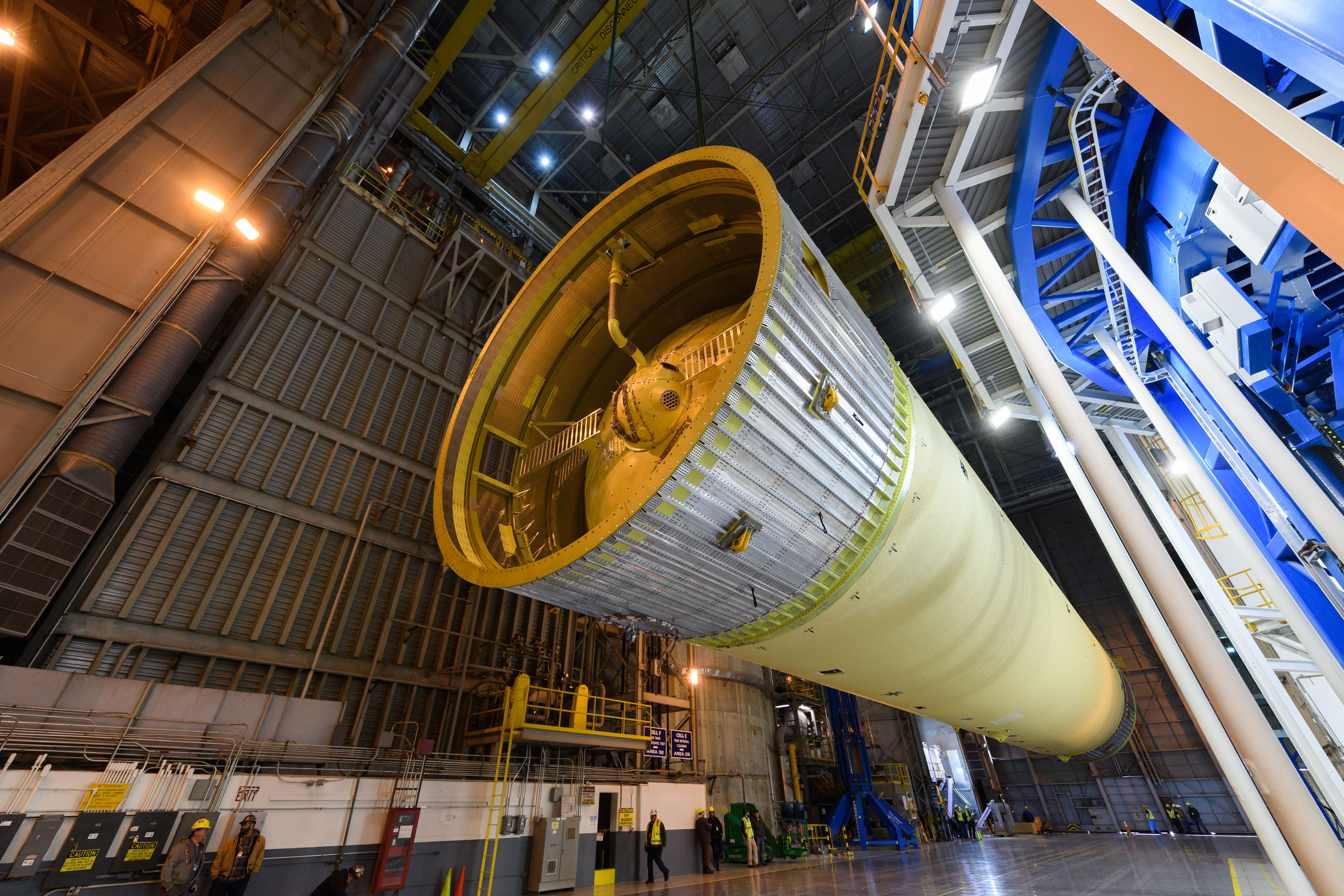
The completed SLS liquid hydrogen tank structural test article in the South Vertical Assembly Building, December 2018

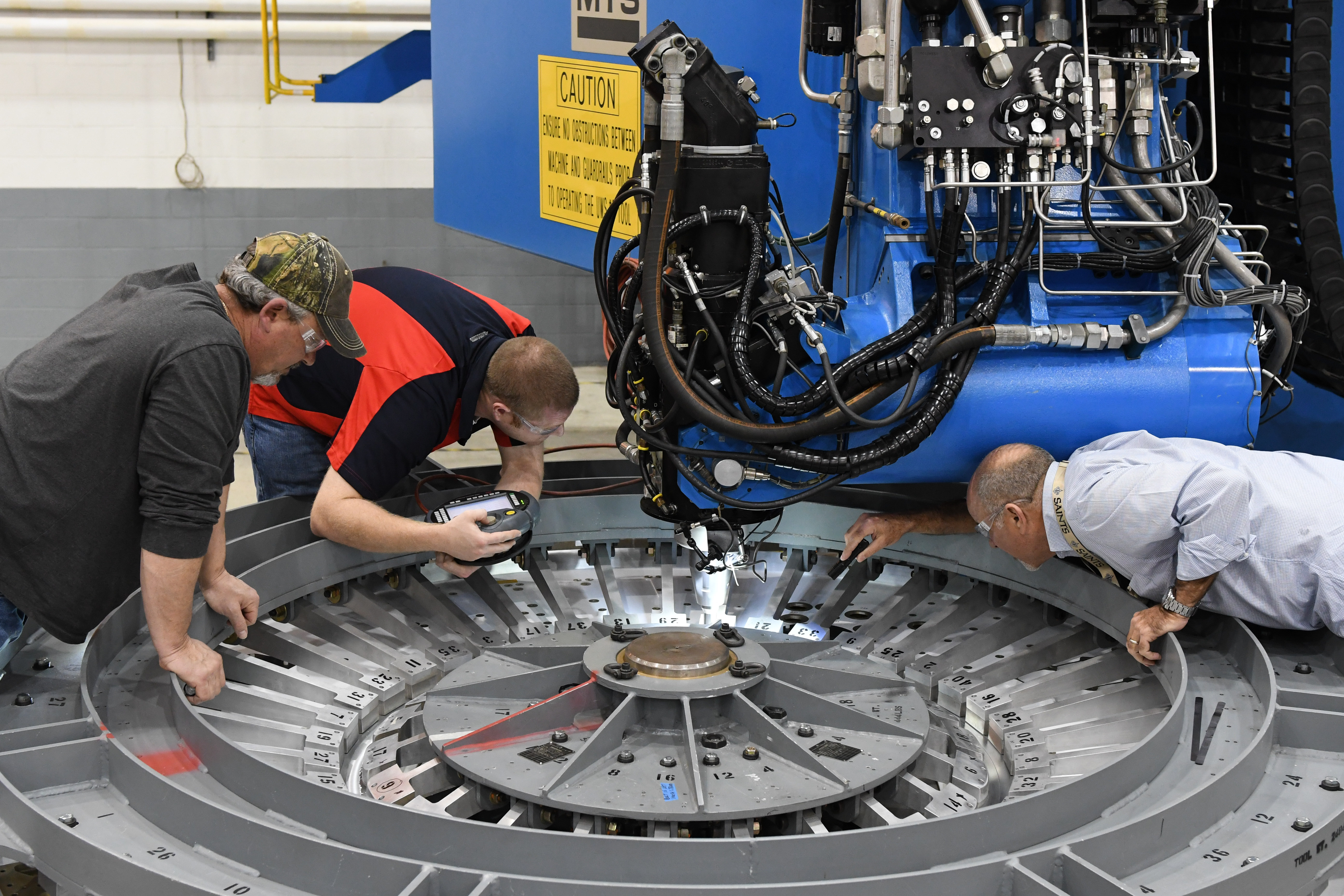
Factory workers welding the pressure vessel of the EM-2 Orion

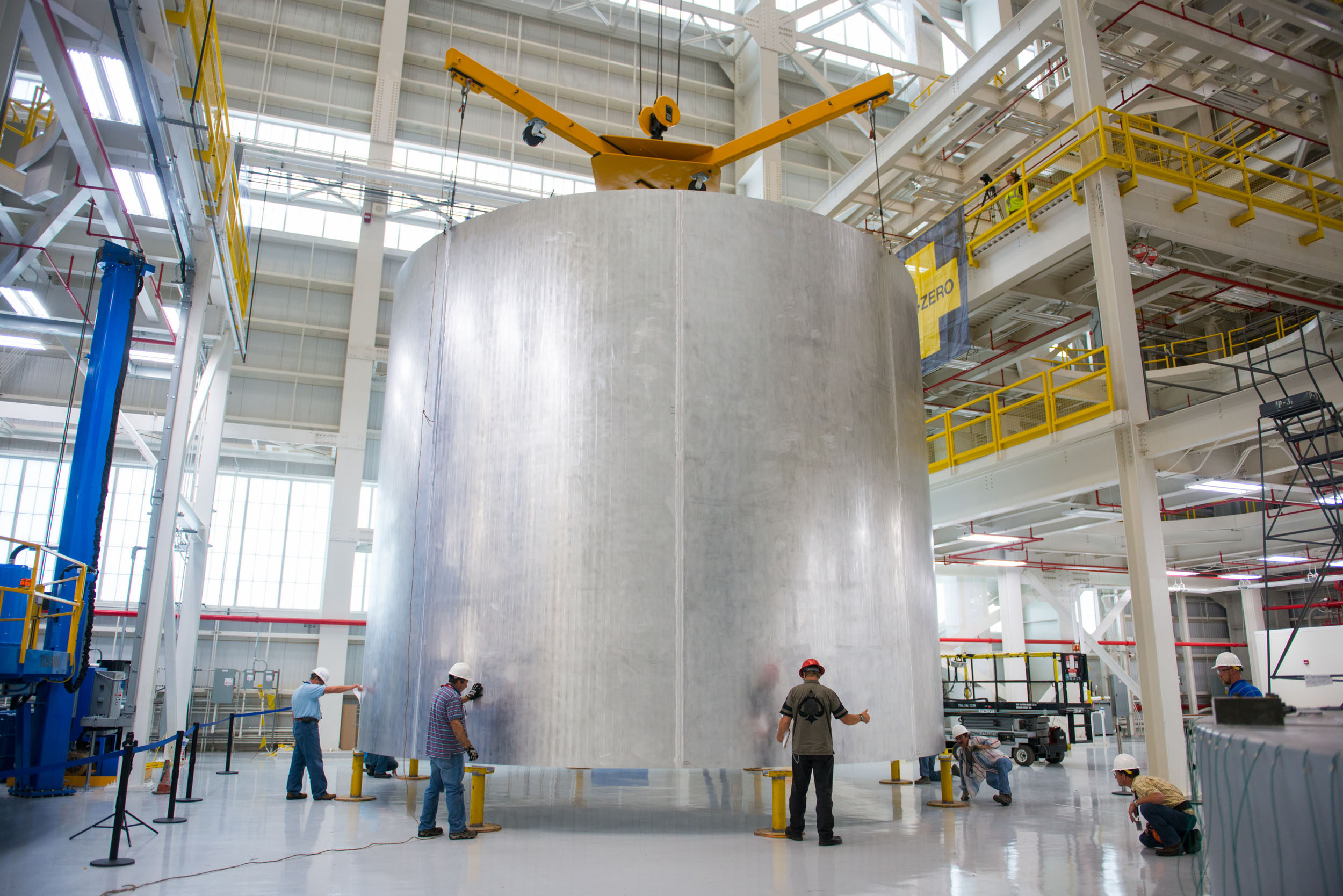
SLS barrel section in the North VAB

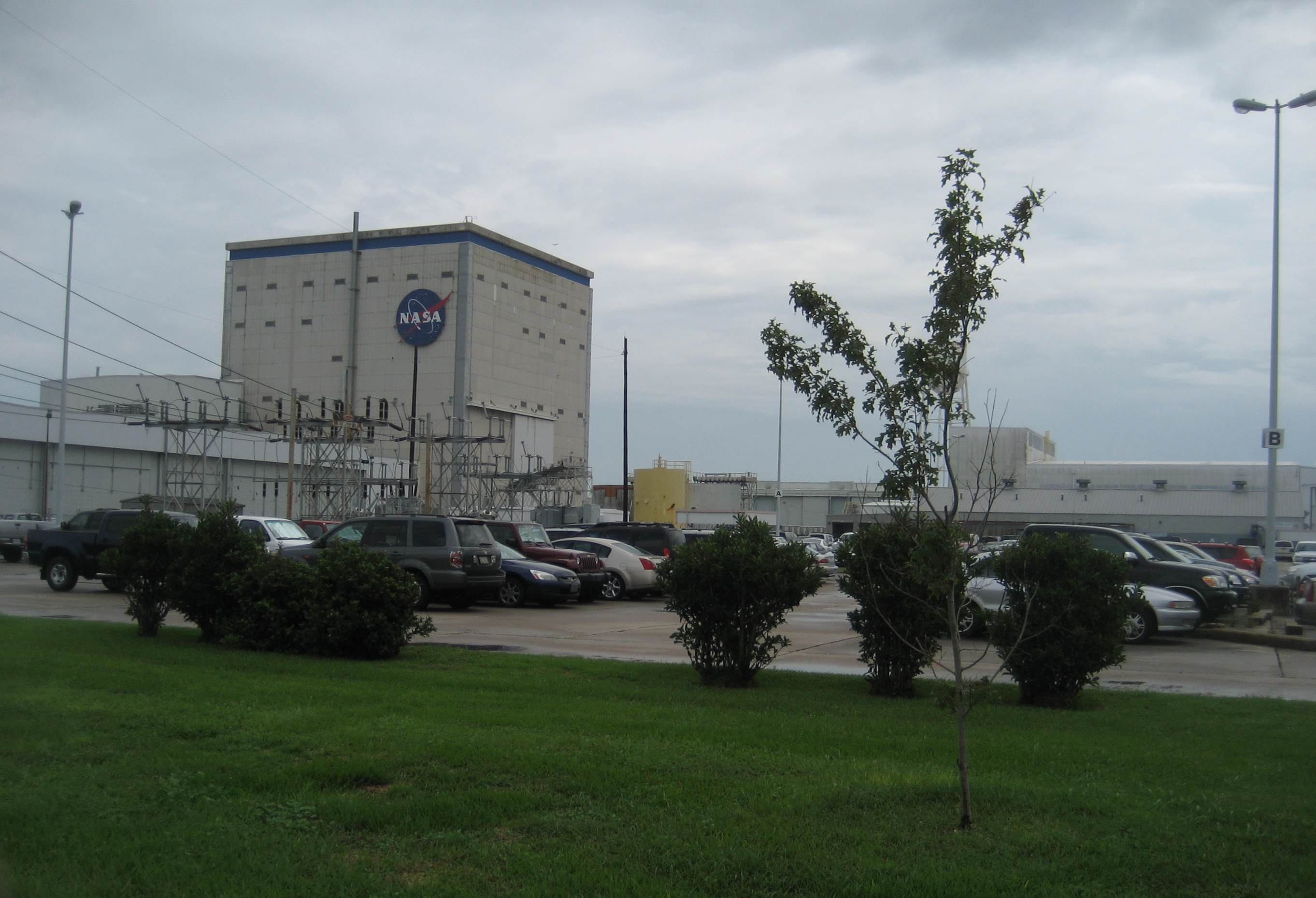
The South Vertical Assembly Building viewed from Gentilly Road. The electrical substation provides power for the factory's electric arc furnace

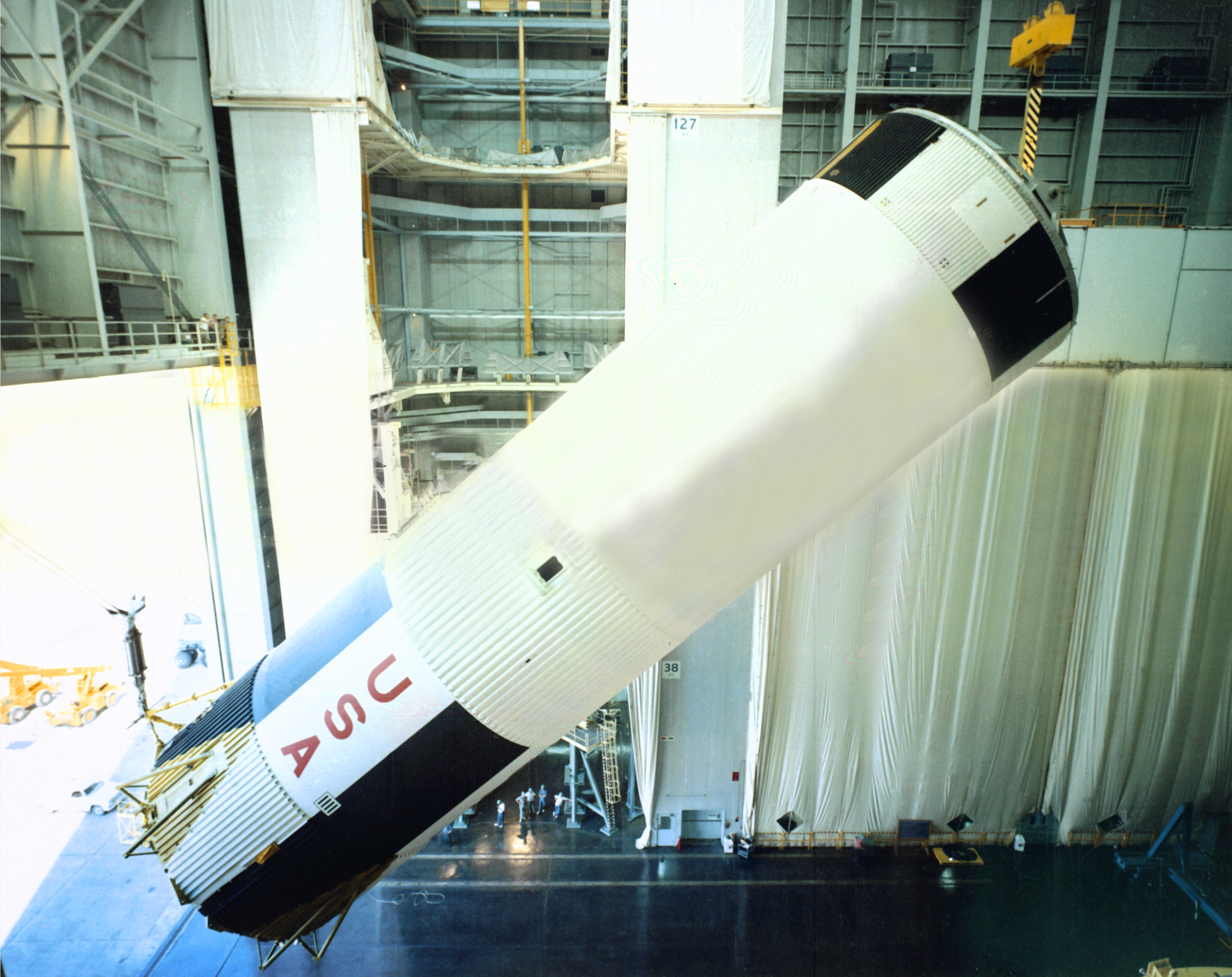
Saturn V S-IC stage vertical hoisting in the South VAB in 1967

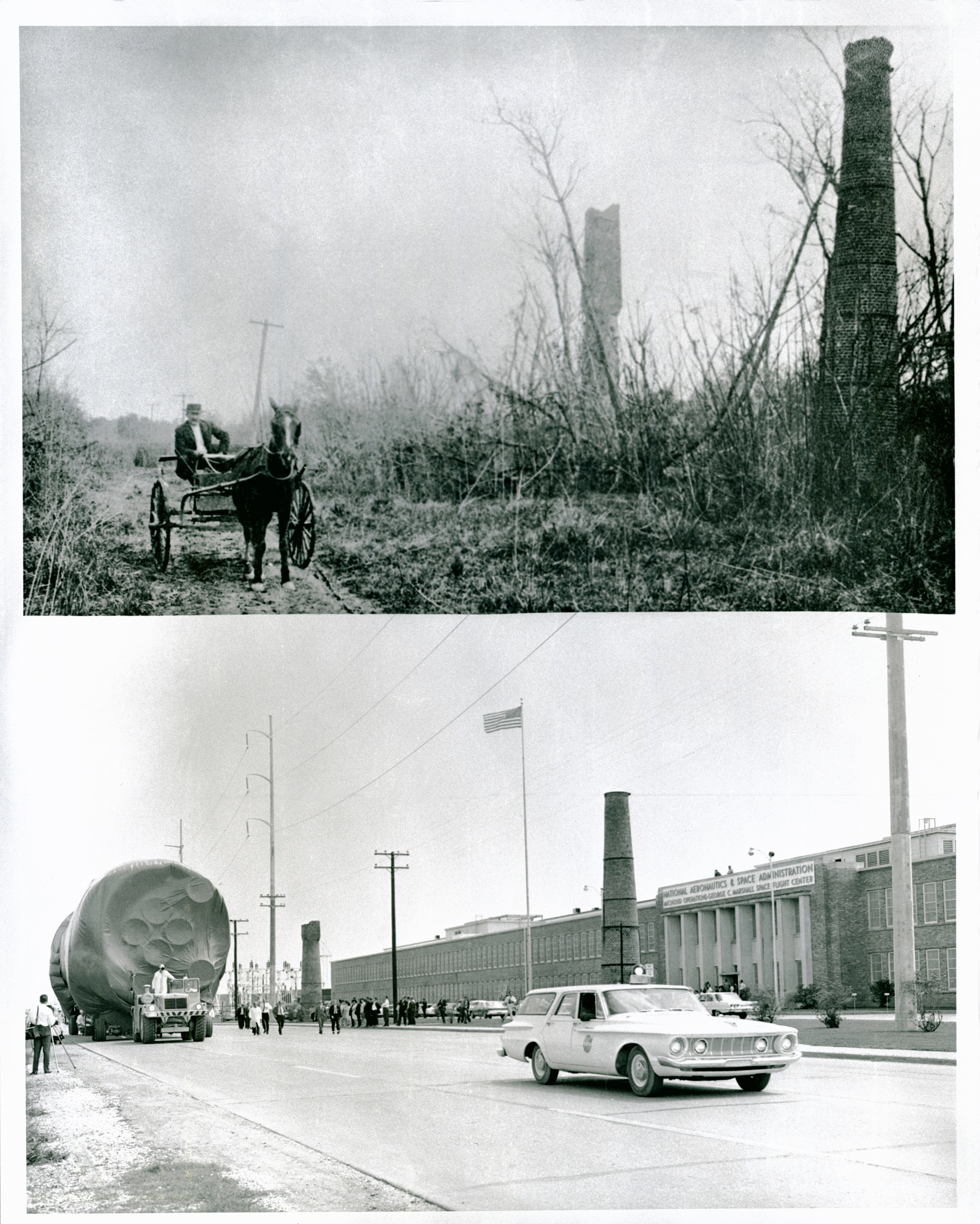
The site as seen in 1915 (showing the smokestacks of the old French sugar plantation) and the same area in 1966 (bottom picture) with the factory in the background.

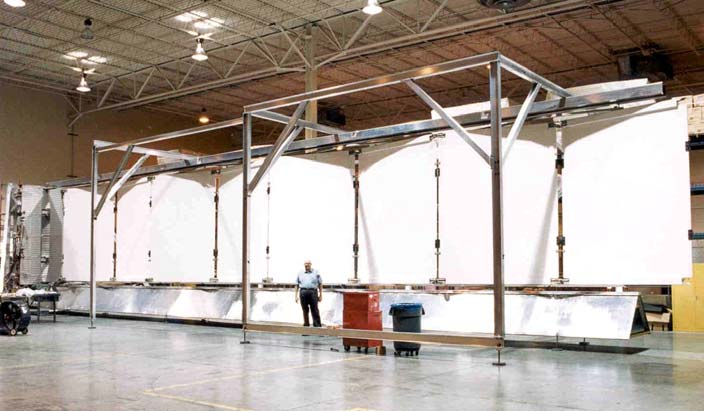
ISS radiator panels in a workshop

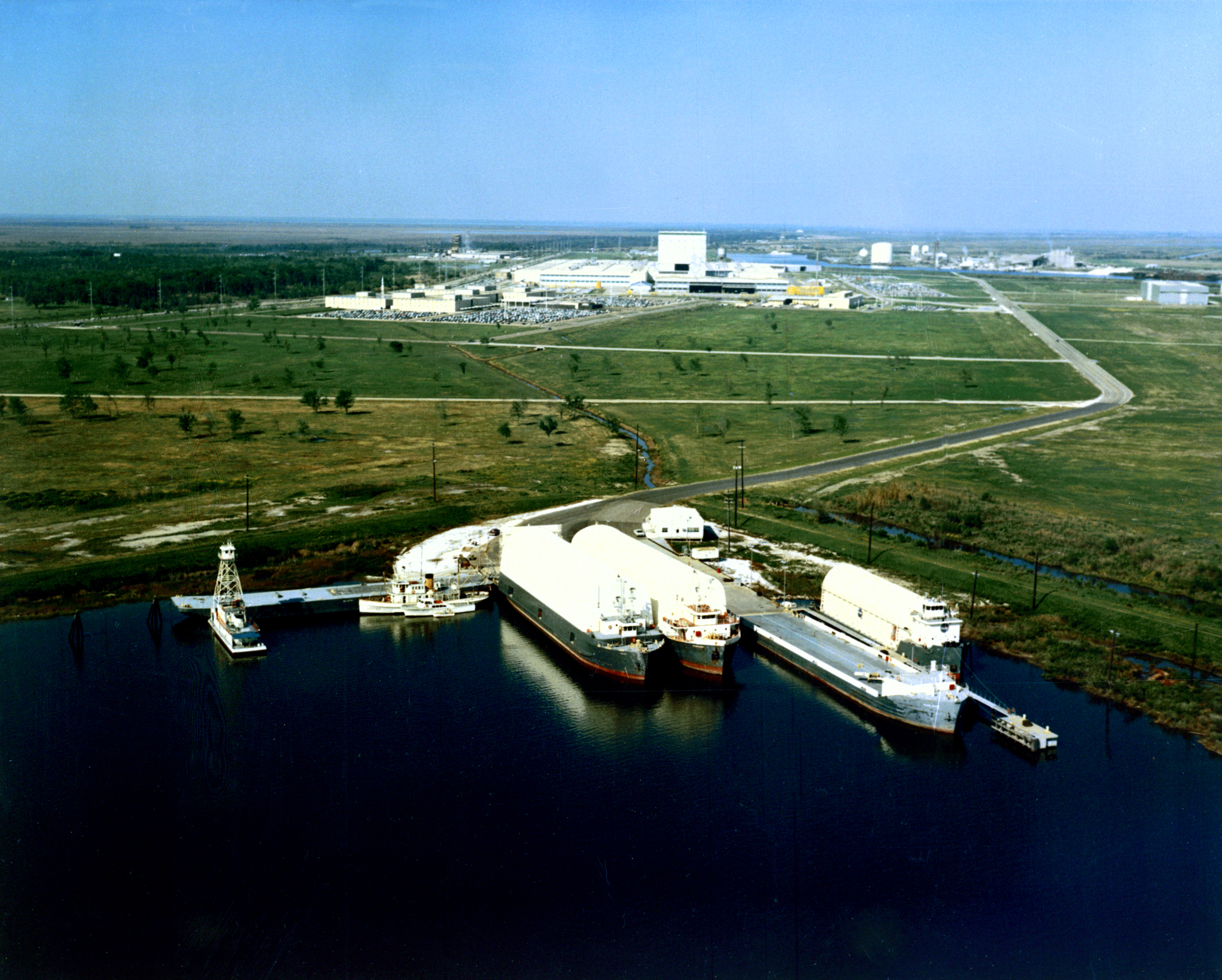
Barge shipping port 600m south of the factory complex

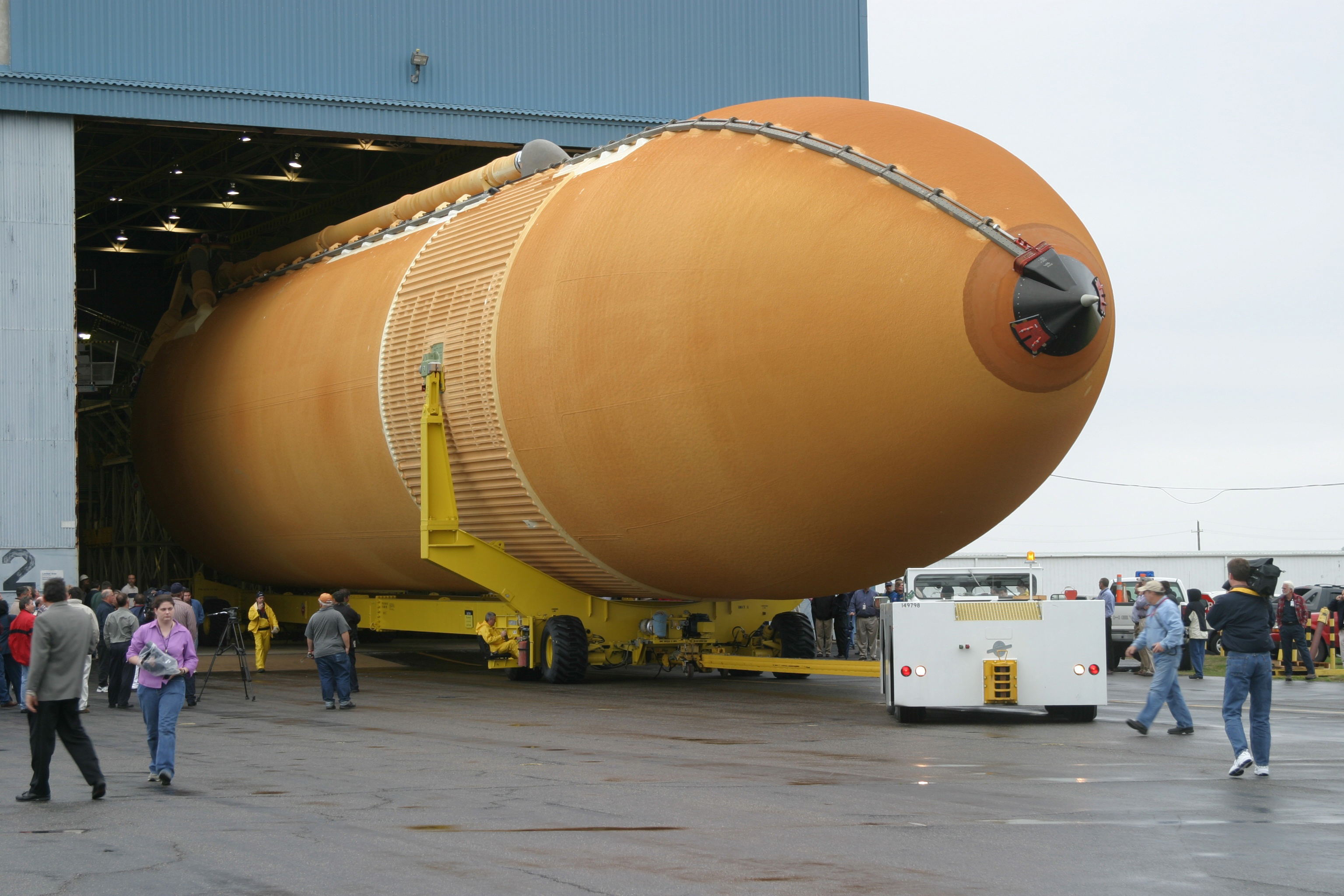
Space Shuttle External Tank being moved from Building Number 4

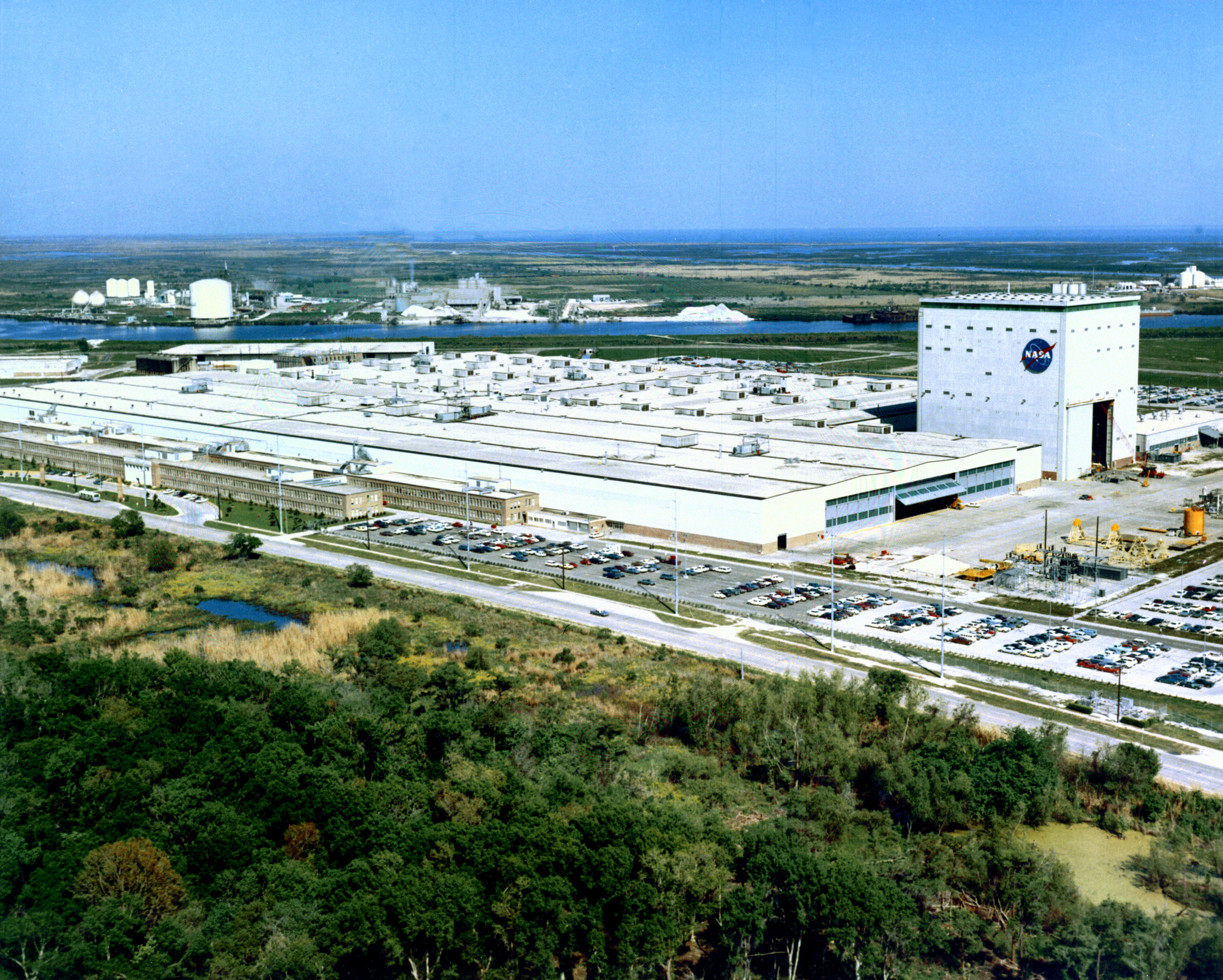
The factory complex in 1968

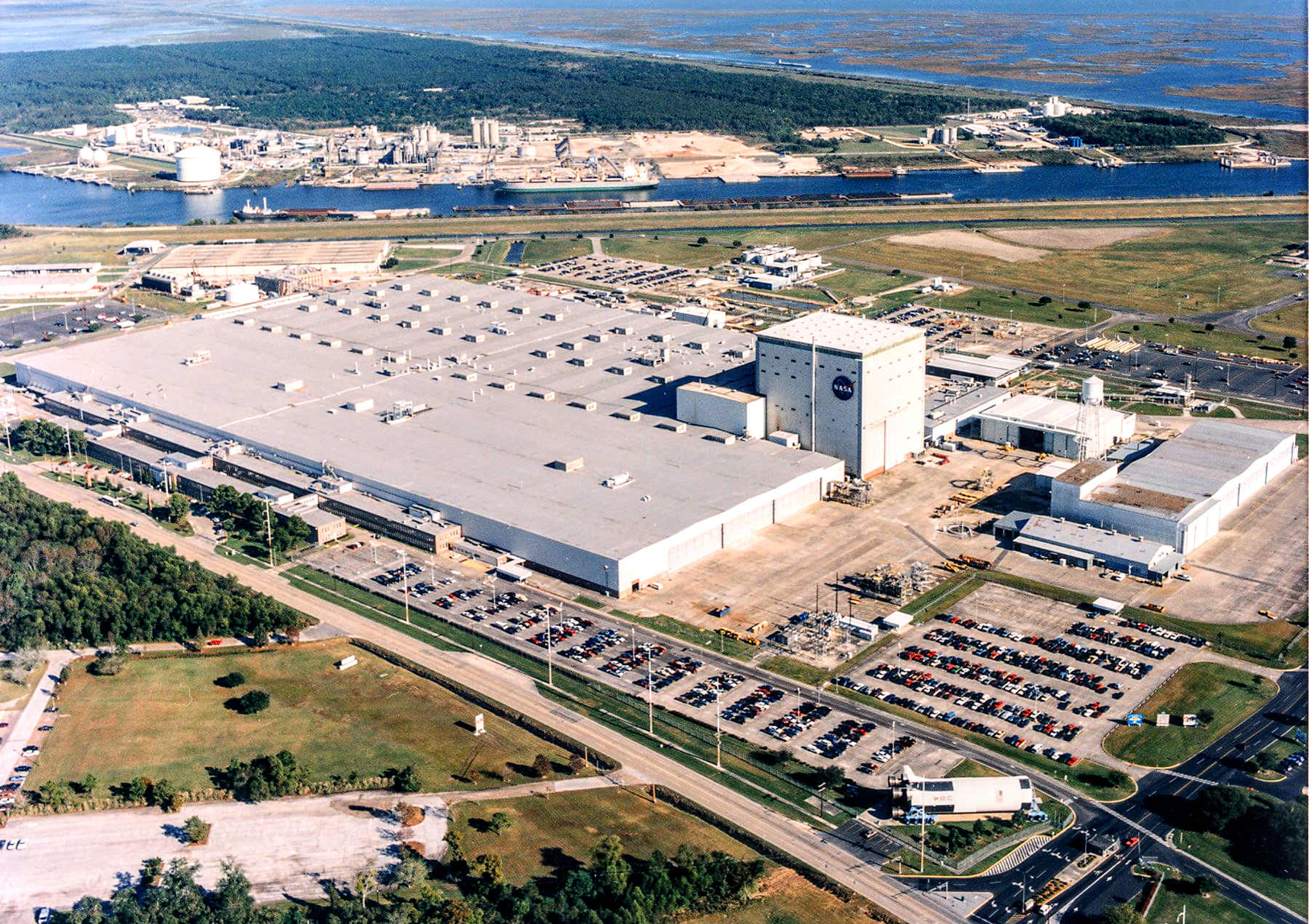
Aerial view, c. 1990

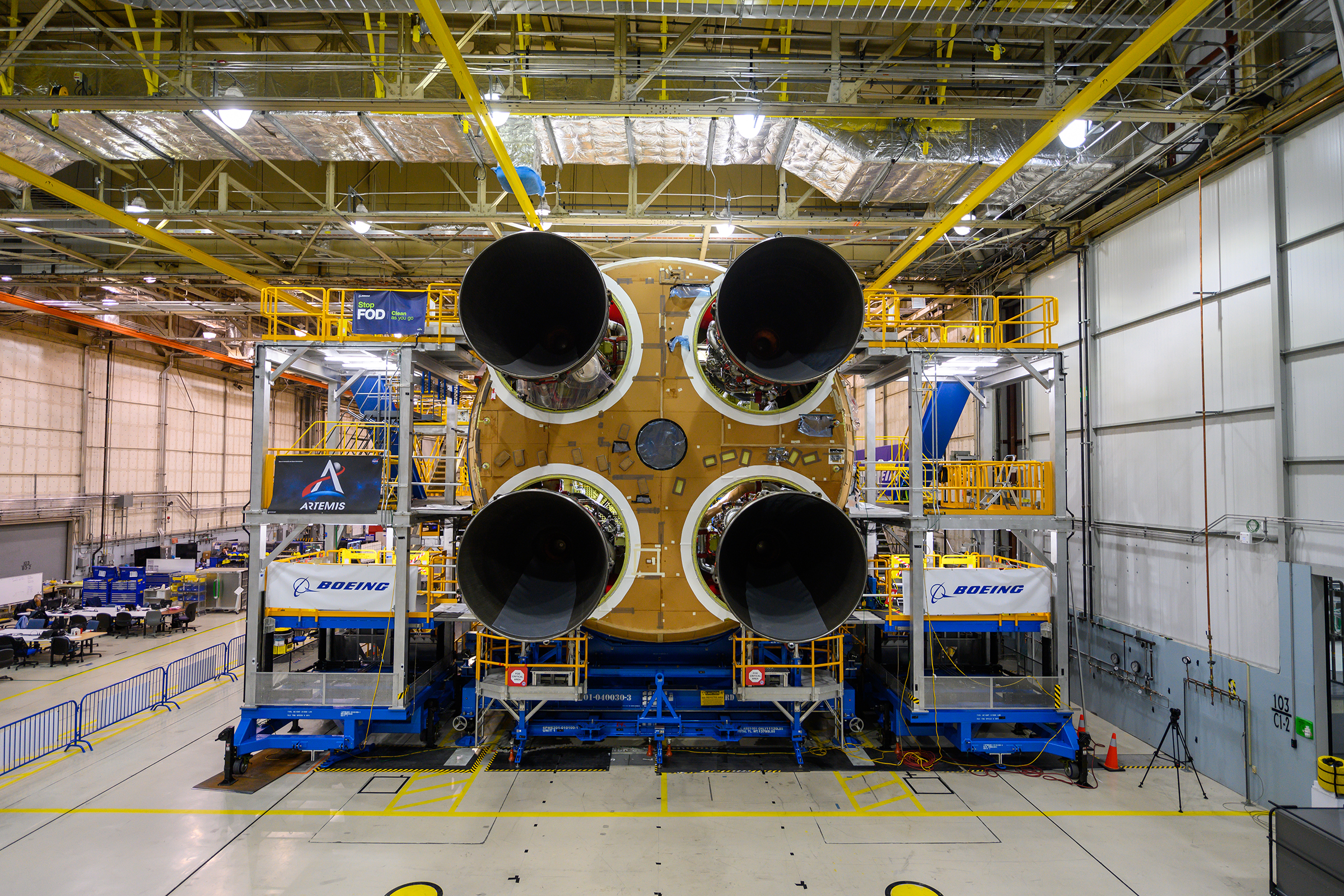
Completed SLS core stage for Artemis I.
