= National Finance Center =

USDA human resources and payroll accountants

Agency overview
- Formed: 1973; 53 years ago
- Jurisdiction: United States Department of Agriculture
- Headquarters: New Orleans, Louisiana
- Agency executives: Michael J. Jackson, Director; Angelique D. Dyer, Deputy Director
- Parent agency: USDA Office of the Chief Financial Officer
- Website: nfc.usda.gov

The National Finance Center (NFC) is a federal government agency division under the United States Department of Agriculture that provides human resources, financial and administrative services for agencies of the United States federal government. NFC's customer base is composed of more than 130 federal organizations, representing all three branches of the government.

NFC is a designated Shared Service Center provider under the Office of Personnel Management (OPM), Human Resources Line of Business initiative. NFC's HR system suite supports core system services such as payroll and personnel action processing, as well as related HR operational services such as recruitment and position classification.

- NFC operates an integrated payroll/personnel system.
- NFC operates the Centralized Enrollment Clearinghouse System (CLER) for the Office of Personnel Management (OPM). CLER reconciles records between federal payroll offices and Federal Employee Health Benefits providers.
- NFC operates the Direct Premium Remittance System (DPRS), which is used for billing and collecting health insurance premiums.

NFC was established in 1973 and is located in New Orleans. NFC is part of USDA's Office of the Chief Financial Officer. NFC provides many jobs to federal employees in the New Orleans office, which is located at NASA's Michoud Assembly Facility in New Orleans.
