= Norman C. Francis Parkway =

Street in New Orleans, Louisiana, US

- Former names: Jefferson Davis Parkway; Jeff Davis Parkway
- Namesake: Norman Francis
- Location: New Orleans, Louisiana, US
- From: Bayou St. John near Lafitte Greenway
- To: Martin Luther King, Jr. Boulevard in Gert Town

Norman C. Francis Parkway, formerly named Jefferson Davis Parkway or Jeff Davis Parkway, is a street in New Orleans, Louisiana, United States. It runs southwest from the head of Bayou St. John (near where it once joined to the Carondelet Canal, now the Lafitte Greenway) in the Mid-City neighborhood to Martin Luther King, Jr. Boulevard in the Gert Town neighborhood. Like most streets in New Orleans, the segment of the parkway to the north east of Canal Street is named "North" Norman C. Francis Parkway while the segment to the southwest is denoted as "South". The parkway is wide with a grassy median except for where it crosses over the Pontchartrain Expressway.

== History ==
The parkway was proposed in 1904 as a "speedway" connecting the city's two major public parks, Audubon Park and City Park. Part of the parkway was to be laid on Hagan Avenue which was named for John Hagan, a New Orleans merchant and land speculator who was in a real estate partnership with the Marquis de Lafayette. Fauburg Hagan, the area developed by Hagan in 1841, is a few blocks from Hagan Avenue and is now referred to as Tulane/Gravier.

In 1910, a 20-block portion of Hagan Avenue was renamed for Jefferson Davis, the president of the Confederate States of America who died in New Orleans in 1889. The remainder of Hagan Avenue continues to the northeast for eight more blocks parallel to Bayou St. John (one block east of Moss Street). In 1911, the Jefferson Davis Monument, a statue of Davis, was erected at the intersection of Jeff Davis Parkway and Canal Street. This statue, along with two other Confederate monuments, were removed by the City of New Orleans in 2017.

In August 2020, the city renamed the parkway for Norman Francis, former president of Xavier University of Louisiana, which is located near the southwestern end of the parkway.

== See also ==
- List of streets of New Orleans
