= Gert Town, New Orleans =

Gert Town
- Neighborhood
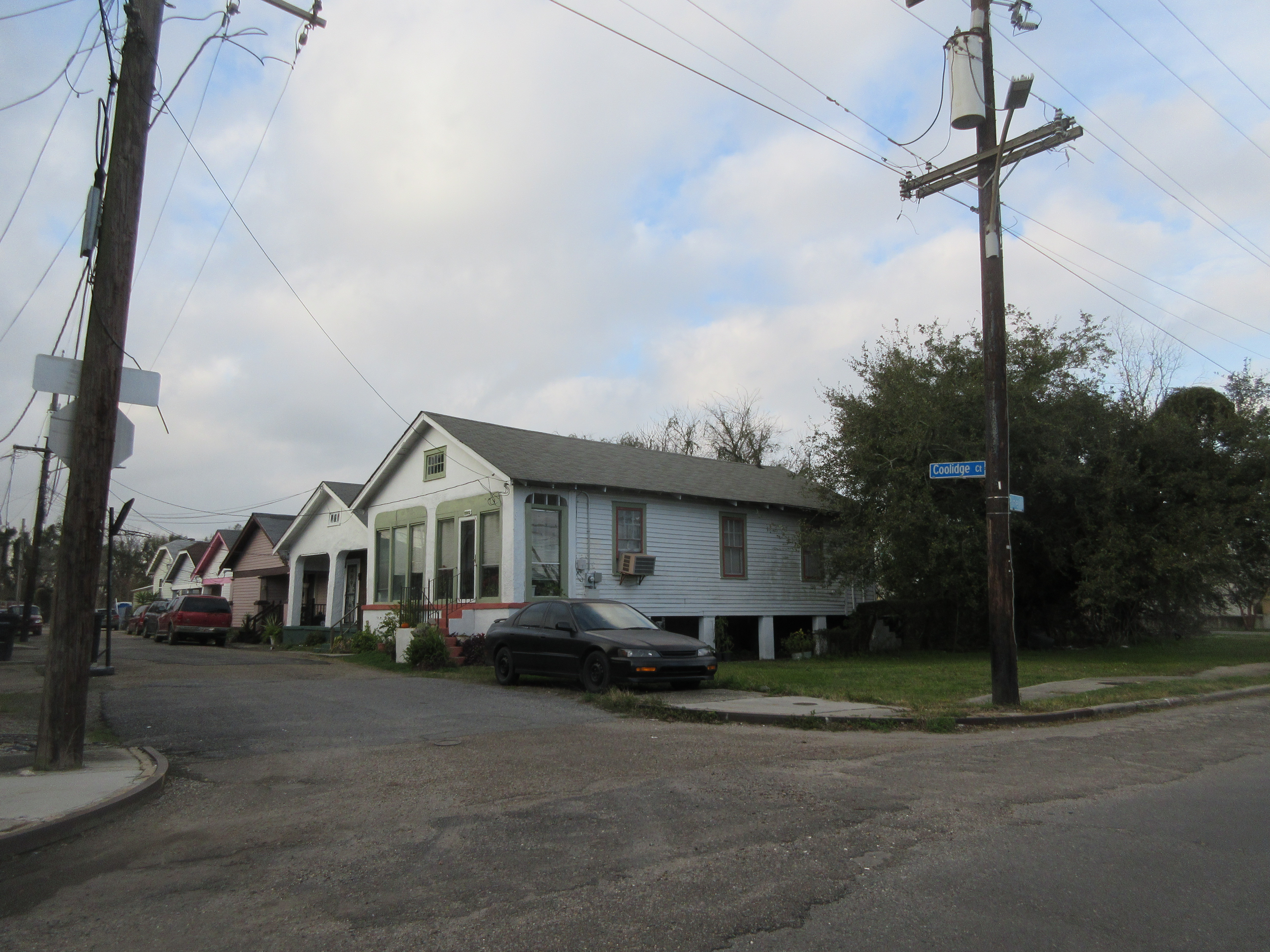
- Gert Town, New Orleans – Coolidge Court
- Interactive map of Gert Town
- Coordinates: 29°57′37″N 90°06′19″W
- Country: United States
- State: Louisiana
- City: New Orleans
- Planning District: District 4, Uptown District

Area
  - Total: 0.73 sq mi (1.9 km^{2})
  - Land: 0.73 sq mi (1.9 km^{2})
  - Water: 0.00 sq mi (0 km^{2})
- Elevation: 0 ft (0 m)

Population (2010)
  - Total: 1,545
  - Density: 2,100/sq mi (820/km^{2})
- Time zone: UTC-6 (CST)
  - Summer (DST): UTC-5 (CDT)
- ZIP Codes: 70125
- Area code: 504

Gert Town is a neighborhood in the city of New Orleans, Louisiana. It is the home to Xavier University of Louisiana and is near Mid-City. Gert Town played a major role in the industrial development of the New Orleans region. The Blue Plate Mayonnaise Factory, Coca-Cola Bottling Plant, Sealtest Dairy, and Thompson-Hayward Chemical Company were all fundamental manufacturing bases of the working-class neighborhood. Gert Town was also well known for being a center of development for jazz and other music genres. Musicians such as Buddy Bolden, John Robichaux, Merry Clayton, Bunk Johnson and Allen Toussaint all came from the neighborhood and helped shape the musical influence of New Orleans.

In 2016, Gert Town was named one of New Orleans' fastest-growing areas.

== History ==
The area now known as Gert Town was originally part of the Jeanne de McCarty plantation, which was purchased by the New Orleans Canal and Banking Company in the 1830s to extend the New Basin Canal. During this time much of the area was undeveloped and cut off from the rest of the city. Residential development was slow to take hold due to geographic challenges. For one, the early street pattern was the result of land development following the bends of the Mississippi River. For another, because it was a part of the swampy "Backatown" region, many streets stopped before entering the area. After some residential development at the end of the 19th century, the established Uptown streets running perpendicular to the river were extended into Gert Town and Mid-City. However, many of the streets in Gert Town remained unpaved well into the 20th century.

Gert Town did not start to establish independence as a neighborhood until the early 1900s when streetcars began running nearby. The development of Gert Town was also aided by the creation of Lincoln Park, a popular recreational spot for African Americans during the Jim Crow era. In the 1930s, the city widened surrounding streets such as Palmetto and North Claiborne, creating even greater access to the area.

During this growth period, the neighborhood became known as Gert Town. The commonly accepted explanation for the neighborhood's name is that it is a corruption of "Gehrke's Town." Gehrke's General Store, once located at the intersection of Carrollton and Colapissa, was a popular gathering place for locals because it had the area's only telephone.

=== Environmental Crisis ===
In 1931, one acre of land in Gert Town was purchased by the Thompson-Hayward chemical company. The facility opened a year later, producing wet pesticides and wet and dry herbicides. From 1931 to 1986, ownership changed twice. The land went from the Thompson-Hayward chemical company to the TH Agriculture and Nutrition Company and finally to Harcos Chemicals, Inc. This plot of land went from housing wet pesticides and herbicides to only dry products to storing chemicals and several cleaning supplies.

The chemical factory provided jobs despite the odor and dust. As the years progressed, the factory was told to cease production and the release of chemicals to the outside, by the Louisiana Department of Environmental Quality (DEQ). The building was then torn down, but the toxic chemicals had seeped into the bricks and had escaped through water systems and air ventilation. The resulting pollution caused many people to develop several symptoms from minor headaches to death. This angered many people, and they filed a lawsuit. In the settlement, the defendants agreed to pay $51.575 million into a single fund that would compensate the plaintiffs. Like the majority of the city, Gert Town flooded from the levee failures in the aftermath of Hurricane Katrina in 2005. Except for a few sections along major thoroughfares like Carrollton Avenue and Norman C. Francis Parkway, recovery remained slow five years later.

== Geography ==
According to the United States Census Bureau, Gert Town has a total area of 0.73 square miles (1.9 km^{2}), all land. The neighborhood is bordered by several other neighborhoods including Holly Grove, Mid-City, Fontainebleau, and Gravier.

Today Gert Town is located in the center of New Orleans. Gert Town's streets run parallel to the Mississippi River, causing the streets to curve and wind. The New Orleans City Planning Commission defines the boundaries of Gert Town as these streets: Palmetto Street, South Carrollton Avenue, the Pontchartrain Expressway, South Broad Street, MLK Boulevard, Washington Avenue, Eve Street, Norman C. Francis Parkway, Earhart Boulevard, Broadway Street, Colapissa Street, Fig Street, Cambronne Street, Forshey Street, Joliet Street, and Edinburgh Street.

=== Vertical Migration ===
Gert Town is one of the points of lowest elevation in New Orleans, currently ranging from 0 to −4 meters below sea level. According to geographer Richard Campanella, "vertical migration" patterns, based on topographical elevation, appeared to have a specific effect from 1920 to 2000 in New Orleans. There is no evidence suggesting that race was a factor of the vertical migration pattern, but as time went on, New Orleanians appeared to move from areas of higher elevation to lower elevation. Between the years 1920 and 1930, areas of low elevation such as Gentilly, Lakeview, and especially Gert Town experienced great increases in population, while areas of high elevation, such as Marigny, Treme, and Lee Circle, experienced decreases in residential populations. The above-sea-level population in New Orleans decreased from approximately 90 percent in the early 20th century to approximately 38 percent in the start of the 21st century. Following Hurricane Katrina, there was an increased percentage of the New Orleans population living at higher elevations, but it was more so due to slow re-population of more drastically affected low-elevation areas as opposed to a social preference for high elevation living.

=== Landmarks ===
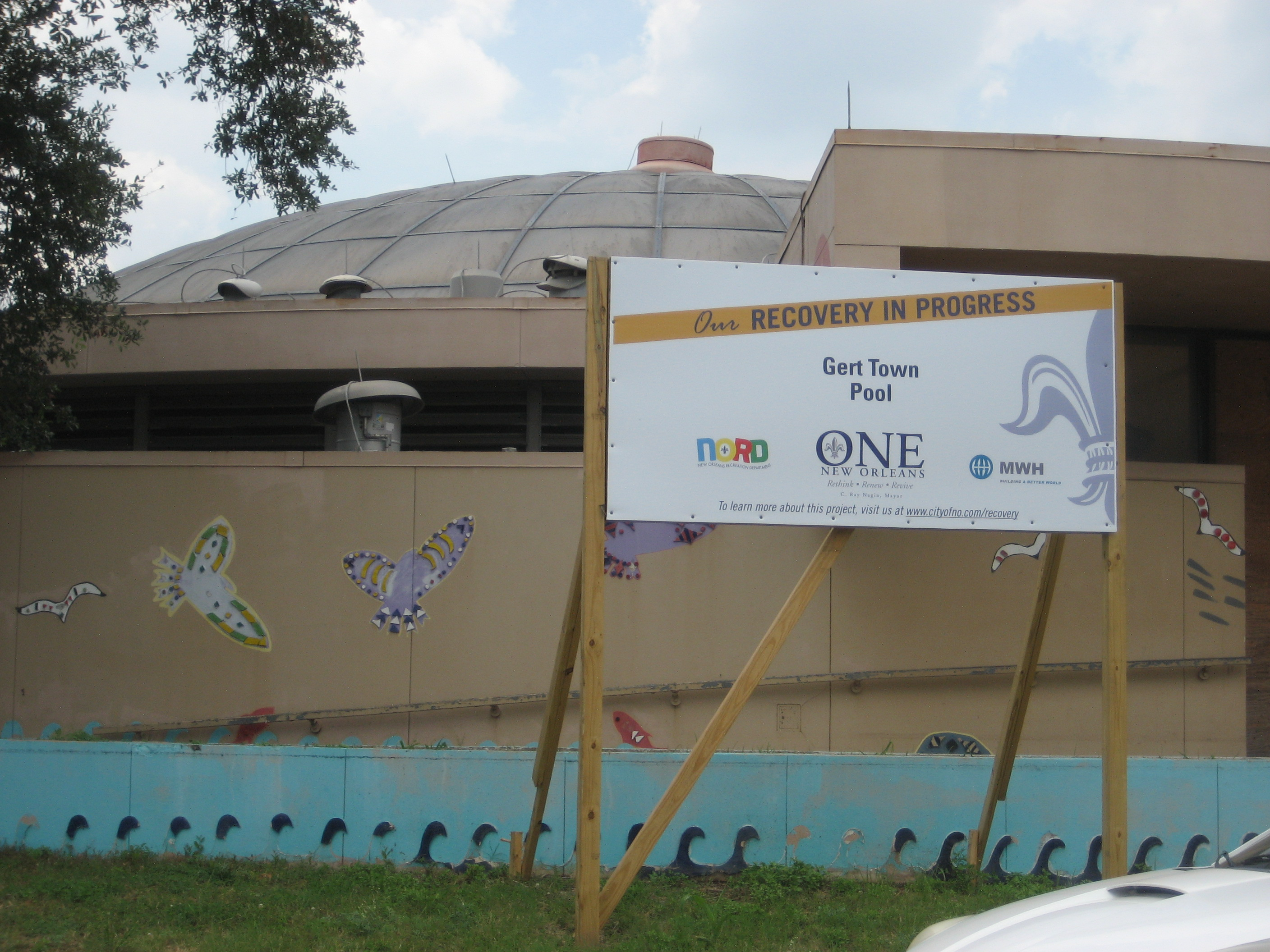
TheGert Town Natatorium was closed after damage by Hurricane Katrina in 2005 and demolished by the city in 2007.

Xavier University of Louisiana is located in the northern corner of the neighborhood, while a commercial strip lies along the section of Carrollton Avenue that runs through the neighborhood. In the 1990s, a portion of the facade of the Sealtest Dairy building was preserved and incorporated into a new post office. Other small businesses are scattered along Washington Avenue; until Hurricane Katrina, one of them was Ultrasonic Studios.

In the mid-20th century, a manufacturing district developed around the then-named Jefferson Davis Boulevard, including the local Coca-Cola bottling plant and the Art Deco landmark Blue Plate Mayonnaise factory. In the late 20th century, manufacturing in this area declined and largely ended after the post-Katrina flooding. The businesses along Norman C. Francis Parkway that have succeeded in rebuilding include the studios of television station WVUE.

Other neighborhood landmarks included the Gert Town Pool, a public swimming pool in a domed structure run by the New Orleans Recreation Department. The Gert Town Pool was demolished by Mayor Mitch Landrieu's administration, for Xavier University, to eventually make way for a tennis court.

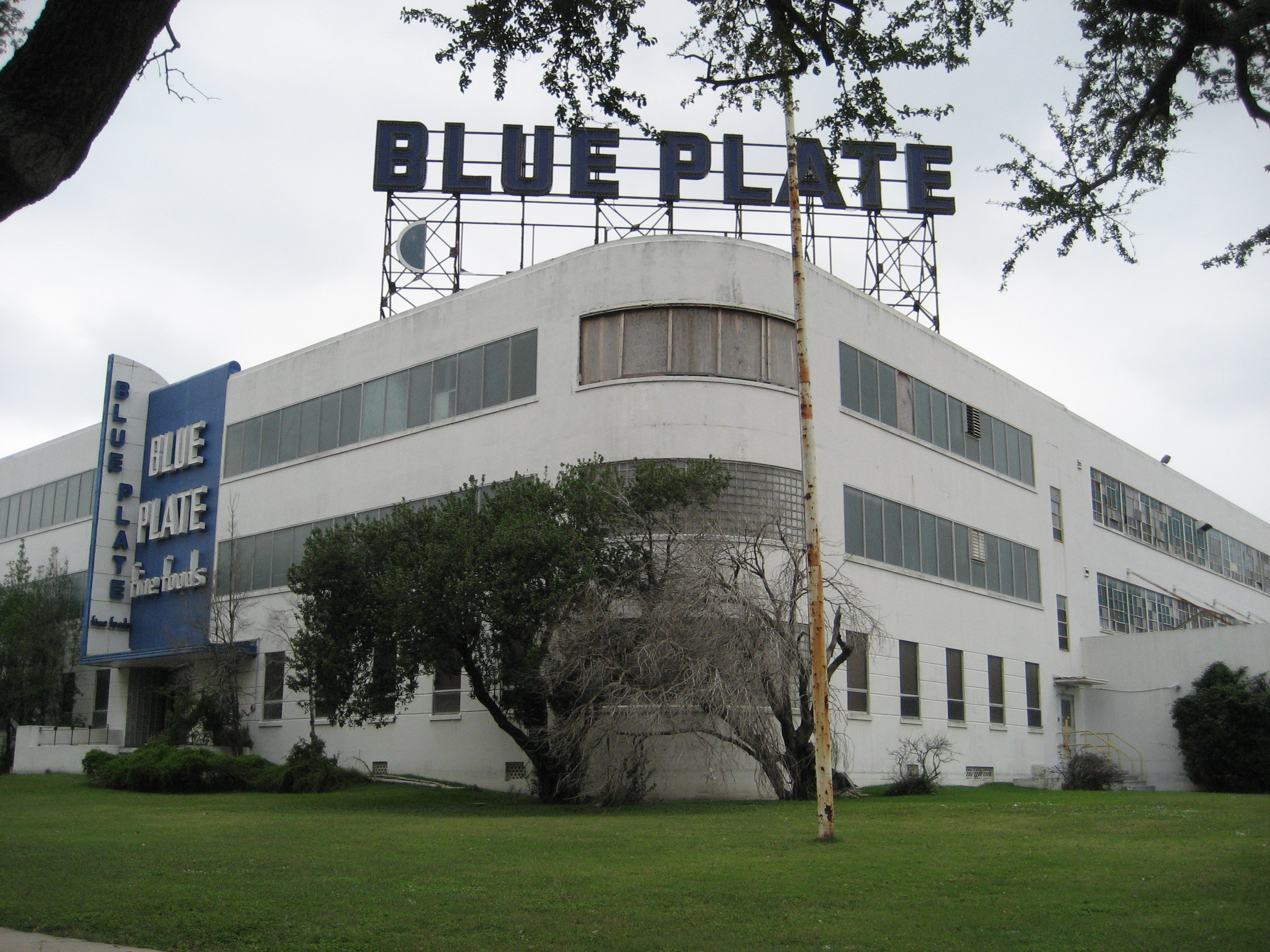
The Blue Plate Mayonnaise factory in 2007, after the complex was closed for production.

==== Blue Plate Mayonnaise Factory ====
The Blue Plate Mayonnaise Factory is now known as the Blue Plate Artist Lofts. Blue Plate was one of the primary mayonnaise manufacturers in the country. Blue Plate mayonnaise was originally produced in the city of Gretna, Louisiana, until production was moved to 1315 S Jefferson Davis Parkway in the small Gert Town neighborhood in 1941. Some people believe that the production of the mayonnaise came to a halt because of Hurricane Katrina, but the factory stopped producing Blue Plate mayonnaise in 2000. Reily Foods Company, which owned the brand, found a more up-to-date factory in Tennessee. Although the building suffered some damage in the hurricane, and was shut down, its historic architecture has been replenished.

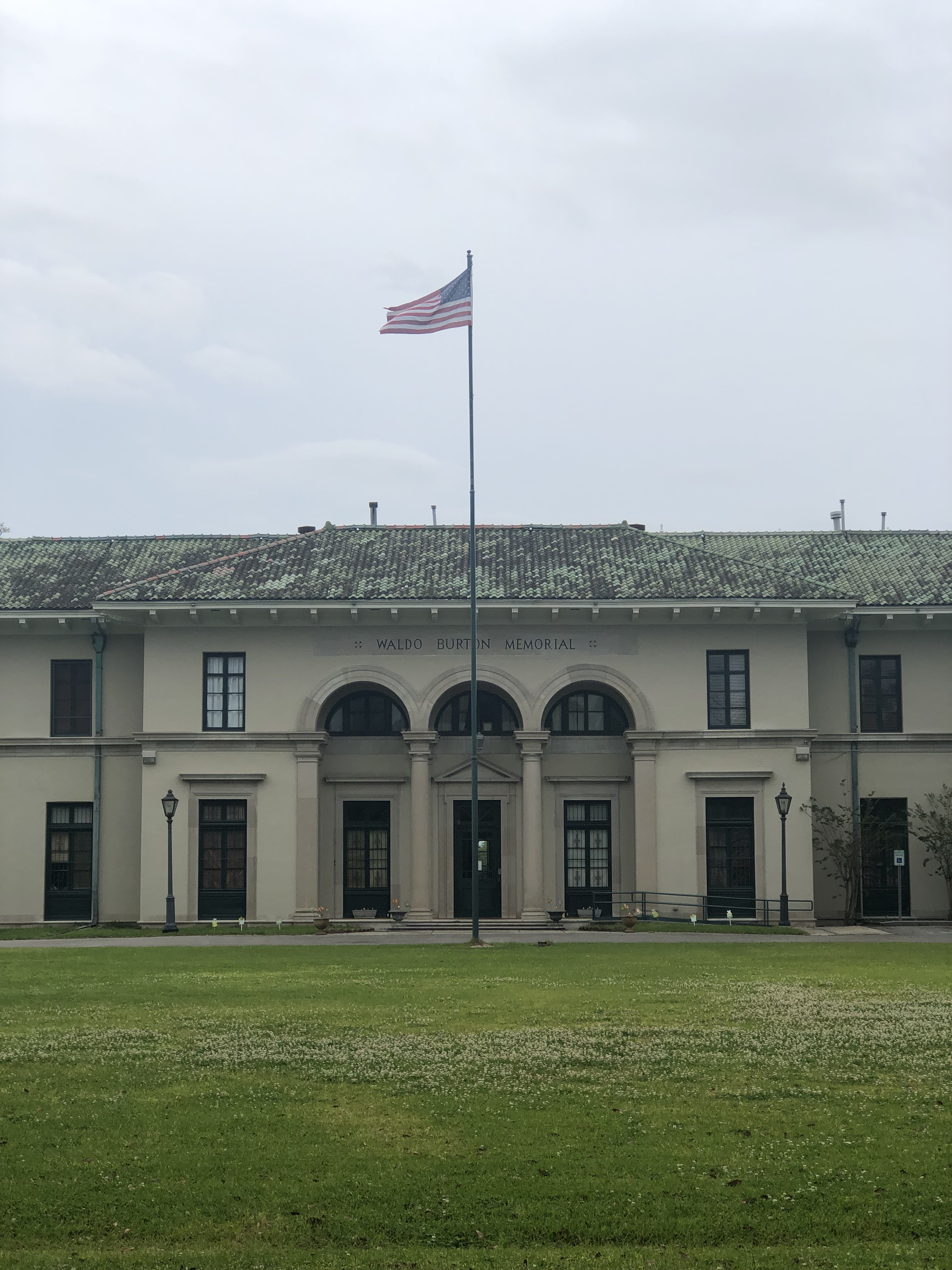
The Waldo Burton Memorial Home for Boys, 2019

==== Waldo Burton Memorial Boy's Home ====
The Waldo Burton Memorial Boys Home is located on 3320 S Carrollton Avenue, very close to the campus of Xavier University of Louisiana. It was built in 1918 by William L. Burton, who named the home after his son William Waldo Burton. This home was an orphanage for young boys from the 1920s until the 21st century. There were many names for the home, including the Orphan Boys Asylum and the Asylum for the Relief of Destitute Orphan Boys.

The building, still standing, is now a retirement home for the elderly, surrounded by trees and much nightlife, despite Hurricane Katrina and other natural disasters that hit Gert Town. Currently, it provides community services to the elderly whenever high school or college students apply to help.

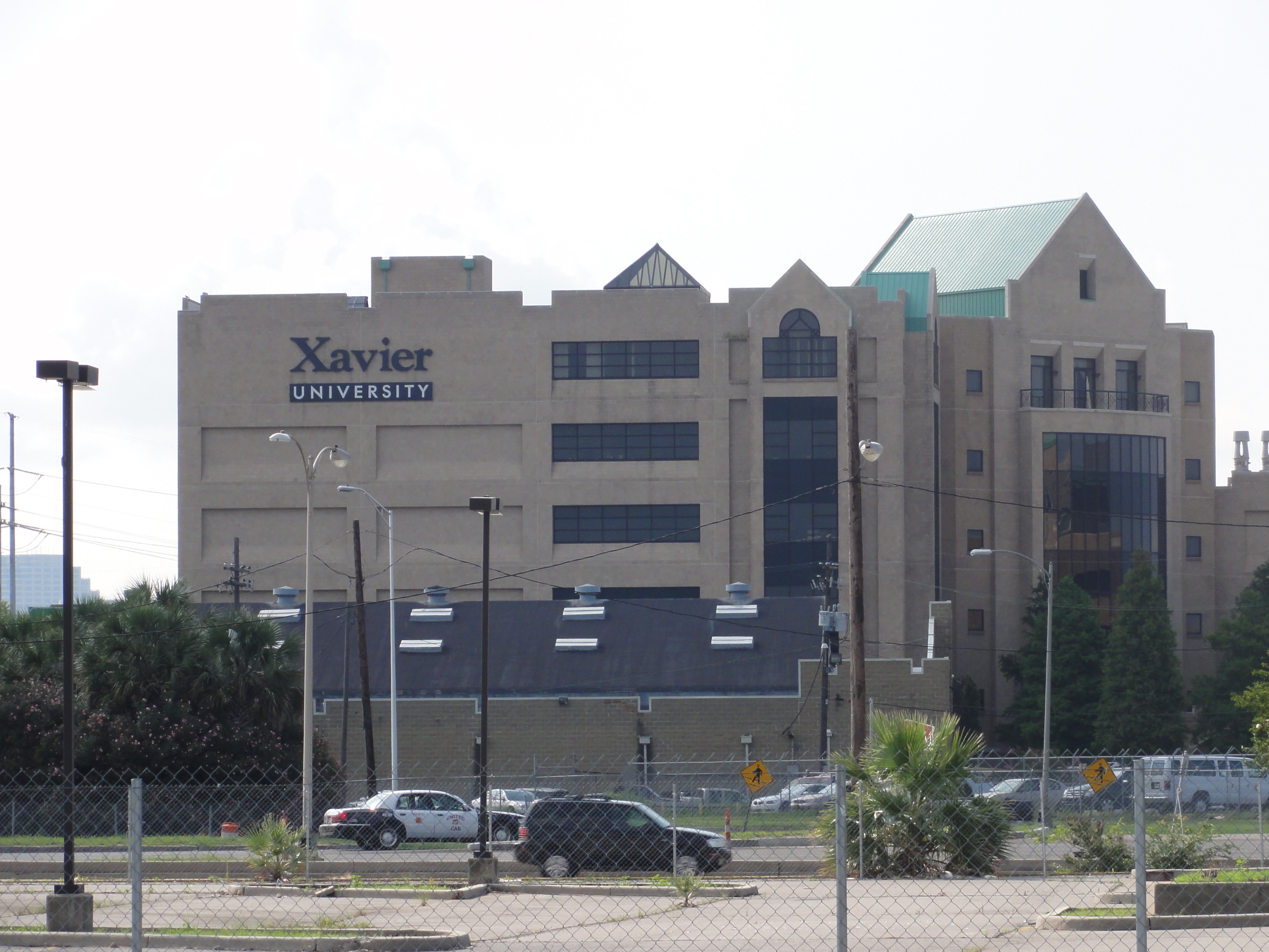
Xavier University, New Orleans. The university's former gymnasium known as "The Barn" is in the foreground. The gymnasium stood on the Xavier campus from 1937 until 2013. The multi-story building in the distance is the Xavier University of Louisiana Library.

==== Xavier University of Louisiana ====
Gert Town's most prominent landmark is Xavier University of Louisiana, which was established in 1925 and is the nation's only historically black Catholic university. Xavier was founded by St. Kathrine Drexel, an educator and philanthropist.

In August 2005, Hurricane Katrina, a category 5 storm, hit Louisiana leaving Xavier under six feet of water. The hurricane decimated Xavier's student enrollment, which decreased from 4,100 students to 3,000 students. The campus was flooded with water for two weeks. It took nearly five months and $80 million of federal funds and private donations to reconstruct the campus. Important buildings such as the Norman C. Francis Academic Science Complex and the University Center were partly demolished in order to repair them. Xavier University reopened in January 2006.

== Demographics ==
Racial & Ethnic Diversity of Gert Town
Ethnicity	2000	2012–2016
African American	94.5%	68.90%
White	2.9%	19.20%
Asian	.5%	2.10%
American Indian	.0%	0.10%
Multiple Races	.6%	2.8%
Hispanic	1.3%	6.8%

As of the census of 2010, there were 3,614 people, 1,060 households, and 564 families residing in the neighborhood, a decrease from the numbers in the neighborhood prior to Hurricane Katrina. The population of people who lived in the Gert Town area in the year of 2000, pre-Katrina, was 4,748 people. Between the years of 2012 and 2016, the population was 4,221.

=== Crime ===
Although the overall crime rate in Gert Town remains slightly high, crime has decreased significantly in the area due to ongoing gentrification. From the 1970s to 2005, violent crimes such as robberies and murders were problematic for the area. In a 1994 article, Richard Woodbury of Time described Gert Town as being filled with ramshackle cottages and abandoned apartments. Woodbury stated "crack deals were made as children played amid broken glass and litter. As night fell, residents retreated behind double-locked doors and iron grates." Gert Town was also one of the main neighborhoods in the city that was plagued by drugs. Gert Town crime rates are 327% higher than the national average, and violent crime rates are 395% higher than the national average. Residents of the area have a one-in-10 chance of becoming a victim of crime. Gert Town is safer than 7% of the cities in Louisiana.

=== Pre-Katrina Population ===
Gert Town was at its highest population in the 1940s with about 8,700 people. The 2000 census showed the population had declined to 4,748, for unknown reasons. Gert Town, in particular, doesn't appear to have a lot of information about population changes between the years of 1950 to 2000. Prior to Hurricane Katrina, only 8.0% of households fit the traditional American stereotype of a married couple with children under the age of 18.

=== Post-Katrina Population ===
Age of Gert Town Citizens
Age	2000	2013–2017
4 years of age and under	5.5%	7.5%
5–9 years old	5.8%	5.0%
10–14 years old	5.5%	3.4%
15–17 years old	3.4%	3.5%
18–34 years old	42.6%	51.6%
35–49 years old	15.9%	11.8%
50–64 years old	10.7%	11.0%
65–74 years old	5.2%	4.5%
75–84 years old	3.5%	1.3%
85 years old and older	1.8%	.4%

In 2005, Hurricane Katrina struck the city of New Orleans, and because of Gert Town's low elevation, the neighborhood was greatly affected. Since then, there has been a decline in the neighborhood population to about 3,614 people. Between the years 2012 and 2016, approximately 54% of the neighborhood population was living in poverty. Although the area is heavily impoverished, of the 3,614 people living in the area, 41.6% of Gert Town's residents are employed. This is an increase from the 34.1% residential employment before Hurricane Katrina.

The small area of Gert Town is largely occupied by a younger demographic. A majority of the employed residents are teens and young adults, working in food services, but before the 2005 hurricane, the Gert Town neighborhood was known for its contribution to the city's industrial sector.

In Gert Town, 27.8% of people do not have a high school diploma. That being said, 32.4% of the population has a high school diploma or equivalent of one, 39.2% have attended college but have not earned a degree, 4.9% have an associate degree, 4.0% have a bachelor's degree, and 1.3% have a Graduate degree.

== Culture ==
=== Music ===
Two historical parks were located in Gert Town: Lincoln Park and Johnson Park. They were adjacent to each other and are located near Earhart Boulevard, where Carrollton Avenue intersects. From 1902 to 1930 both parks were amusement parks where local African-American families gathered. These amusement parks consisted of a skating rink and hot-air balloon rides available on occasional weekends. Today, Lincoln Park is now known as Larry Gilbert Stadium, where youth sports are held. Johnson Park has become Cuccia-Byrnes Playground, where fundraising is done annually for youth activities. Although the parks did have recreational purposes, their main attractions were for entertainment, and specifically for jazz music. Both parks had had great significance in terms of jazz music in New Orleans and the genre of music in entirety.

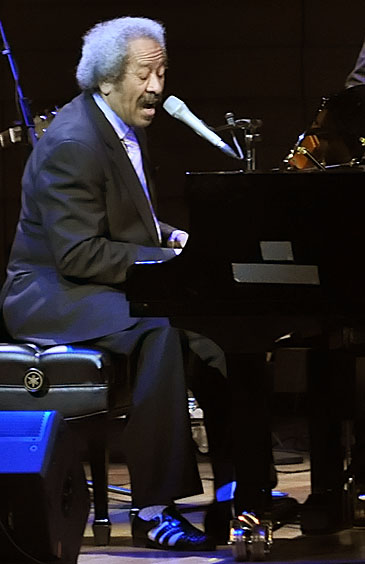
Allen Toussaint, seen here performing in 2004 at the age of 76, spent his early life in the Gert Town area.

Famous jazz musicians who performed at Lincoln and Johnson Park include Buddy Bolden, Bunk Johnson, and Freddie Keppard. Many other featured performances were done by the orchestra of John Robichaux. The most notable performer at the parks was Bolden, who often battled there against other musicians. The contributions of the parks to Gert Town and jazz music still remain in how jazz music evolved using a unique improvising style, which was first exhibited at Lincoln and Johnson Park.

Born in 1877 in New Orleans, Charles "Buddy" Bolden was a pioneer of the early sound of Jazz. Bolden was a prominent trumpeter and is hailed as the king of jazz. Very little is known about his early life. In the early years of his playing with his band, he heard ragtime blues and gospel and fused those styles. Much of his success came while playing in Lincoln Park, an iconic meeting ground for African Americans during the Jim Crow Era. Bolden would play his trumpet or cornet and would call crowds from Johnson Park and the surrounding areas of Gert Town and New Orleans to hear him play.

Willie "Bunk" Johnson was a jazz trumpeter from Gert Town, whose contributions left a significant impact on the jazz genre. Johnson started his musical career at the age of six; at age fifteen he began his professional music career. Johnson's first professional job was under Bolden; and he went on to play professionally in numerous bands that toured Japan, Australia, and South America. Johnson's career temporarily ended in 1932 after being involved in a bar fight that left him jobless because he lost his teeth and destroyed his trumpet. In 1938, fans found him working manual labor in New Iberia. With their donations, he returned to New Orleans, acquired a set of false teeth, and began playing professionally again. After reviving his career, he produced over fifty recordings and achieved both musical and cultural celebrity status.

Gert Town's poverty-stricken neighborhoods helped create the foundation of Hip hop. From these neighborhoods arose Bounce DJs who represented the neighborhoods by calling out their names in specific songs. Hip hop brought fame to the area by representing the hope and desire Gert Town had for its communities, people, and its future as a historical area filled with musical culture. Bounce DJs, specifically Partners 'N' Crime, had songs such as "New Orleans Block Party" that represented their communities they were from – one of them being Gert Town. Full Blooded (also known as Da Hound) is an American rapper formerly signed to Master P's No Limit Records in the late 1990s. He is known by the moniker "Da hound from Gert Town".

=== Food ===
Dunbar's Creole Cuisine is a native Louisiana, family-run restaurant re-established by Celestine Dunbar in 2017. Before moving to 7834 Earhart Boulevard, on the edge of Gert Town, the restaurant, started in 1986, was called Dunbar's Creole Cooking and was on Freret Street.

The roots of the establishment were a local deli off of Oak Street.

It didn't take long for Dunbar's Creole Cooking to receive praise and recognition from both native New Orleans residents and supporters worldwide. It was featured in various magazines such as Southern Living and the Gourmet.

The restaurant was greatly affected by Hurricane Katrina in 2005. The entire business was destroyed, and Dunbar didn't have insurance to cover all the expenses to rebuild and to replace everything that was lost. Dunbar took her business to Loyola Law School's food court in 2006. At this location, she grew her clientele with university students and faculty. She even participated in numerous festivals and other events until she finally found a new location to rebuild her restaurant.

=== Gert Town Festival ===
After Hurricane Katrina, many residents of Gert Town were forced to leave and the community itself was lacking resources. Schools, churches, and other businesses were abandoned. To rebuild Gert Town, many residents gathered under tents and booths, on a hot Saturday, to hold the first Gert Town Festival in 2010. The festival was a way to start reforming the community and to raise awareness for the needs of the community. The community made "strong relationships with adjacent neighborhoods, which include Hollygrove and Fontainebleau, among others."

The events still go on to this day, hosted by the New Orleans Recreation Development Commission and Fit NOLA Parks. The parks hoped to "increase the use of neighborhood parks and provide access to healthy foods in underserved areas." Giving the families a chance to have a fun day, while also helping the community get back on their feet. One Saturday in June, the people of Gert Town gather for a second line in the park. The second line is led by Da Truth Bass Band and then the fun begins. Many community organizations, students, and local artists, such as Dj Captain Charles provided entertainment. Free food, drinks, and games for all ages are provided. Gert Town's festival brings back the joy the community once had.

=== Mardi Gras Indians ===
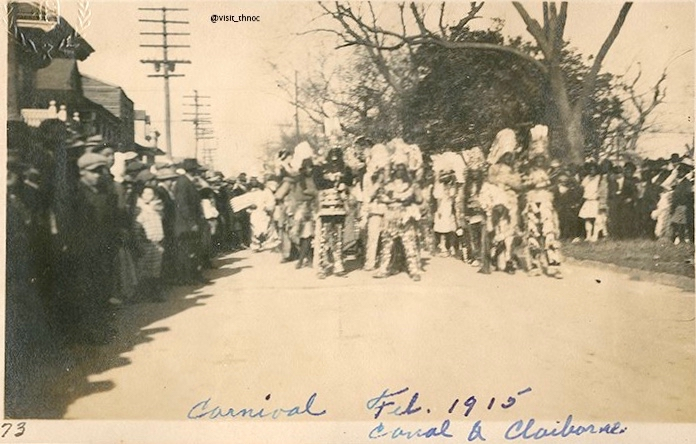
Mardi Gras Indians marching through the neightboring Mid-City area in 1915.

Mardi Gras Indians are one of the oldest cultural traditions brought to New Orleans from African tribes. The African drumming traditions in the Indian tribes combined with the traditions of the New Orleans brass bands have had an influence on jazz in New Orleans. Many Indian gangs support the bands of traditional second-line parades or jazz funerals with percussion instruments.

Larry Bannock, also known as "Big Chief Larry Bannock", is a Mardi Gras Indian from Gert Town who grew up on Edinburgh Street. Bannock began Indian masking with the Gert Town crew "Golden Star" in 1972. He continued rising in rank where he eventually became Big Chief of the tribe in 1979 and renamed it the Golden Star Hunters, who he also referred to as the 17 Hounds. As the chief, Bannock lead his crew and demonstrated his creativity through the Indian costume designs and performances that he exhibited. Bannock knew how to bead and sew Indian suits, often teaching and sharing his skills with others in his community.

Bannock received national notoriety in 1980 when he toured the world with one of his hand-sewn suits selected by the Smithsonian Institution to represent the culture of Mardi Gras Indians. In the 1980s, Bannock became one of the first Indians to receive a grant to teach the sewing tradition of Mardi Gras Indians. His costume designs were heavily influenced by African Americans. Indian suits are preservations of African American folk art and are representations of New Orleans' complex culture. These colorful beaded suits are hand-sewn all year long before they are paraded around the streets of New Orleans and shown off while singing, dancing, and chanting folk songs.

Bannock served as president of the Mardi Gras council, where he shared his knowledge on Indian traditions and culture. Bannock and The Golden Star Hunters were annual performers at the New Orleans Jazz and Heritage Festival, until he died three days after his appearance at the festival in 2014.

== Notable residents ==
- Dave Bartholomew
- Merry Clayton
- Tami Lynn
- Sybil Haydel Morial
- Garrett Morris
- Allen Toussaint

== See also ==
- Neighborhoods in New Orleans
- Xavier University of Louisiana
