= Demourelles Island =

Island in New Orleans, Louisiana, US

- Interactive map of Demourelles Island

Geography
- Location: Bayou St. John
- Coordinates: 30°0′6.73″N 90°5′2.26″W
- Adjacent to: Bayou St. John
- Highest elevation: 1 m (3 ft)

Administration
- United States
- State: Louisiana
- City: New Orleans
- County: Orleans Parish

Demourelles Island (French: Île des Demourelles) is a small island in the Bayou St. John in New Orleans, Louisiana. It was created after the American Civil War by cutting off a deep bend in Bayou St. John, "the Devil's Elbow," that created difficulties for commercial navigation. It was owned by the Demourelle family until 1905.

It is located in Orleans Parish, the bayou at this point is paralleled on both sides by St. Bernard Ave. and Wisner Ave. and crossed by Harrison Ave. The island itself is accessed by Park Island Drive.
