= Lincoln Park (New Orleans) =

Amusement park in New Orleans, Louisiana

- Interactive map of Lincoln Park
- Type: Urban park
- Location: 3355 Joliet St, New Orleans, Louisiana 70118
- Coordinates: 29°57′54″N 90°06′58″W

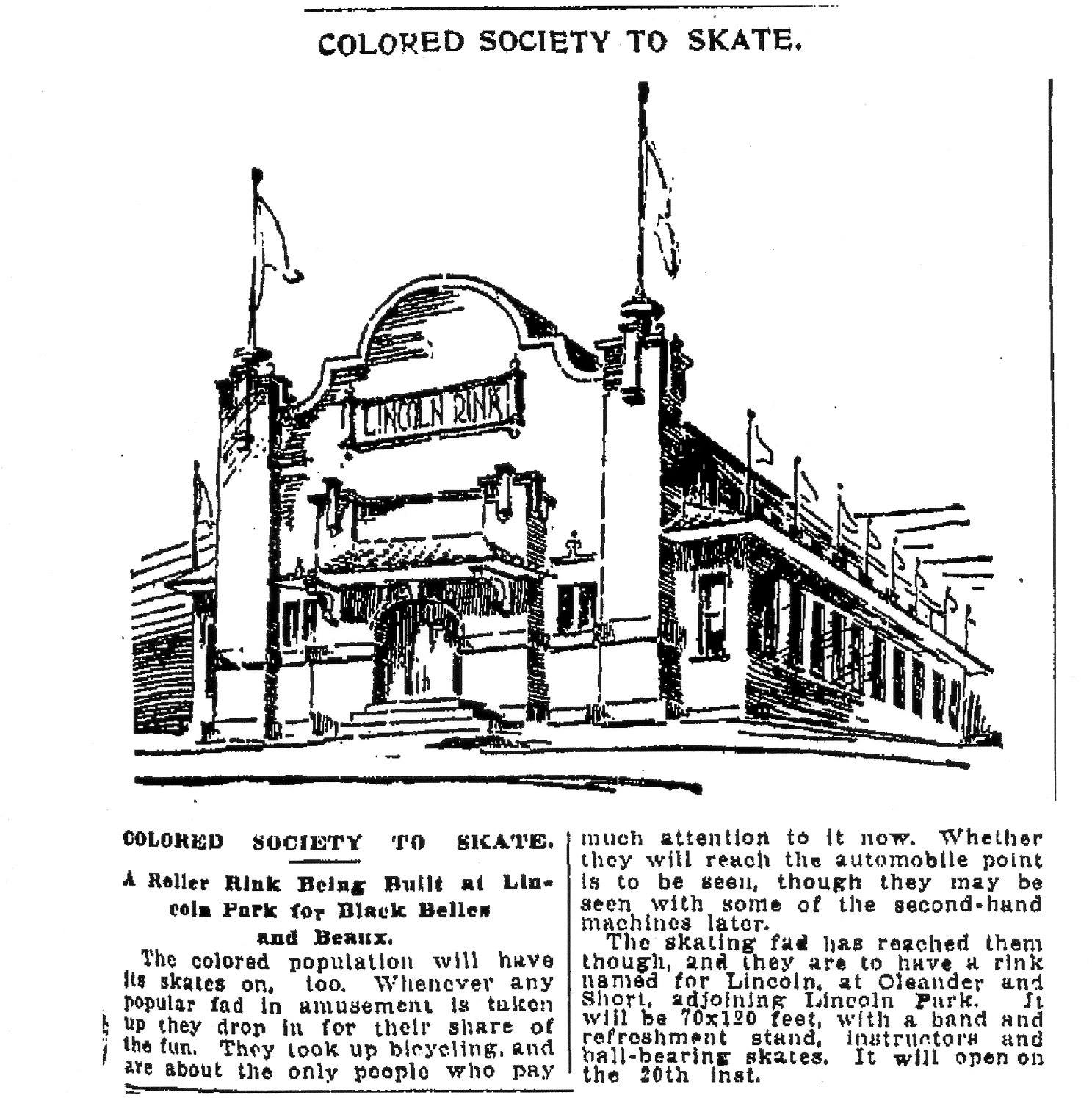
Lincoln Rink drawing of this skating rink under construction in 1906

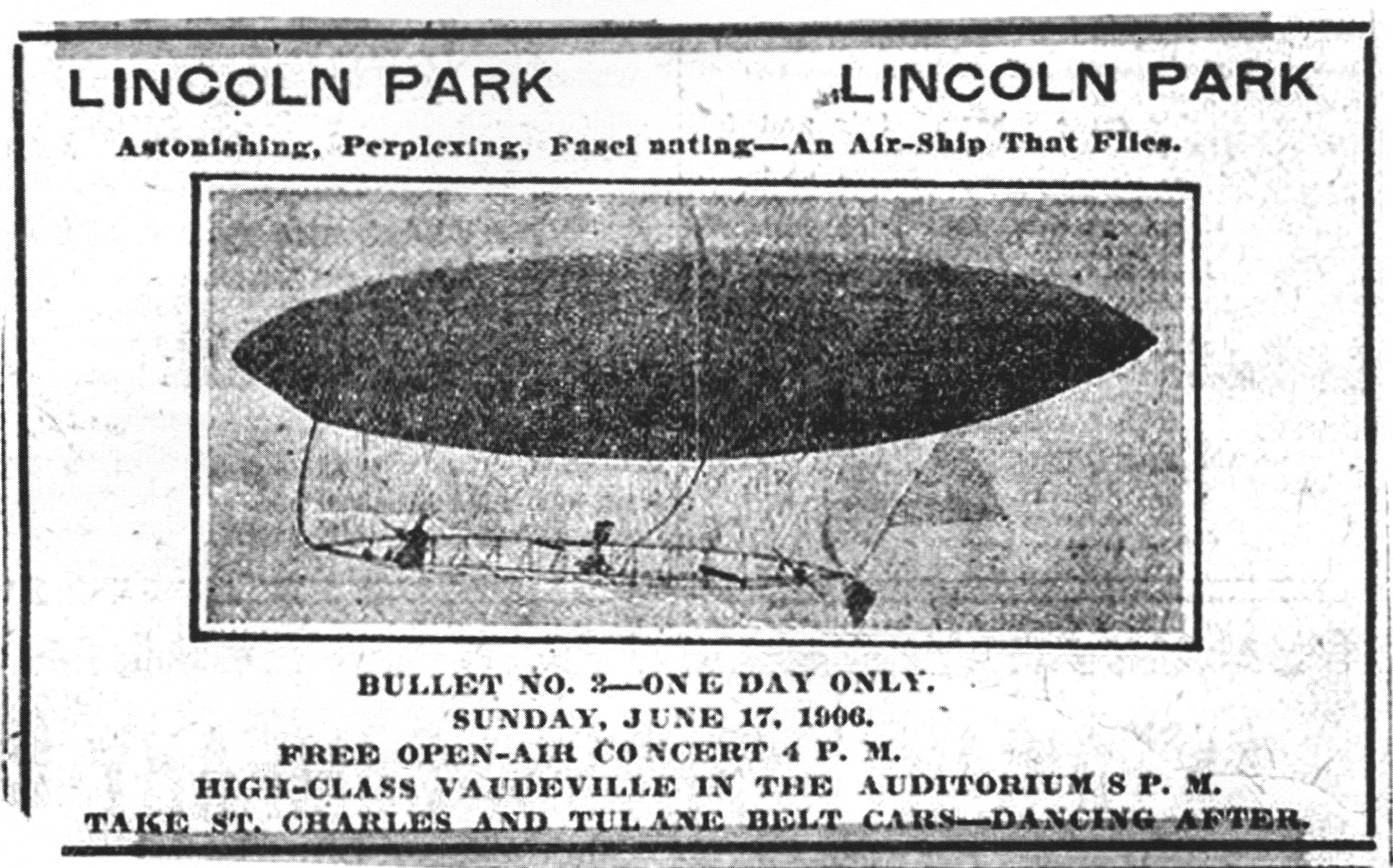
"Bullet No. 2" "Air-ship" ad for demonstration on Sunday, June 17th, 1906

Lincoln Park was a noted amusement park in New Orleans, Louisiana from 1902 to 1930. It was located in the city's Gert Town section, on the downtown side of Carrollton Avenue between Oleander and Forshay Streets (near where Earhart Boulevard intersects Carrollton Ave now). It was devoted to amusements for the city's African American population.

== History ==
Lincoln Park was created in May, 1902 when the Standard Brewing Company bought the site from Yazoo and Mississippi River Railroad Company. The New Orleans City Council had already given permission to the brewing company to make a private park on the property if they purchased the land. The Standard Brewing Company fenced in the park, built a large pavilion dance hall behind the Carrollton Avenue entrance, and charged 15 cents for entrance. For several years in the first decade of the 1900s the adjacent block across Short Street was "Johnson Park".

== Entertainment ==
Lincoln Park contained a skating rink, and featured hot air balloon ascensions on weekends. Other entertainment included prize fighting and vaudeville shows.

Early jazz musicians such as Buddy Bolden, Bunk Johnson, Freddie Keppard were heard there, and John Robichaux's Orchestra was a regular feature.
