= Lafitte Greenway =

Linear park in New Orleans, Louisiana, United States

Coordinates: 29°58′22″N 90°5′29″W

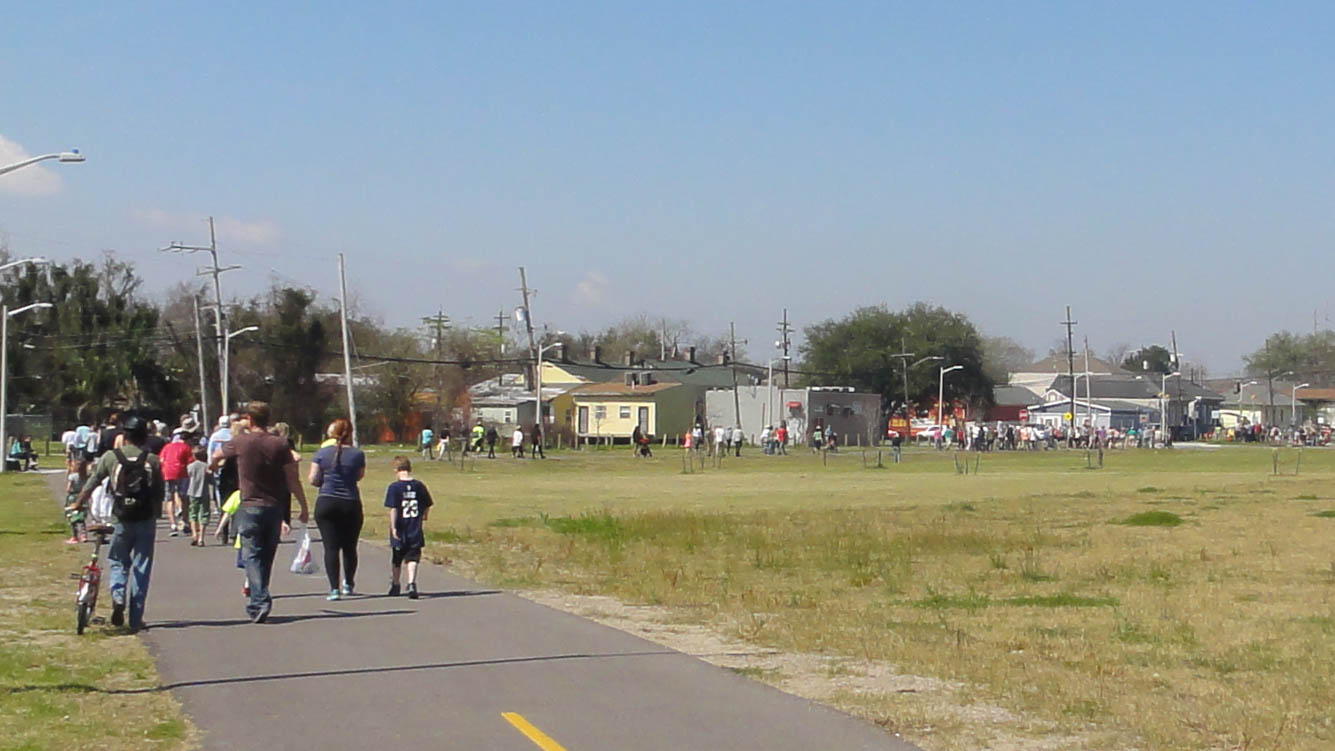
Over 700 people came out for the tenth annual hike of the Lafitte Greenway.

The Lafitte Greenway is a trail for pedestrians and bicycles located in New Orleans, Louisiana, extending from Louis Armstrong Park to Bayou St. John and beyond. Opened in 2015, it is the latest reconfiguration of a historic transportation corridor that has been in use for over two centuries.

== Description ==
The Lafitte Greenway extends 2.6 miles from the Basin Street trailhead (located near the Municipal Auditorium in Armstrong Park) to the Alexander Street trailhead. Passing through the Tremé, Lafitte, and Mid-City, the trail essentially connects neighborhoods from the French Quarter to Lakeview.

Landscaping along the greenway includes native plantings and bioswales and has been the subject of proposals for innovative stormwater management.

The City of New Orleans has also adopted a revitalization plan, designed to attract investment along the corridor.

The trail officially opened 6 November, 2015. Construction of Design Workshop's award-winning plan was funded largely through Disaster Community Development Block Grants (CDBG-D) allocated after Hurricane Katrina, with the initial phase costing $9.1 million.

== History ==
This area has been as a transportation corridor for New Orleans since at least 1794. The land occupied by the Greenway was previously used by the Southern Railway (U.S.) and before that by the Carondelet Canal. Before the New Orleans Union Passenger Terminal was built in 1954, this route was used to enable passenger trains of the Southern Railway (now Norfolk Southern Railway) to access the Southern Railway Terminal (New Orleans), which was located on Basin Street at Canal. Ideas for repurposing the land began to percolate in the 1970s from civil rights activists such as Rudy Lombard and in the work of architect Clifton James.

The city sold a large portion of the land to the Louisiana Institute of Film Technology in early 2006. However, plans for a grand studio never materialized, and in 2010 the Trust for Public Land brokered a deal which returned the land to public ownership.

Starting in 2005, activists organized a series of annual hikes to raise awareness of the project, with hundreds of participants hiking each year over rough terrain on the site of the proposed trail.

== Future plans ==
The City of New Orleans plans to extend the greenway another half-mile into the Lakeview neighborhood to Canal Boulevard. This stretch of trail would run alongside an active rail-line which services a local brickyard. Negotiations with Norfolk Southern are ongoing.

== See also ==
- Drainage in New Orleans
- Rail trail
