= List of streets of New Orleans =

New Orleans, Louisiana, U.S.A., includes such notable streets as:

- Allen Toussaint Boulevard (formerly Robert E Lee Boulevard)
- Almonaster Avenue
- Audubon Place (private access only)
- Baronne Street
- Basin Street
- Bayou Road
- Bienville Street
- Bourbon Street
- Broad Street
- Burgundy Street
- Calliope Street
- Camp Street
- Canal Boulevard
- Canal Street
- Carondelet Street
- Carrollton Avenue
- Chartres Street
- City Park Avenue
- Claiborne Avenue
- Conti Street
- Dante Street
- Dauphine Street
- Decatur Street
- Desire Street
- Dryades Street
- Dumaine Street
- Earhart Expressway, an extension of Earhart Boulevard
- Elysian Fields Avenue
- Esplanade Avenue
- Exchange Place (pedestrian only)
- Felicity Street
- Freret Street
- Frenchmen Street
- Gayoso Street
- Gentilly Boulevard
- Girod Street
- Gravier Street
- Hastings Place
- Henry Clay Avenue
- Howard Avenue
- Iberville Street
- Jackson Avenue
- Julia Street
- Lafayette Street
- Lakeshore Drive
- Louisiana Avenue
- Lowerline Street
- Loyola Avenue
- Magazine Street
- Magnolia Street
- Marengo Street
- Martin Luther King Jr. Boulevard
- McAlister Place (pedestrian only)
- Napoleon Avenue
- Norman C. Francis Parkway (formerly Jefferson Davis Parkway)
- Oak Street
- Opelousas Avenue
- Oretha Castle Haley Boulevard
- Orleans Street
- Pearl Street
- Peters Street
- Press Street
- Pontchartrain Expressway
- Poydras Street
- Prytania Street
- Rampart Street
- Royal Street
- Simon Bolivar Avenue
- St. Ann Street
- St. Charles Avenue
- St. Claude Avenue
- St. Louis Street
- St. Peter Street
- St. Philip Street
- Tchoupitoulas Street
- Tivoli Circle
- Toulouse Street
- Tulane Avenue
- Upperline Street
- Ursulines Street
- Washington Avenue

== See also ==
- Barthelemy Lafon (1769–1820), namer of Lower Garden District streets
- Bernard de Marigny (1785–1868), namer of Faubourg Marigny & Bywater streets
- History of New Orleans
- Neighborhoods in New Orleans
  - Downtown New Orleans
  - French Quarter
  - Uptown New Orleans
