= Freret Street =

- Street
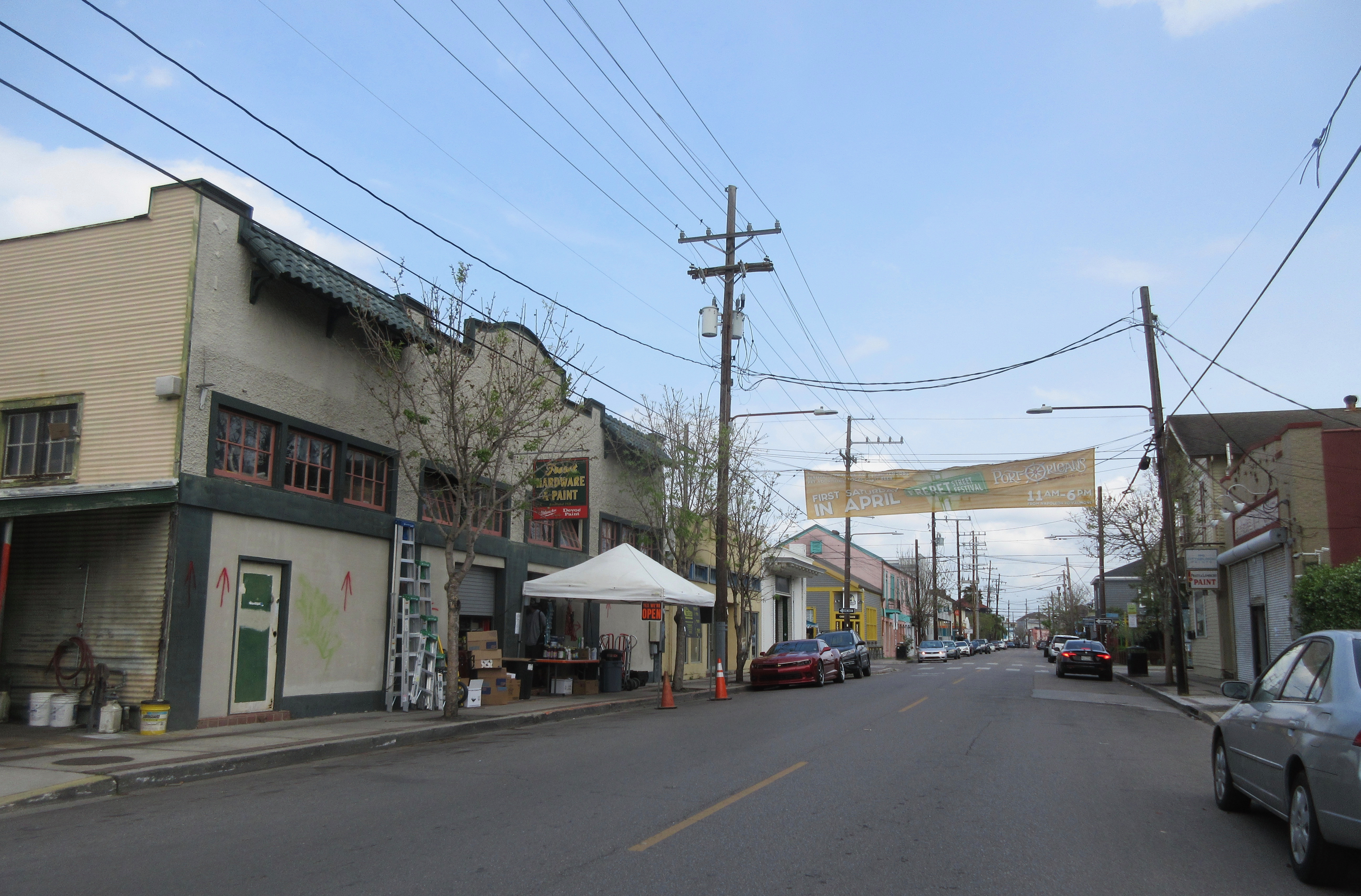
- Freret Street's commercial district
- Country: United States
- State: Louisiana
- City: New Orleans
- Planning District: Uptown Area/ District 3

Dimensions
  - Length: 6.3 km (3.9 mi)
- Time zone: UTC-6 (CST)
- Postal codes: 70113, 70115, 70118
- Area code: 504

Freret Street is a street located in uptown New Orleans, Louisiana, United States, that extends from Leake Avenue to the Pontchartrain Expressway. Lying south of the neighborhood of Freret, Freret Street is known for its commercial corridor located between the street's intersection with Jefferson Avenue and Napoleon Avenue. It includes a wide range of restaurants, bars, and other entertainment venues.

== History ==
In 1894, Freret Street was named for William Freret, who served as mayor of New Orleans from 1840 to 1842, and then from 1843 to 1844. Although six stores were distributed between 29 residential buildings by 1909, Freret Street was composed mainly of vacant land. The area near Freret Street and the neighborhood of Freret was once occupied by the Bouligny and Avart plantations. The removal of these plantations left the area flood-prone. Around 1910, the roads of Freret Street were made of cobblestone, though other streets were still made out of dirt.

Freret Street was an optimal location for businesses, as it was located near the Our Lady of Lourdes Church on Napoleon Avenue and was of walking distance from the Freret neighborhood. Beginning in the 1920s, Freret Street saw a growth of small businesses run by Jewish and Italians, who resided near their establishments. Some even converted their homes into their business. The Jewish family, the Singers, established a hardware store that sold supplies to home builders in the Uptown area. Across the street was a beauty parlour established by the Barrecas family in the 1930s. The Barrecas would go on to open Frank's Steak House.

The events of the Great Depression near the end of the 1920s resulted in financial hardship for businesses on the street. Freret Street's commercial corridor began to decline as Merrick Elementary School, formally an all-white school, changed to instead accommodate only black students in 1952, which led to a population shift. FHA low-interest loans and the establishment of more popular retailers outside of Freret Street drove away business in the early 1970s. The Neighborhood Commercial Revitalization Program in the late 1970s, the National Trust Main Street Program's adoption of Freret Street in 2001, and the city's promise of $300,000 were brought about in hopes of restoring businesses on the street.

=== Freret Streetcar Line ===
In 1924, the New Orleans Public Service began operating a streetcar on Freret Street to connect the businesses on Freret Street to the university section located north of the Mississippi River. However, it is unclear which year its operations ceased. While one source states that the streetcar line ended in 1939, another source states that it ended in 1946. For the next twenty years, Freret Street utilized buses and trolleys.

=== Long's Bakery ===
Long's Bakery, famous for its potato salad, opened on Freret Street in the 1940s. After decades of business, its founder, William "Bill" Long, was fatally shot after an attempted robbery near the front of his store. Eyewitnesses accused Jerome Smith as the guilty party, despite his alibi stating that he was at a youth study center with his mother, placing him away from the scene of the crime. Although further evidence surfaced showing his innocence, Smith remains at Angola State Penitentiary today. The murder of Bill Long was a factor in Freret Street's decline, as it heightened fears of crime in the area. Today, however, the space that held Long's Bakery is once being again used for a bakery.

== Entertainment and Restaurants ==
Freret Street's commercial district spans seven blocks, featuring various restaurants, bars, and other cultural activities. Freret Street stand out from other New Orleans streets in that much of its success is highly due to its location in a residential neighborhood, bringing in mainly local customers, rather than due to tourism. The street's proximity to various local schools brings in much business to its establishments.

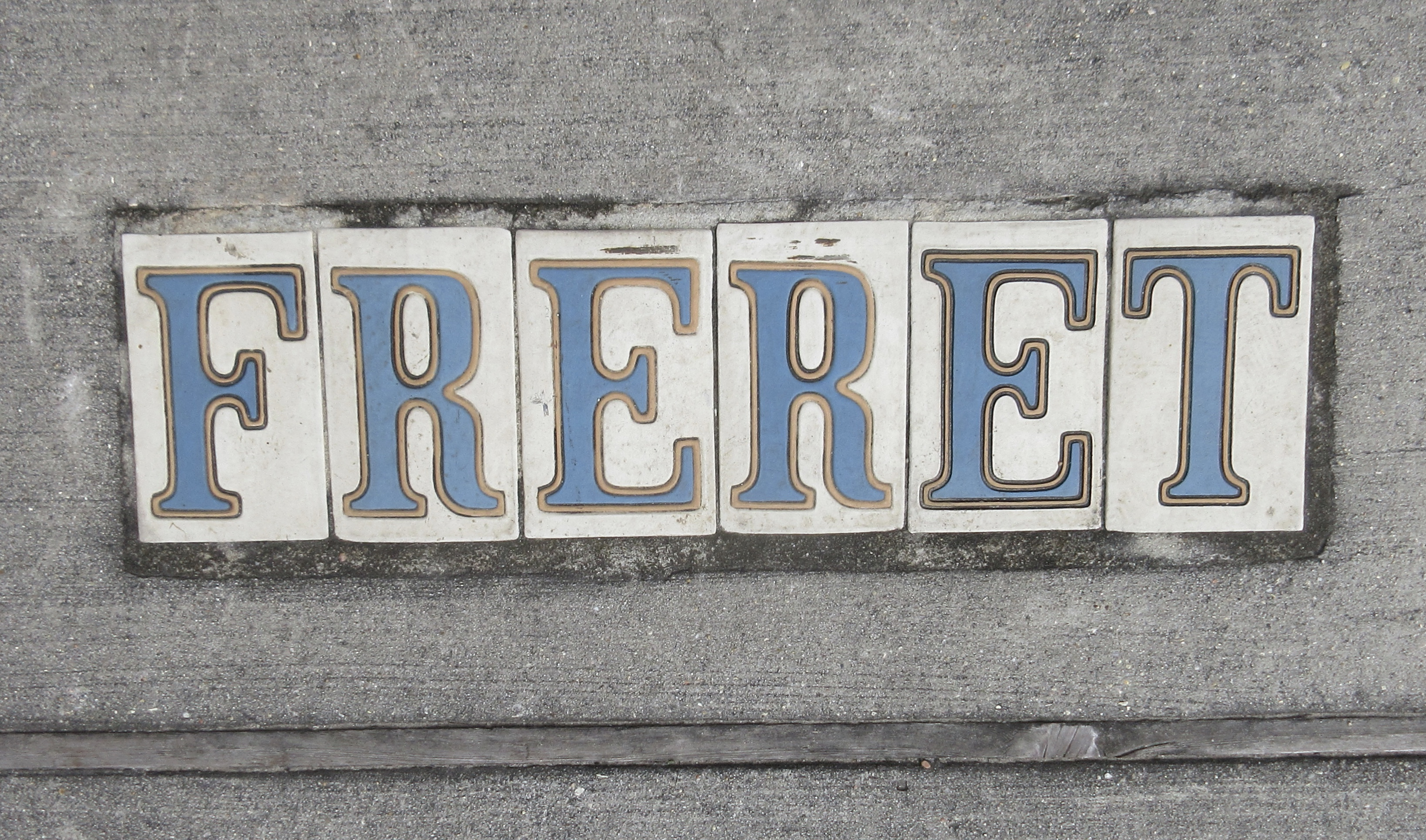
Freret Street Sidewalk Tiles

=== Krewe of Freret ===
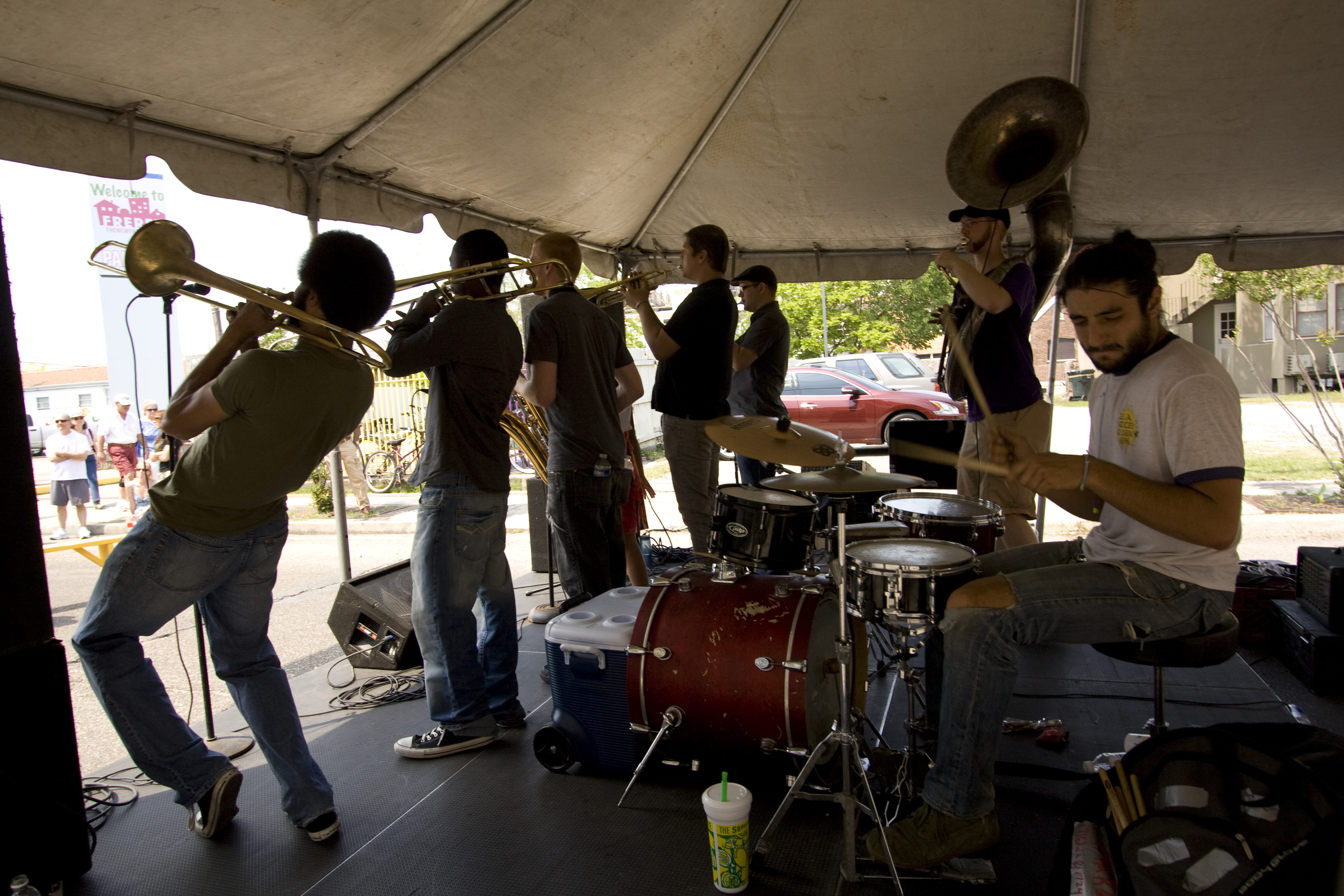
A band playing at Freret Street's Festival in 2011

In 1952, Freret Street began hosting the Krewe of Freret during the Mardi Gras holiday. The original Freret parade ended after 1994, however, after suffering from hard times. The Krewe of Freret was revitalized in 2011 by seven Loyola alumni in an attempt to continue the Mardi Gras tradition. The parade aims to support local businesses, musicians, and other entertainers. The Krewe of Freret hosts seasonal events such as Krewe of Freret's Eat Street and Krewe of Freret's Summer Strut. In 2014, the Krewe of Freret began their parades once again, now traveling down St. Charles Avenue.

=== Freret Street Market ===
The Freret Market, found near Freret Street's intersection with Napoleon Avenue, was founded in September 2007 in efforts to restore Freret Street's commercial corridor. It is open on the first Saturday of every month, with the exception of June, July, and August. The market contains 70 vendors, who sell items within the categories of art, flea, farmer produce, and food.

=== Freret Street Festival ===
Freret Street hosts its own street festival located between Napoleon Avenue and Soniat Street each spring. It contains New Orleans-related music such as rock, swamp pop, and brass bands. The festival also features performances from Mardi Gras Indians and dancers. Moreover, it includes various activities for children to enjoy, such as a petting zoo, encounters with alligators, arts and crafts, and child-friendly performers.

=== Gasa Gasa ===
Gasa Gasa is a music venue that showcases various medias of art, including its own folk museum, film screenings, and art shows. It opened on July 20, 2013. The onset of the 2019 Coronavirus Pandemic, however, led to the closing of the club before St. Patrick's Day in 2020. The venue is currently displayed on a real estate website in hopes that the club will continue to be established.

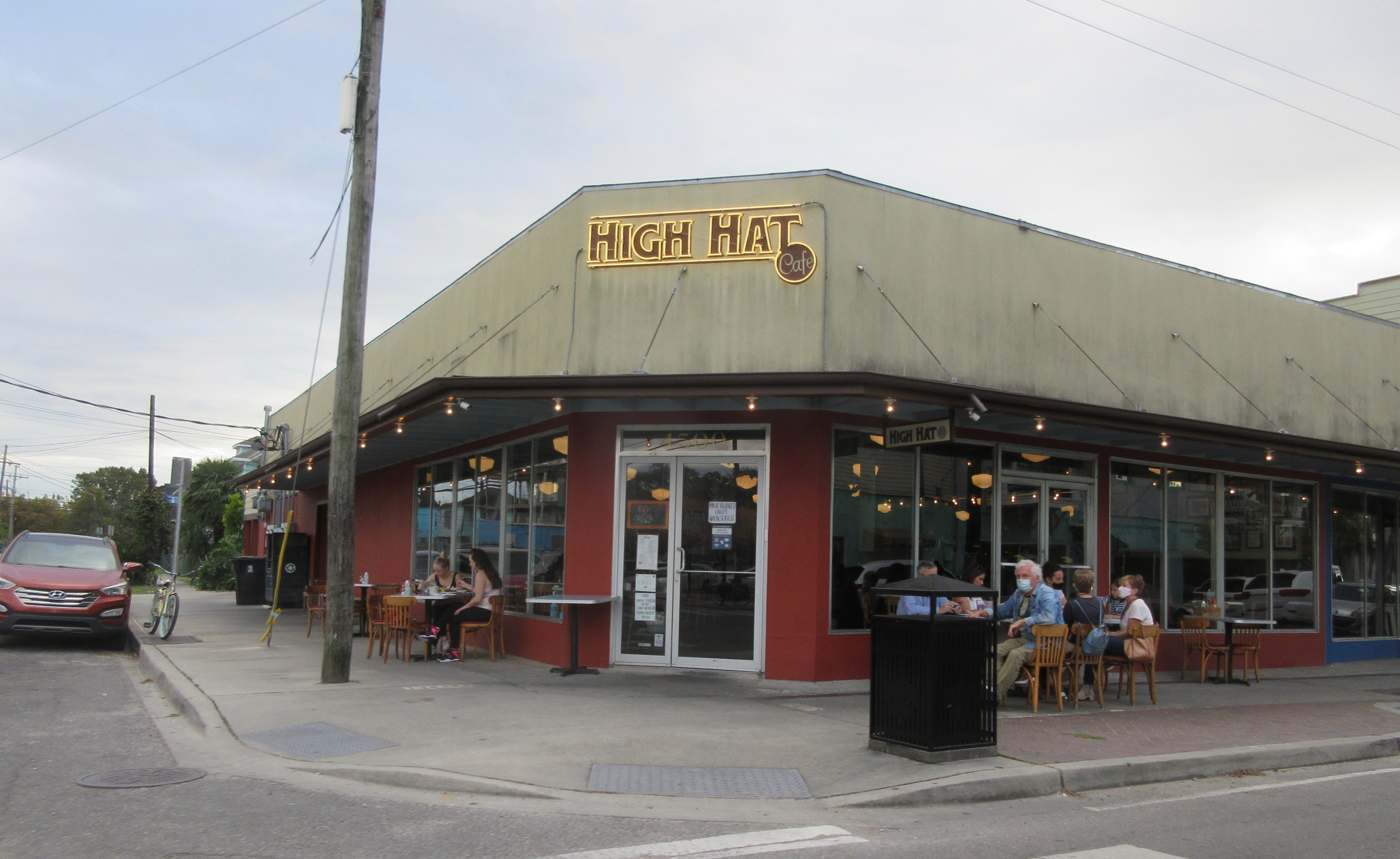
High Hat Cafe during the COVID-19 pandemic

=== Restaurants ===
Freret Street features many restaurants, most of which are located between Jefferson Avenue and Napoleon Avenue. It includes Dat Dog, High Hat Cafe, Humble Bagel, Freret Beer Room, Cure, Company Burger, Ancora, Piccola Gelateria, and Blaze Pizza.

== See also ==
- List of Streets in New Orleans
