= Blue Plate Mayonnaise =

Brand of mayonnaise

Blue Plate
- Product type: Mayonnaise
- Country: United States
- Introduced: 1927; 99 years ago
- Website: blueplatemayo.com

Blue Plate Mayonnaise is a brand of mayonnaise owned by Reily Foods Company, headquartered in New Orleans, Louisiana.

Blue Plate was created by the Wesson Oil & Snowdrift Company in 1929 and founded by Charles A. Nehlig, chief operating officer of subsidiary company Gulf and Valley Cotton Oil Company. One of the first commercially prepared mayonnaise brands in the United States, it was produced in Gretna, Louisiana, until 1941 when production was moved to the Blue Plate Building in Gert Town, New Orleans. Reily Foods purchased Blue Plate in 1974 and continued to use the same factory until production was moved in 2000 to the Reily Foods factory in Knoxville, Tennessee.

The Blue Plate Building has since been converted into the Blue Plate Artist Lofts and is listed on the National Register of Historic Places.

== History ==
Former Blue Plate logo

Blue Plate mayo was invented during the 1929 streetcar strike, during which the po' boy was also invented. Internally, Blue Plate and its advertising agency, Tilt, unofficially refer to their mayo as "the official mayonnaise of the po' boy."

== Reception ==
In 2018, Epicurious listed Blue Plate as "the best mayonnaise you can buy in a grocery store."

Blue Plate Mayo tied for runner-up with Kewpie in Southern Living's "The Best Mayonnaise" 2024 survey, with Duke's Mayo winning.

== See also ==
- List of mayonnaises
