= Mid-City New Orleans =

Mid-City
- New Orleans neighborhood
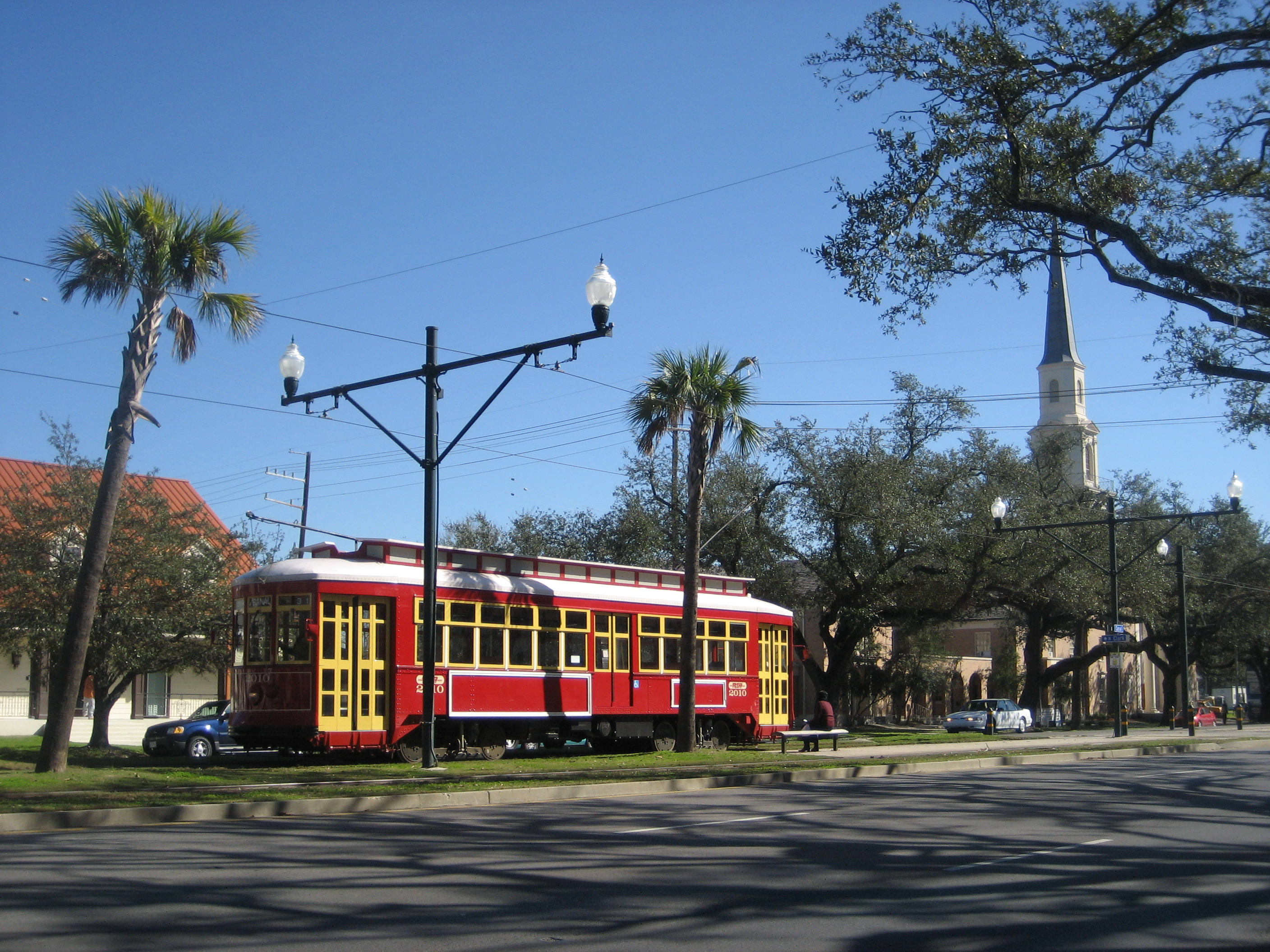
- Canal Streetcar in Mid-City

- Flag

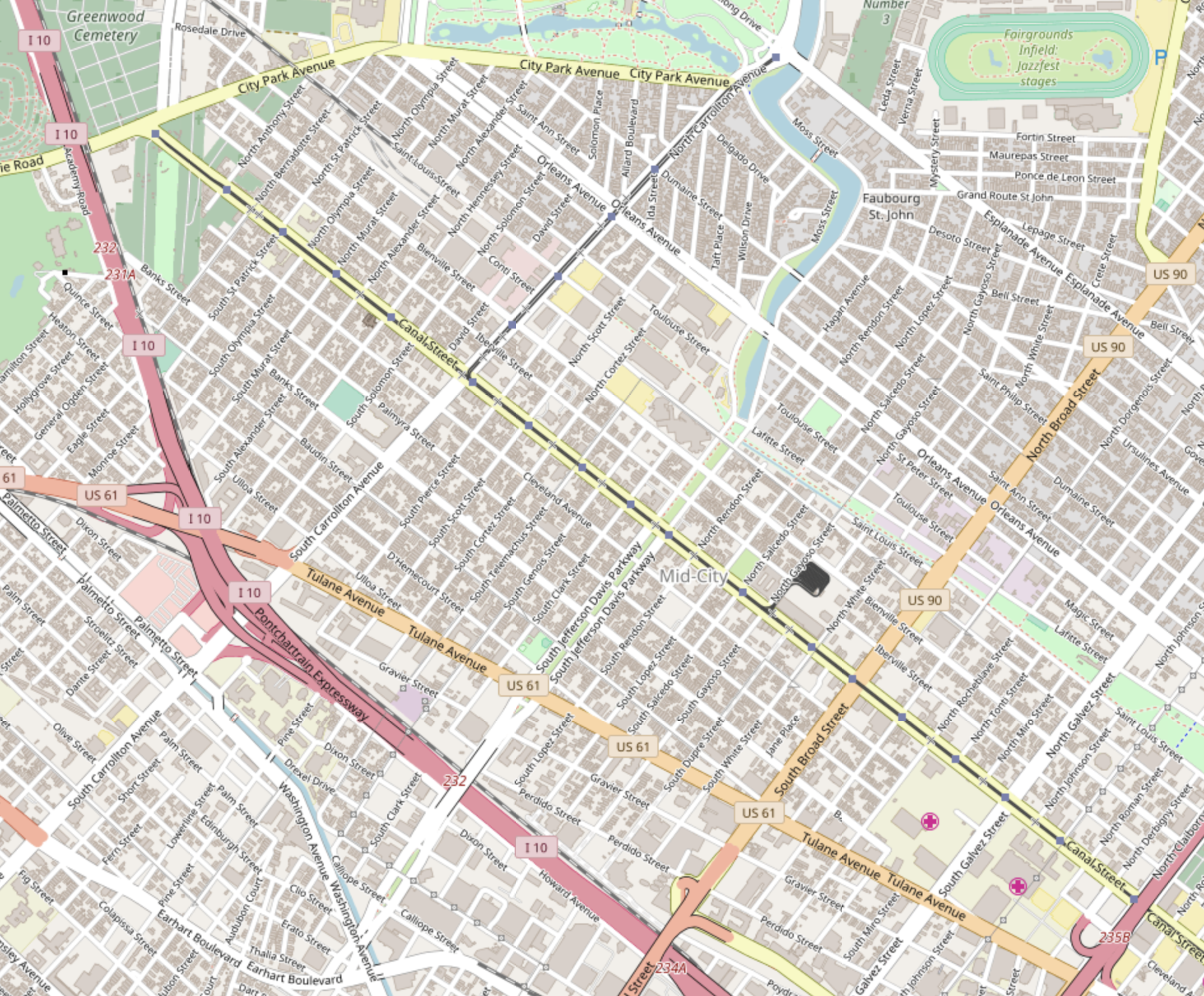
- Coordinates: 29°58′19″N 90°05′49″W
- Country: United States
- State: Louisiana
- City: New Orleans
- Planning District: District 4, Mid-City District

Area
  - Total: 1.66 sq mi (4.3 km^{2})
  - Land: 1.66 sq mi (4.3 km^{2})
  - Water: 0.00 sq mi (0 km^{2})
- Elevation: 0 ft (0 m)

Population (2010)
  - Total: 6,217
  - Density: 3,750/sq mi (1,450/km^{2})
- Time zone: UTC-6 (CST)
  - Summer (DST): UTC-5 (CDT)
- Area code: 504

- Mid-City Historic District
- U.S. National Register of Historic Places
- U.S. Historic district
- Location within Louisiana Location within the United States
- Location: Roughly bounded by Derbigny St., Conti St., City Park Ave. and I-10, New Orleans, Louisiana
- Area: 850 acres (340 ha)
- Architect: Multiple
- Architectural style: Bungalow/Craftsman, Colonial Revival, Italianate
- NRHP reference No.: 93001394
- Added to NRHP: December 10, 1993

Mid-City is a neighborhood of the city of New Orleans. A sub-district of the Mid-City District Area, its boundaries as defined by the New Orleans City Planning Commission are: City Park Avenue, Toulouse Street, North Carrollton, Orleans Avenue, Bayou St. John and St. Louis Street to the north, North Broad Street to the east, and the Pontchartrain Expressway to the west. It is a historic district on the National Register of Historic Places. In 2023, the neighborhood was cited as one of the "coolest" in the world by Time Out. In common usage, a somewhat larger area surrounding these borders, usually the areas bounded by the beltway formed by Interstates 10 and 610, is often also referred to as part of Mid-City.

== Geography ==
Mid-City is located at 29°58′19″N 90°05′49″W and has an elevation of 0 feet (0.0 m). According to the United States Census Bureau, the district has a total area of 1.66 square miles (4.3 km^{2}), all land.

Mid-City is located, as the name indicates, in the middle of New Orleans on what was once the backslope of the Mississippi River natural levee, a gradually declining section of the river's flood plain. As such, it was not settled as early as adjacent neighborhoods and was called the "back of town"—the city ended at the swamp, unlike today, when the city reaches the lake. The Esplanade Ridge and the adjoining Metairie Ridge formed a natural spur from the River; but what is now Mid-City, surrounded by these higher-elevated sections, was part of the "backswamp" until development in the late nineteenth and early twentieth centuries.

=== Adjacent neighborhoods ===
- Navarre (north)
- City Park (north)
- Bayou St. John (north)
- Tulane/Gravier (east)
- Gert Town (south)
- Dixon (west)
- Lakewood (west)

=== Boundaries ===
The New Orleans City Planning Commission defines the boundaries of Mid-City as these streets: City Park Avenue, Toulouse Street, North Carrollton Avenue, Orleans Avenue, Bayou St. John, St. Louis Street, North Broad Street and the Pontchartrain Expressway.

== Demographics ==
As of the census of 2000, there were 19,909 people, 5,830 households, and 2,939 families residing in the neighborhood. The population density was 11,993 /mi^{2} (4,630 /km^{2}).

As of the census of 2010, there were 14,633 people, 5,258 households, and 2,318 families residing in the neighborhood.

Mid-City is one of New Orleans most racially diverse neighborhoods with its proximity to uptown, downtown and the suburbs contributing to its integrated diversity.

== Landmarks ==
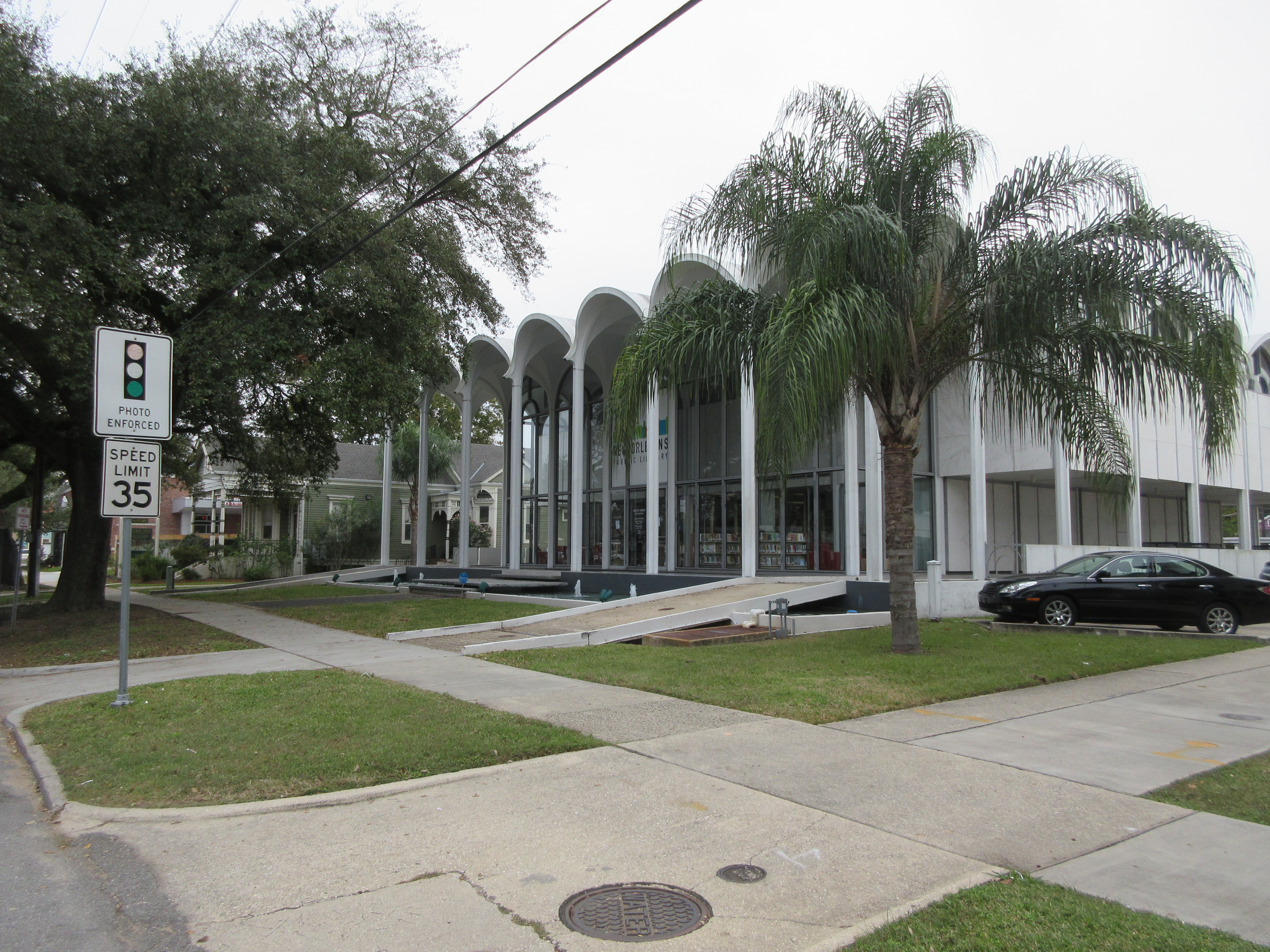
Mid-City branch of New Orleans Public Library in 2016

Mid-City is the home of a number of city landmarks. Canal Street, one of the most important thoroughfares of the city, bisects the neighborhood down the middle; the streetcar route follows Canal to Carrollton Avenue, another prominent New Orleans street that passes through Mid-City. Tulane Avenue, which is the terminus of U.S. Route 61, also runs just upriver from Canal Street; before the interstate highway system, this was the primary route into New Orleans from Baton Rouge. An important cross-street is Norman C. Francis Parkway, named for the former president of Xavier University of Louisiana, which is located near the southwestern end of the parkway.

The Orleans Parish Criminal Court, the Faubourg Brewing Company, Jesuit High School, Warren Easton High School, and the Falstaff Brewery (now converted to apartments) are physically among the most prominent buildings scattered across Mid-City, in addition to a number of churches and large houses along Canal Street. Tulane Avenue in particular shows some remnants of the area's industrial past. However, more characteristic of Mid-City today are the many shotgun houses and larger houses that make up most of this primarily residential neighborhood.

== Culture ==
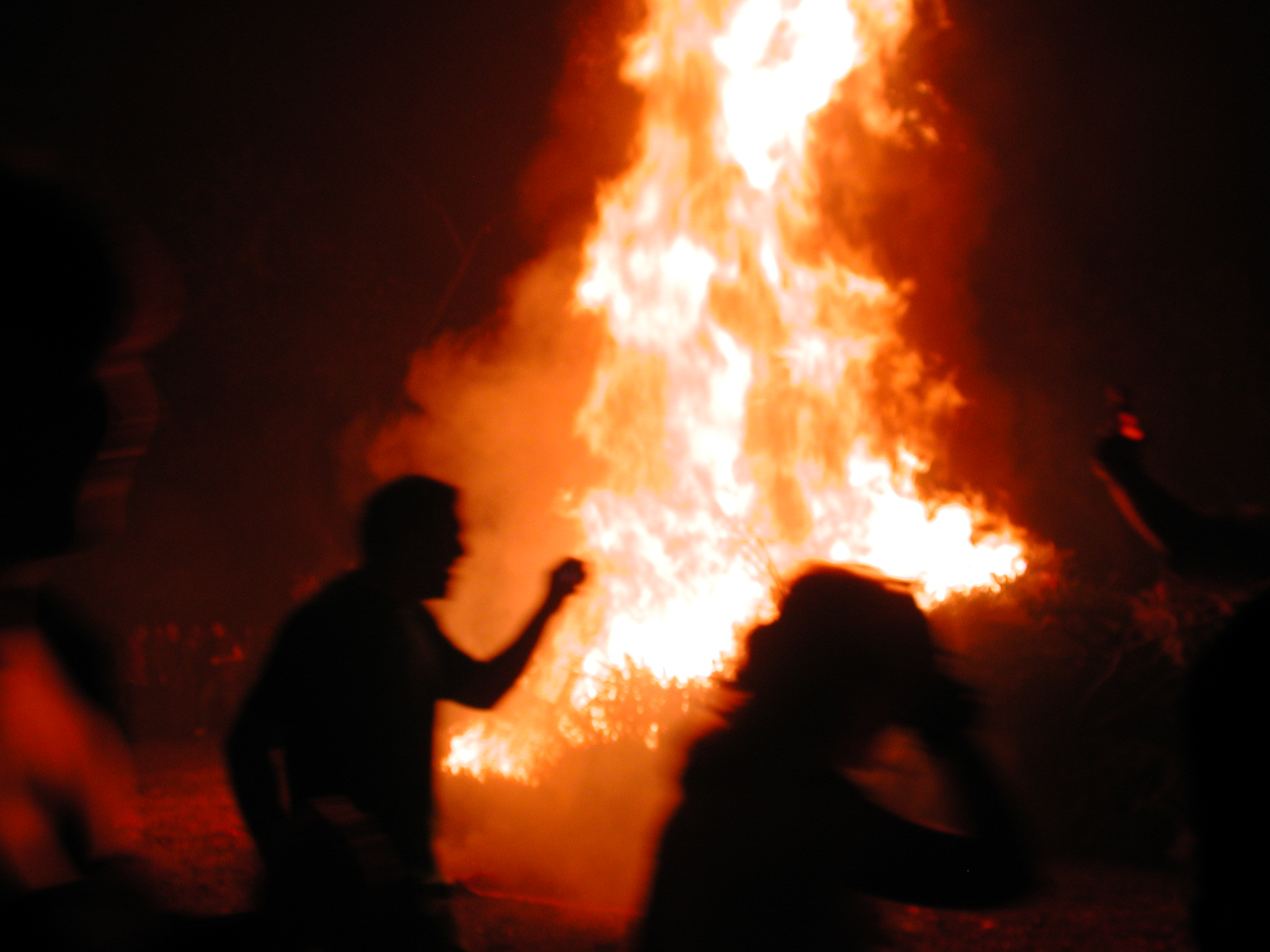
Running around the New Year bonfire in Mid-City New Orleans (2006)

Mid-City is a generally local, middle-class neighborhood in that it contains fewer tourist destinations than other parts of the city. Restaurants and bars rely heavily on local clientele, giving the area a quirky local flavor.

In the period before Hurricane Katrina on New Year's Eve, residents of Mid-City placed their Christmas trees in an area in Orleans Avenue and created a bonfire with the trees. They then threw fireworks into the bonfire. Joanna Weiss of the Boston Globe reported that "a fire truck waited down the street, almost as an afterthought."

== Hurricane Katrina ==
Mid-City experienced extensive flooding in the aftermath of Hurricane Katrina and has been involved in an ongoing rebuilding effort. Repopulation and reconstruction are concentrated along major thoroughfares; March 2007 estimates were that 55% of the residents were again living in the area.

== Education ==
New Orleans Public Schools and Recovery School District operate the public school system.

Warren Easton Senior High School is in Mid-City.

The Israel Meyer Augustine Middle School building was put for sale in 2014.

New Orleans Public Library operates the Mid-City Branch.

== See also ==
- Neighborhoods in New Orleans
