= Luzianne =

American food and drink brand

- Current owner: Reily Foods Company
- Country: United States
- Markets: Tea, Southern foodstuffs
- Website: www.luzianne.com

Luzianne (an adaptation of "Luzianna", a Cajun pronunciation for "Louisiana") is the brand name for a line of Southern beverages and packaged goods, of which Luzianne coffee and iced tea products are the best known. Although most Luzianne products are available throughout the country, the popularity of the brand rests mainly in the Southern United States. Products carrying the Luzianne brand name are manufactured by the Reily Foods Company, which has its headquarters in New Orleans, Louisiana. In 2017, Luzianne was the second largest seller of tea in the United States, with annual sales of over $200 million.

== History ==
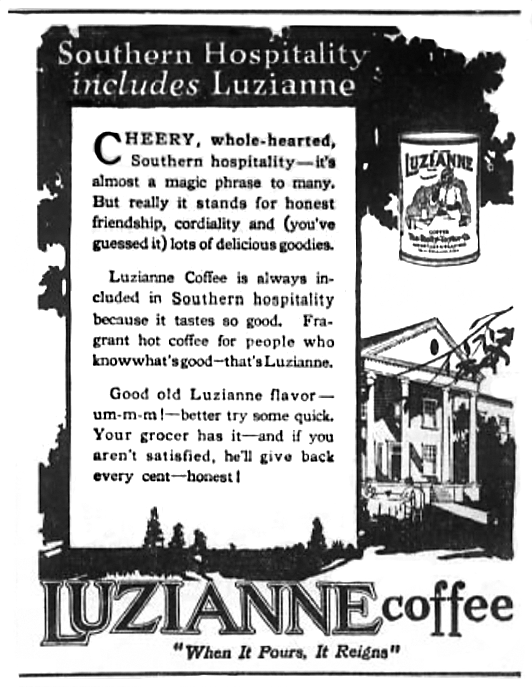
Newspaper advertisement, 1918

In the late 1890s, William B. Reily was operating a wholesale grocery company in Monroe, Louisiana. Noticing the high demand for coffee products, Reily decided to move south to New Orleans to start a business that would roast, grind, package, and distribute canned coffee. In December 1902, he started his coffee business, and the Luzianne brand was born.

Although William Reily began selling tea products under the Luzianne name just one year after opening his coffee business, his focus remained squarely on the roasting and distribution of his coffee products. Over the next 30 years, the popularity of iced tea grew stronger, especially in the South, due in part to the continued proliferation of refrigerators and, consequently, the production of ice.

In 1932, recognizing the popularity of iced tea, Reily began brewing a tea made specifically for iced tea called Luzianne Iced Tea. Although the Reily family has continued to roast and sell coffee under the Luzianne name, Luzianne Iced Tea has become the leading product under that brand, in large part due to the guidance of Reily's sons (William B. Reily, Jr. and James W. Reily) and later his grandson (William B. Reily III).

Little has changed about the original flavor of Luzianne Iced Tea since 1932, but product extensions have been developed by the Reily Foods Company to meet consumer demand for flavored teas. Reily Foods first developed and distributed Peach Mango and Raspberry flavorings, which were liquid concentrations that were added to original Luzianne Iced Tea to give added fruit flavor. Most recently, Reily has begun selling a line of fruit-flavored teas (lemon, raspberry, peach) with the flavor already added to the bag.

As a young actress in the 1950s, Betty White appeared in multiple television advertisements. Oscar-winning actor Burl Ives appeared in a number of frequently aired television commercials for Luzianne Tea during the 1970s and 1980s.

== Products ==
Iced Tea

- Luzianne Iced Tea
- Luzianne Decaf Iced Tea
- Luzianne Green Iced Tea
- Luzianne Peach Iced Tea
- Luzianne Raspberry Iced Tea
- Luzianne Lemon Iced Tea
- Luzianne Iced Tea Flavoring – Peach Mango
- Luzianne Iced Tea Flavoring – Raspberry

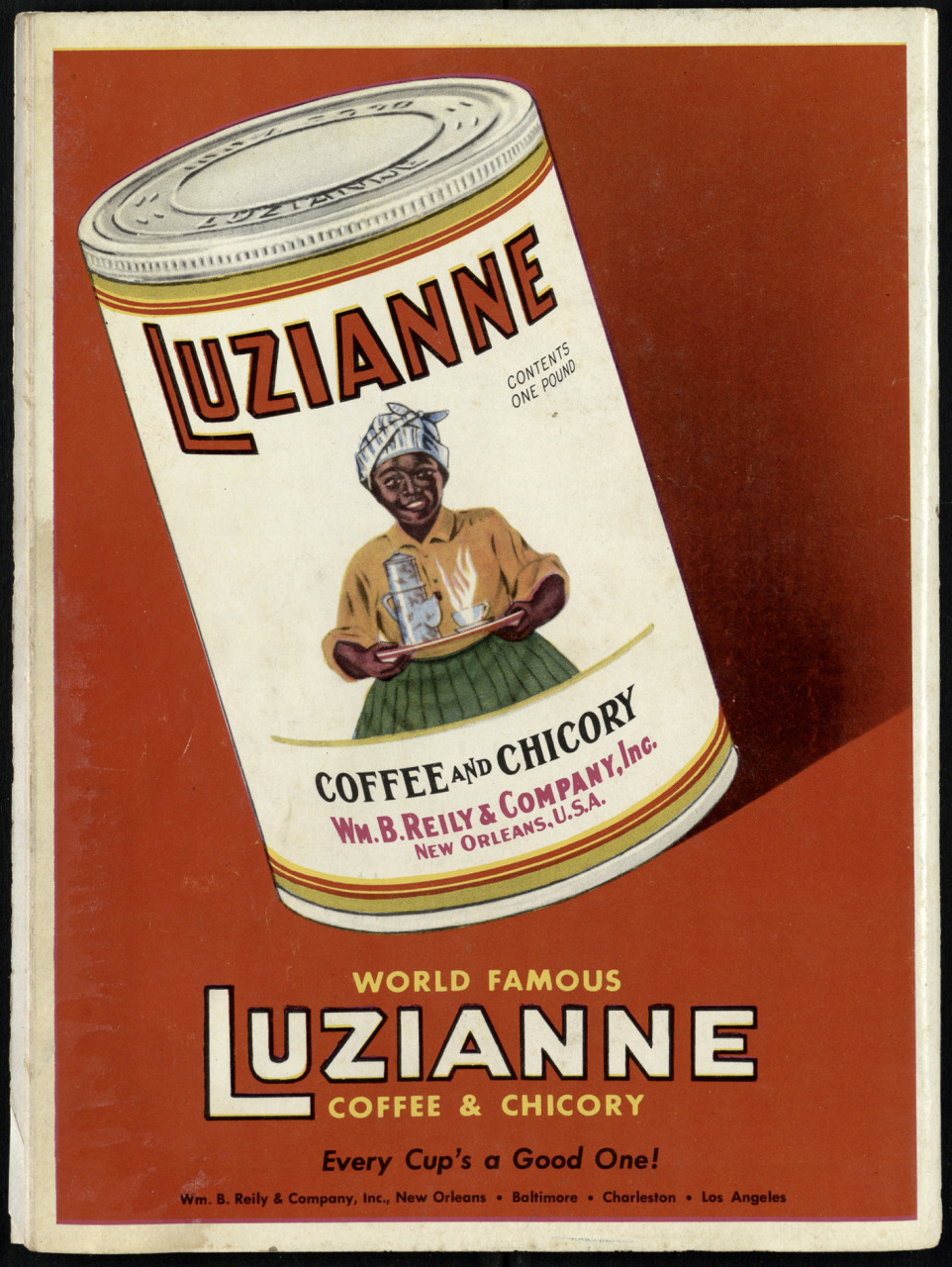
1956 advertisement for Luzianne Coffee and Chicory

Coffee

- Luzianne White Label Dark Roast Coffee & Chicory
- Luzianne Red Label "For All Coffeemakers" Coffee & Chicory
- Luzianne Premium Blend Medium Roast Drip Grind Coffee & Chicory

Cajun Seasoning and Meals

- Luzianne Cajun Chicken Coating
- Luzianne Cajun Seafood Coating
- Luzianne Cajun Seasoning
- Luzianne Cajun Creole Dinner – Dirty Rice
- Luzianne Cajun Creole Dinner – Creole
- Luzianne Cajun Creole Dinner – Etouffee
- Luzianne Cajun Creole Dinner – Gumbo
- Luzianne Cajun Creole Dinner – Jambalaya
