= Audubon Place (New Orleans) =

Street in New Orleans, Louisiana, United States

Coordinates: 29.93760861698163°N 90.12324736196747°W

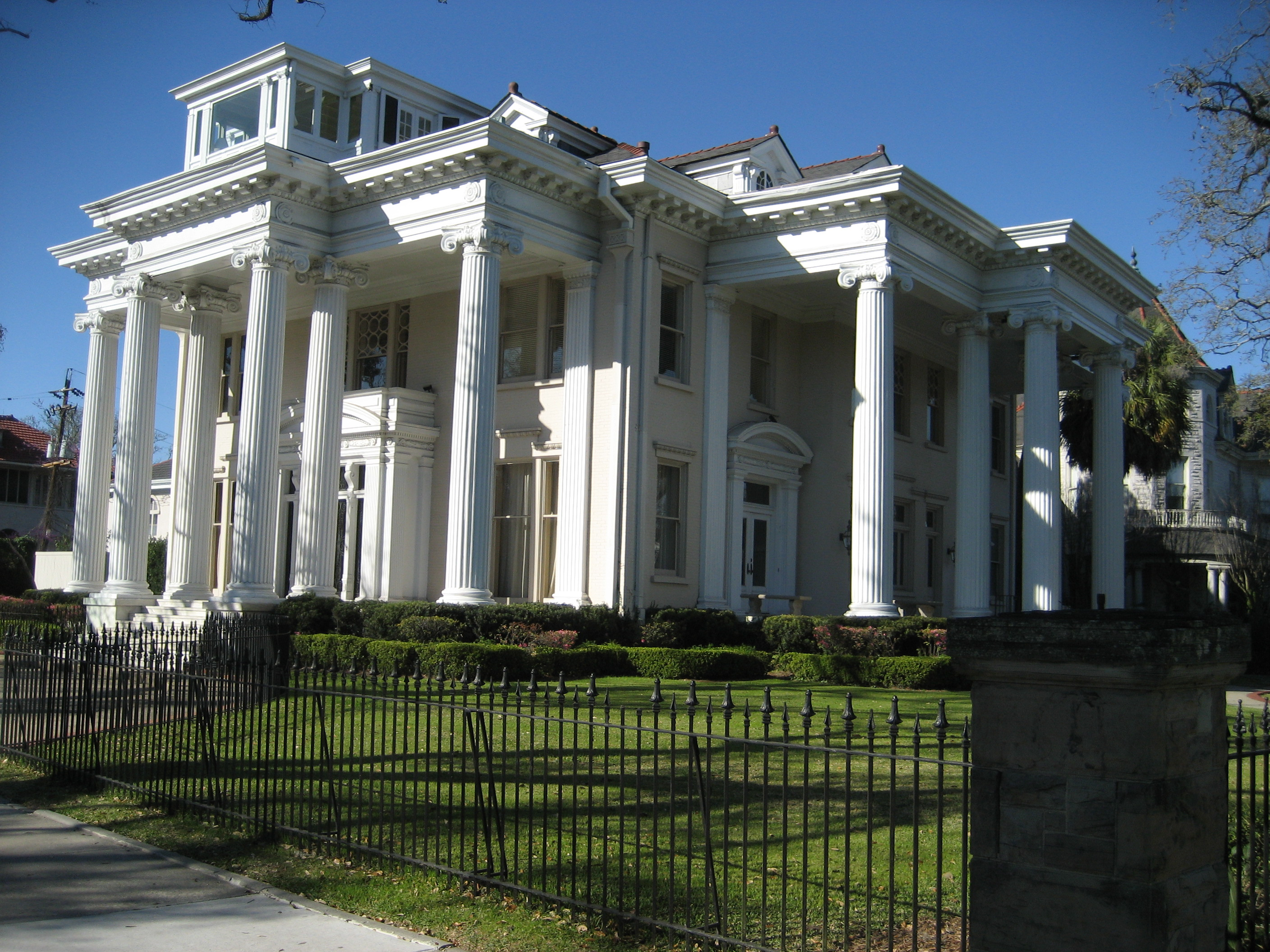
The President of Tulane University lives in this university-owned house at the entrance of Audubon Place.

Audubon Place is a privately gated street in New Orleans, adjacent to Tulane University, and across St. Charles Avenue from Audubon Park.

It was developed starting in the 1890s as an exclusive luxury development where only homes above a certain size and price could be constructed.

As of 2009, Audubon Place homes typically cost around US $5 million. A guardhouse sits at the entrance to the street, with entrance restricted to those on a pre-approved list. Following the 2005 Hurricane Katrina-related levee breach, Blackwater security personnel were helicoptered to Audubon Place to protect property; flood waters did not inundate the street, because the street is above sea level. Audubon Place is immediately across from Audubon Park. The street lies within the 70118 ZIP code.

Among recent residents of Audubon Place was Tom Benson, who owned the city's NFL and NBA teams, the Saints and Pelicans, when he died in 2018. The president of Tulane University lives on the street in a mansion donated to the university by Sam Zemurray, one-time head of United Fruit, predecessor to today's Chiquita.

Audubon Place is not to be confused with Audubon Street or Audubon Boulevard, both of which are also in the neighborhood surrounding Tulane University and Audubon Park. All of the streets are named after John James Audubon, naturalist and long-time New Orleans resident.

== See also ==
- List of streets of New Orleans
