= Tulane/Gravier, New Orleans =

Tulane/Gravier
- New Orleans Neighborhood
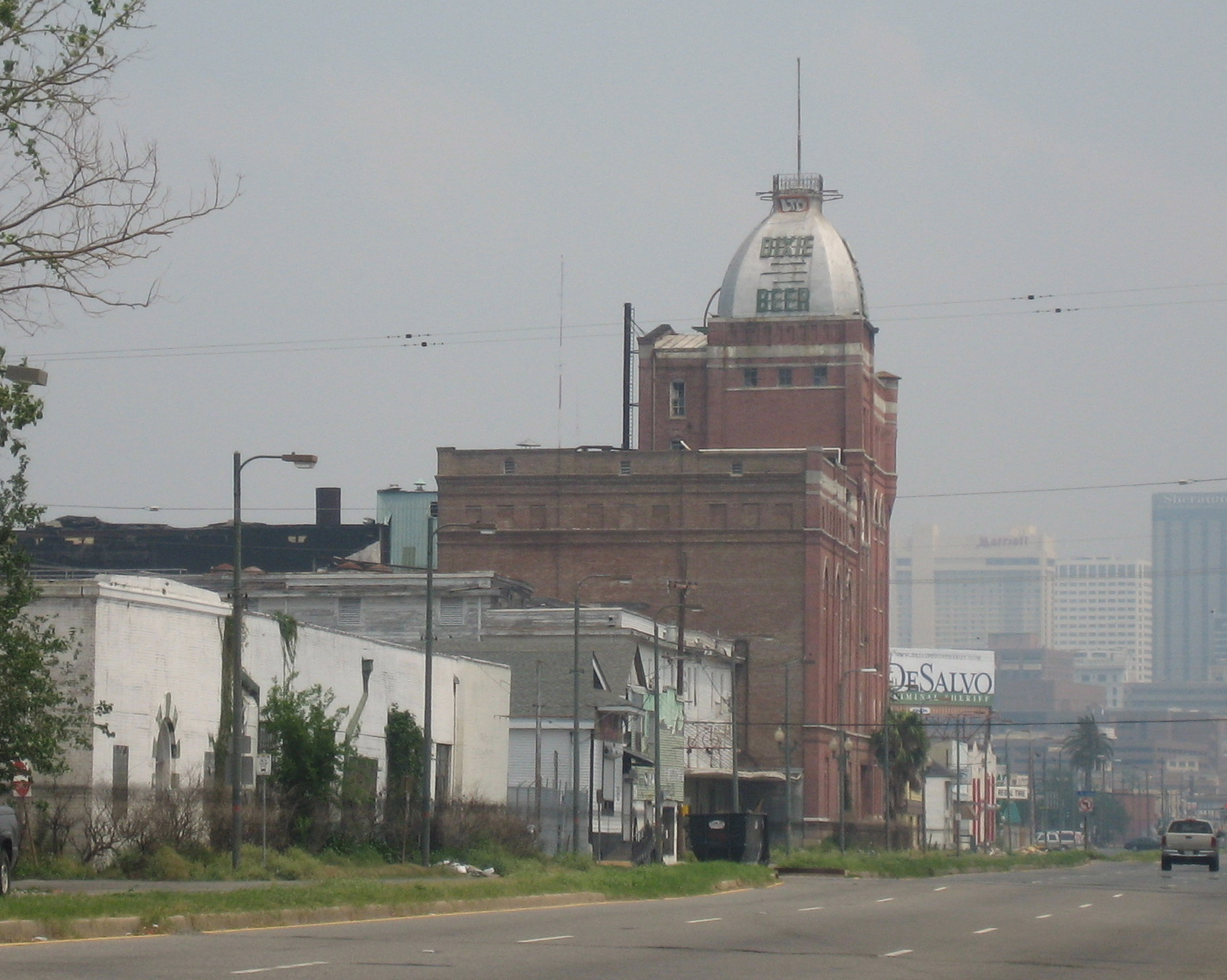
- The Dixie Brewery on Tulane Avenue
- Interactive map of Tulane/Gravier
- Coordinates: 29°57′34″N 90°05′05″W
- Country: United States
- State: Louisiana
- City: New Orleans
- Planning District: District 4, Mid-City District

Area
  - Total: 0.71 sq mi (1.8 km^{2})
  - Land: 0.71 sq mi (1.8 km^{2})
  - Water: 0.00 sq mi (0 km^{2})
- Elevation: 0 ft (0 m)

Population (2010)
  - Total: 1,684
  - Density: 2,400/sq mi (920/km^{2})
- Time zone: UTC-6 (CST)
  - Summer (DST): UTC-5 (CDT)
- Area code: 504

Tulane/Gravier is a neighborhood of the city of New Orleans, Louisiana, U.S. A subdistrict of the Mid-City District Area, its boundaries as defined by the New Orleans City Planning Commission are: St. Louis Street to the north, North Claiborne Avenue, Iberville Street, North and South Derbigny Street, Cleveland Street, South Claiborne Avenue to the east, the Pontchartrain Expressway to the south and South Broad Street to the west.

Landmarks in the area include St. Joseph's Church, University Hospital, the Deutsches Haus, and the Falstaff and Dixie Breweries (both now closed).

== Geography ==
According to the United States Census Bureau, the district has a total area of 0.71 square miles (1.8 km^{2}), 0.71 square miles (1.8 km^{2}) of which is land and 0.00 square miles (0.0 km^{2}) (0.0%) of which is water.

=== Adjacent neighborhoods ===
- Tremé (north)
- Iberville Projects (east)
- Central Business District (east)
- Calliope Projects (south)
- Mid-City (west)

=== Boundaries ===
The New Orleans City Planning Commission defines the boundaries of Tulane/Gravier as these streets: St. Louis Street, North Claiborne Avenue, Iberville Street, North Derbigny Street, South Derbigny Street, Cleveland Street, South Claiborne Avenue, the Pontchartrain Expressway and South Broad Street.

== Demographics ==
As of the census of 2000, there were 4,234 people, 1,583 households, and 818 families living in the neighborhood. The population density was 8,963 /mi^{2} (2,352 /km^{2}).

As of the census of 2010, there were 3,649 people, 1,222 households, and 570 families living in the neighborhood.

== See also ==
- New Orleans neighborhoods
- List of streets of New Orleans
