= Carondelet Canal =

Canal in New Orleans, 1794–1920s

The Carondelet Canal, also known as the Old Basin Canal, was a canal in New Orleans, Louisiana, U.S.A., operating from 1794 into the 1920s – nearly 135 years.

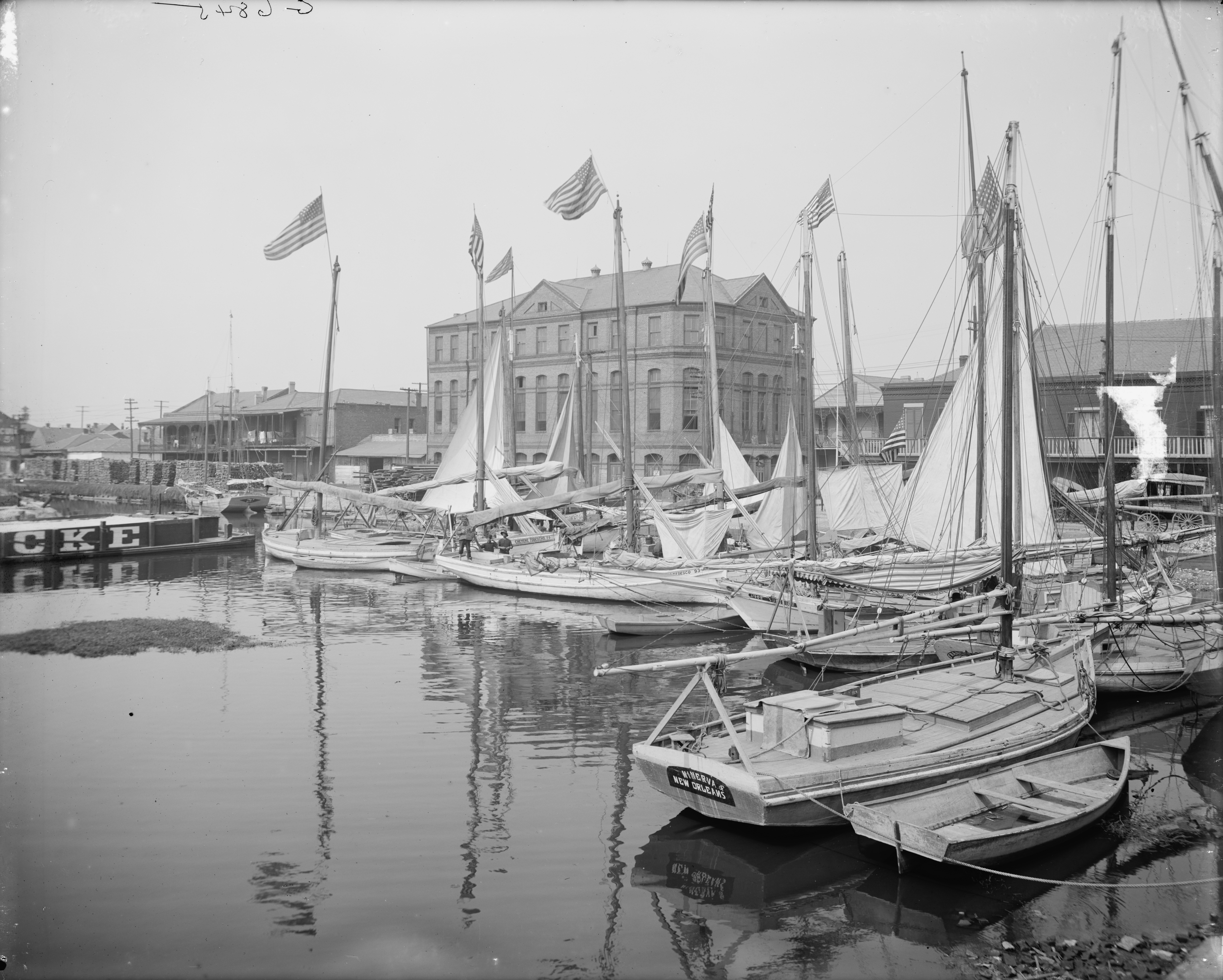
Carondelet Canal turning basin in the early 20th century

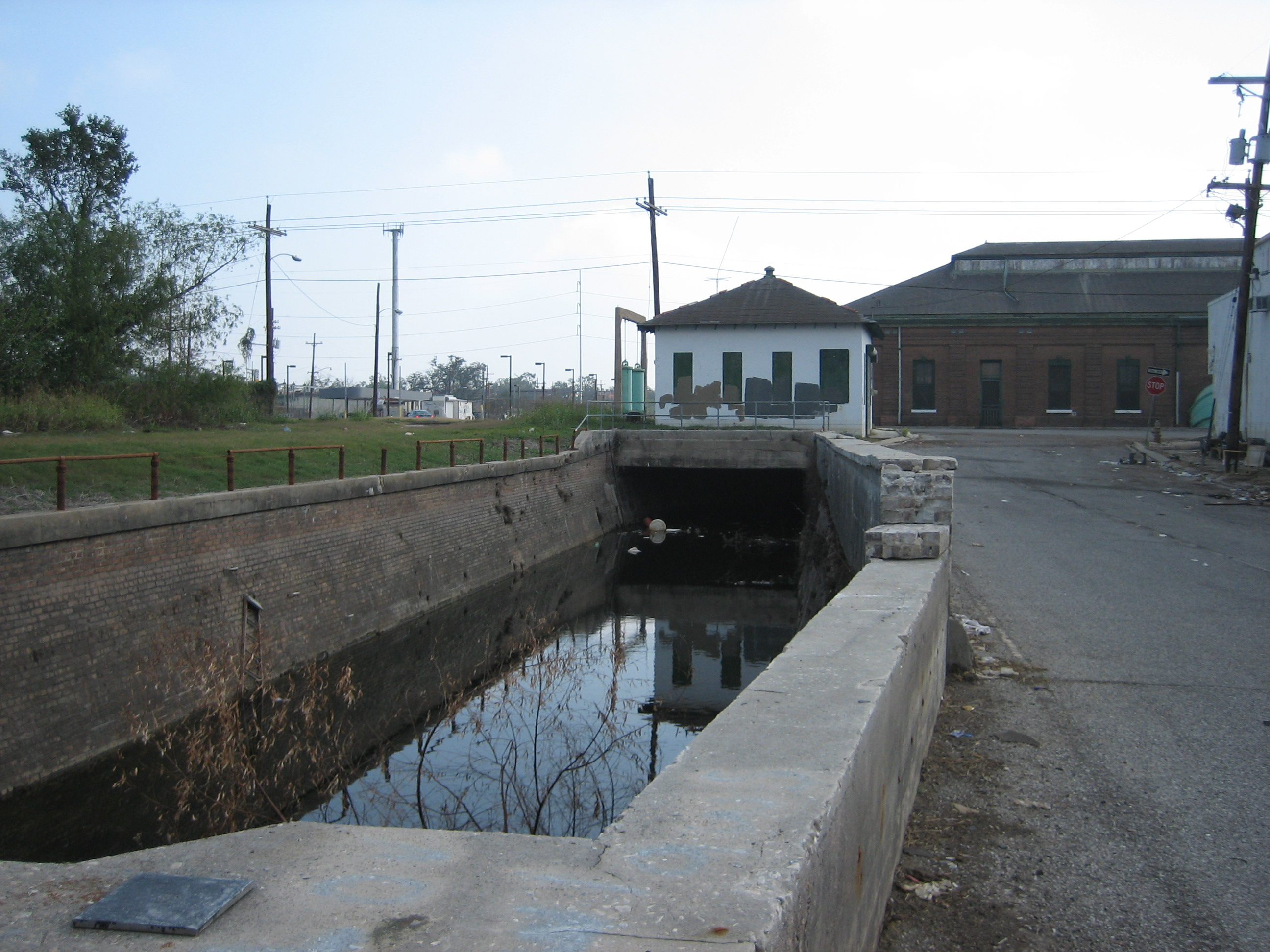
This drainage canal, in use in the early 20th century, in back of a Broad Street pumping station near St. Louis Street, ran parallel to the old Carondelet Canal, which was located alongside nearby Lafitte Street.

Construction of the canal began in June 1794, on the orders of the Spanish Governor of Louisiana, Francisco Luis Héctor de Carondelet, for whom the canal was named. Construction was accomplished by the forced labor of convicts and by slaves whose work was donated by townspeople. The 1.6 mile-long canal started at Bayou St. John, which connected with Lake Pontchartrain, and went inland to what was then the back edge of New Orleans, behind the French Quarter in the Tremé neighborhood. The first shallow, narrow version of the canal was completed by the end of 1794. Over the next two years, further work made the canal wider and deeper. The canal officially opened in 1796, serving dual purposes of drainage and shipping, but when Carondelet was transferred away from Louisiana the next year, the canal fell into neglect.

After the United States' purchase of Louisiana, James Pitot worked to promote improvements of the canal. Starting in 1805, the Orleans Navigation Company improved the Canal and the Bayou, making it more important for shipping.

The 80,000-square-foot (7,400 m^{2}) turning basin at the head of the Canal inspired the naming of Basin Street in New Orleans. Plans to build a connecting canal from the turning basin to the Mississippi River were never realized, in part because of the engineering challenges. Canal locks would have been needed due to the water level differences between the River and the Lake. Plans for that never-built canal influenced the name of Canal Street in the city. (The dream of a Lake-to-River canal was finally realized a century later with the construction of the Industrial Canal).

By the early 1820s, 70 to 80 vessels were reported using the Canal daily. In the early 19th century, the Francophone Creole section of the city was in competition with the Anglophone uptown section; businessmen of the latter section constructed the competing New Basin Canal in the 1830s.

By the time of the American Civil War, the New Basin Canal was doing more than twice the business of the Carondelet, by then often referred to as the "Old Basin Canal." Larger ships too big to use the canal became more common in the late 19th century, but the Carondelet Canal was still economically important into the early decades of the 20th century. During this period it was important for the oyster boat business.

Early monarchs of the Zulu Social Aid & Pleasure Club Mardi Gras krewe made their entrance on the waters of the Old Basin Canal.

After World War I, use of the Canal declined further. The City of New Orleans purchased the canal in 1924 and began the process of filling it the next year.

Today the entire length of the former canal is part of the Lafitte Greenway.

== See also ==
- Drainage in New Orleans
