= Reily Foods Company =

Company

- Type: Private
- Industry: Food & Beverages
- Founded: 1902
- Headquarters: New Orleans, LA, USA
- Key people: Wm. B. Reily IV, President & CEO
- Products: See brands listing.
- Website: http://www.reilyproducts.com/site.php

Reily Foods Company is the primary division of Wm. B. Reily & Company Inc. and specializes in selling food and beverages. The company started in the coffee and tea business and has diversified through to include condiments, dressings, seasonings, and baking products. Luzianne Iced Tea is available nationally while other products have greater distribution and demand in the Southern United States. The Reily Foods Company is headquartered in the Central Business District of New Orleans, Louisiana.

== History ==
William B. Reily began his career in the grocery and packaged goods business in the late 1870s as a country store clerk in Bastrop, LA. After spending eight years in that position, Reily decided to open his own retail grocery store. Only two years later, Reily moved 25 miles south to Monroe, LA where he started the Southern Grocery Company, Inc., a wholesale grocery business. During this time he noticed the popularity of his coffee products and realized that he could create a profitable coffee roasting business. After 14 years of building and running his successful wholesale business in Monroe, Reily moved to New Orleans to start what would become the Reily Foods Company.

On December 11, 1902, Reily and his partners began their coffee roasting, grinding and distributing company in New Orleans. At the time, more than 85% of all coffee beans imported into the United States passed through New Orleans so it gave Reily first choice of the best coffee beans available. Later the next year, the company added to its products offerings as a convenience to its customers. Both his coffee and tea products were sold under the Luzianne (a regional pronunciation of Louisiana) brand name that he created. In 1906 the company was renamed the Reily Taylor Company and then later, in 1919, became Wm. B. Reily & Co., Inc.

In 1932, noticing the increased popularity of iced tea, especially in the South, Reily and his sons created a blend of tea made specifically to be used for iced tea. Luzianne Iced Tea has since become the cornerstone product of the company and the second best selling iced tea in the United States.

== Major acquisitions ==
For the first half of the 20th century, Wm. B. Reily & Co. and the Reily Foods Company remained a producer of only Luzianne coffee and tea products. It wasn't until its 1965 acquisition of the JFG Coffee Company that Reily Foods began diversifying their product offerings. Though JFG brought with them mostly coffee brands and production facilities, Reily also acquired a small regional mayonnaise brand. Three years later, Reily acquired CDM coffee from Blue Plate Foods, a wildly popular brand of coffee in New Orleans that had been around since before the start of the 20th century.

In 1974, Reily purchased Blue Plate Foods from the Hunt-Wesson Company, which added Blue Plate Mayonnaise to their list of brands. Blue Plate was one of the first commercially prepared mayonnaises and is one of the most popular brands of mayonnaise in the South. Over the next 30 years, Reily acquired several brands from both regional and national companies. They include Swans Down Cake Flour, Try Me Sauces & Seasonings (namely Tiger Sauce), Wick Fowler's 2-Alarm Chili, La Martinique Salad Dressings, Carroll Shelby's Original Texas-Style Chili, Presto Cake Flour, No Pudge Fat Free Brownie Mix, French Market Coffees, New England Tea & Coffee.

== The Reily family ==
Throughout its 100+ years of existence, the Wm. B. Reily & Company and the Reily Foods Company has been run by a member of the Reily family. From 1902 to 1932, William B. Reily led the company from a startup coffee roasting company to one of the region's top suppliers of coffee and tea products. From 1932 to 1968, his two sons (William B. Reily Jr. and James W. Reily) took control of the company, leading it to rapid expansion in the coffee and tea markets. In 1968, William B. Reily III took control of the company and in the years since has led the diversification of its product offerings through product innovations and acquisitions. Currently, the fourth generation of family, Wm. B. Reily IV, serves as President & CEO of the parent company, Wm. B. Reily & Co., Inc. The family home of Wm B Reily, Kalorama, in Collinston Louisiana 5 miles south of Bastrop is now a nature preserve open to the public, and has been added to the national register of historic places

== Brands ==
- Luzianne
  - Luzianne Iced Tea
  - Luzianne Coffees
  - Luzianne Cajun Foods
- French Market Coffees
- New England Tea & Coffee
- Bonus Blend Coffees
- JFG Coffees
- JFG Mayonnaise
- Coffee Partner Ground Chicory
- Blue Plate Mayonnaise
- La Martinique Dressings
- Try Me Sauces & Seasoning
- Carroll Shelby Chili
- Wick Fowler Chili
- Swans Down Cake Flour
- Presto Self-Rising Cake Flour
- No Pudge! Fat Free Brownie Mix

== Subsidiaries ==
- Evamor Alkaline Artesian Water
- SIP Technologies

== Notable employees ==
- Lee Harvey Oswald, the accused assassin of President John F. Kennedy, worked briefly at Reily's New Orleans facility in the months before the assassination. Oswald was discharged from his position on July 19, 1963.

In his authoritative and best-selling personal book The Death of a President, author William Manchester mentions Oswald's unsuccessful job with Reily (without naming the company) as the top example of "the bleak truth was that he couldn't do anything right" and then added that "bit by bit the sickening truth was emerging; no one wanted him, no one had ever wanted him" in telling Oswald's personal story leading up to November 22, 1963.
