= Camp Street =

Street in New Orleans

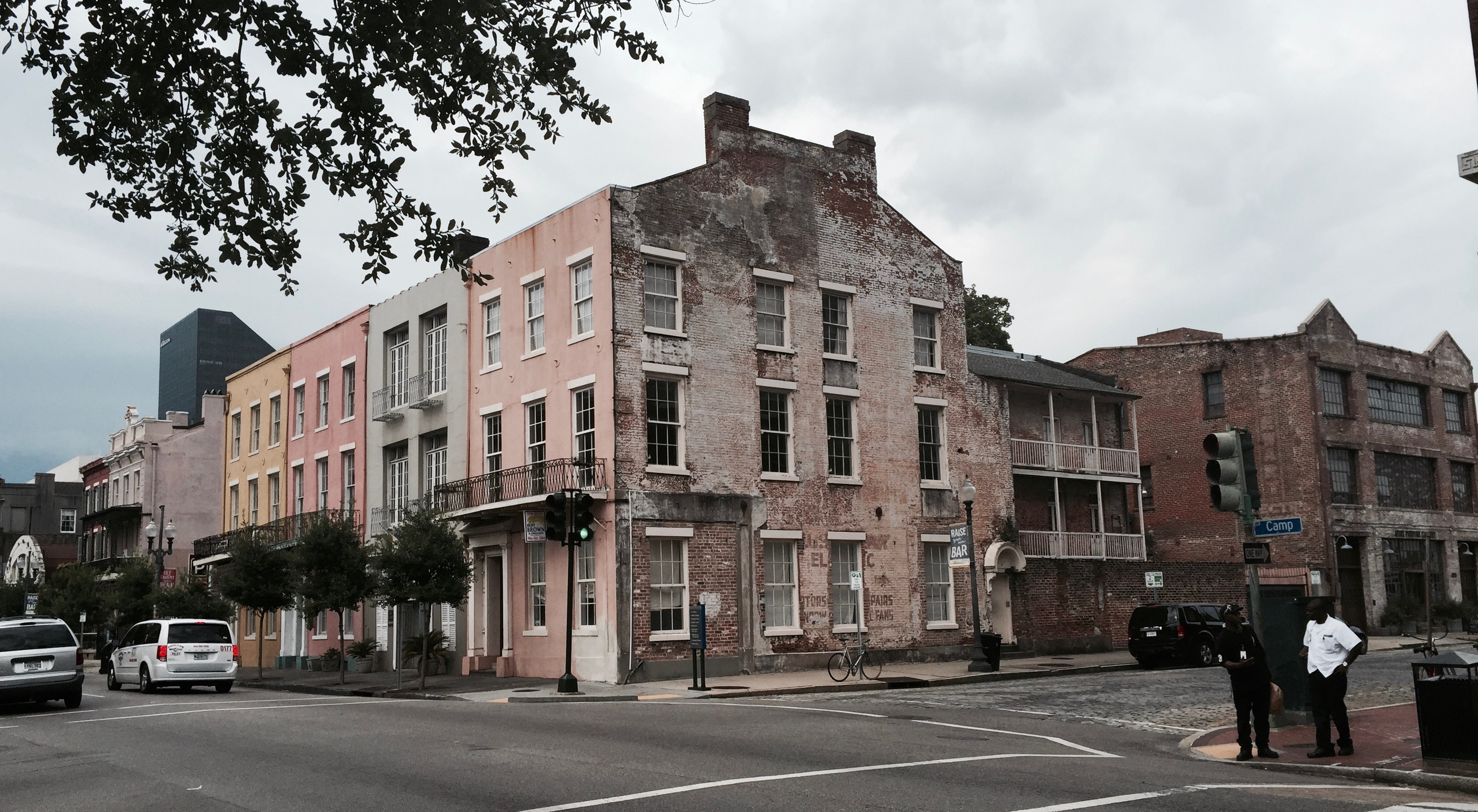
Camp Street (2015)

Camp Street is a street in New Orleans, Louisiana, United States. The name was originally the Spanish Campo de Negros. According to one study of urban American slavery, it may have been so named because it was the dwelling place of free people of color who migrated to New Orleans after the Haitian Revolution, or it may have been named because it was a key location for the New Orleans slave market. The "Negro Camp," in its earliest days, "opened upon the Terre commune, or Common ground," which gave its name to Common Street. The first gaslights in New Orleans were installed in the Camp Street Theatre in 1833. It is known today for its preserved shotgun houses.
