= Bayou St. John =

Bayou Saint John
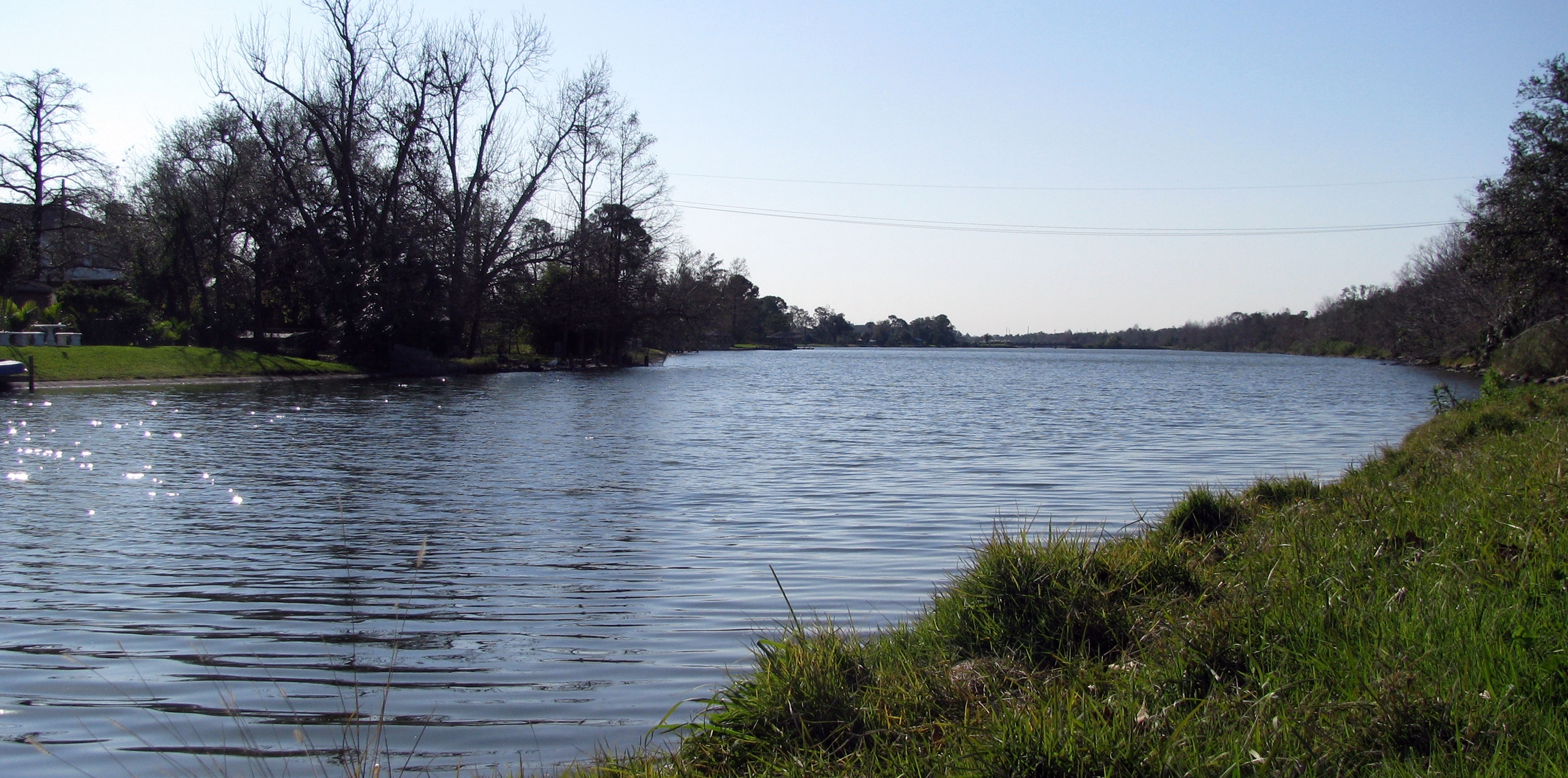
- Bayou St. John by the Spanish fort
- Native name: Bayouk Choupic (Houma language)

Location
- Country: United States
- Location: Louisiana

Physical characteristics
- Source
  - location: New Orleans
  - coordinates: 29°58′24″N 90°05′29″W
  - elevation: 0 ft (0 m)
- Mouth
  - location: Lake Pontchartrain
  - coordinates: 30°01′38″N 90°04′58″W

Bayou St. John (French: Bayou Saint-Jean) is a bayou within the city of New Orleans, Louisiana.

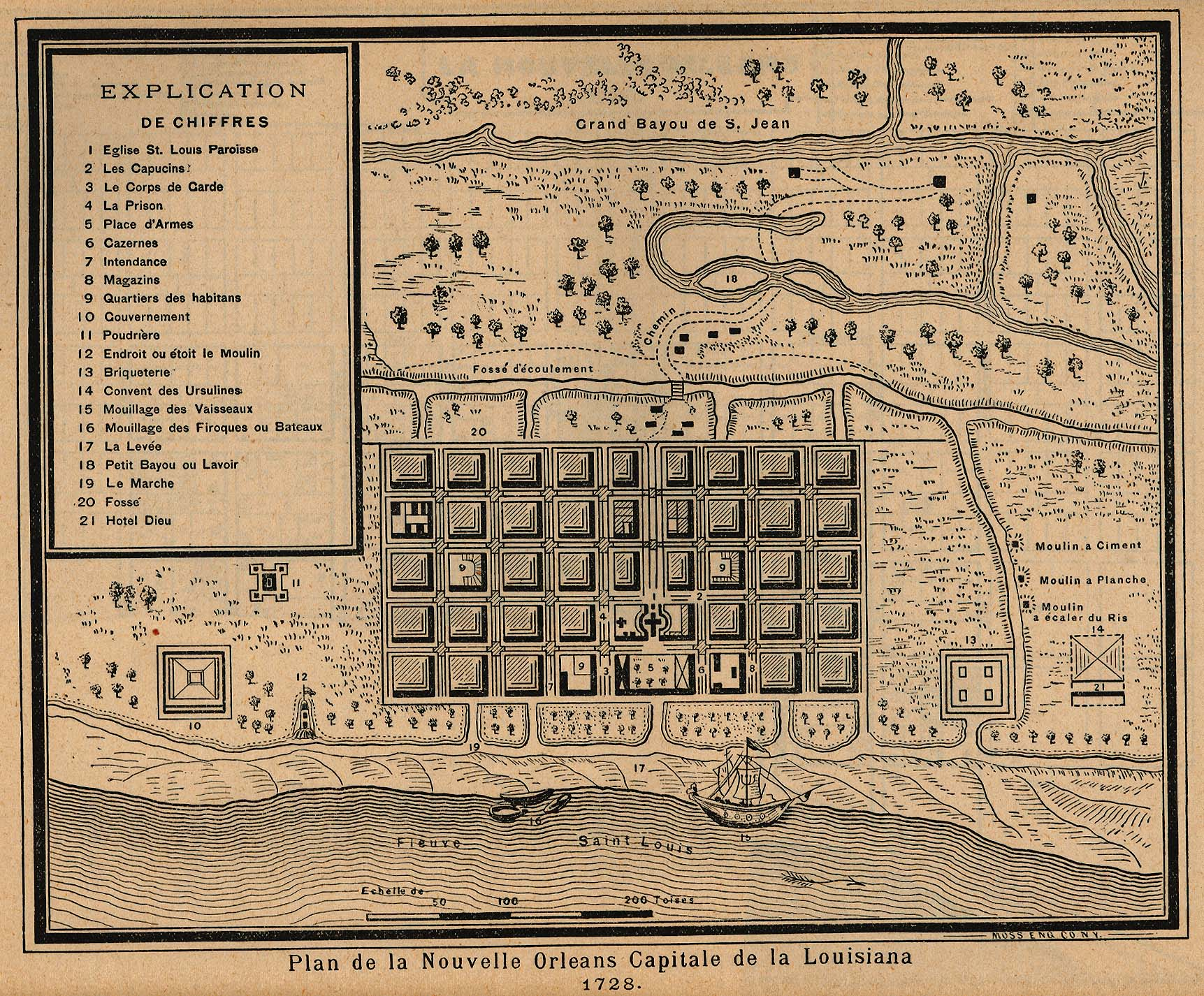
The grand Bayou St. John in 1728.

The Bayou as a natural feature drained the swampy land of a good portion of what was to become New Orleans, into Lake Pontchartrain. In its natural state, it extended much farther than today; 18th- and early 19th-century maps show it had tributaries or branches (at least seasonally) reaching into what are now the Broadmoor neighborhood, the New Orleans Central Business District just back from St. Charles Avenue above Lee Circle, the Carrollton neighborhood, the Treme neighborhood, and a branch connecting to Bayou Gentilly.

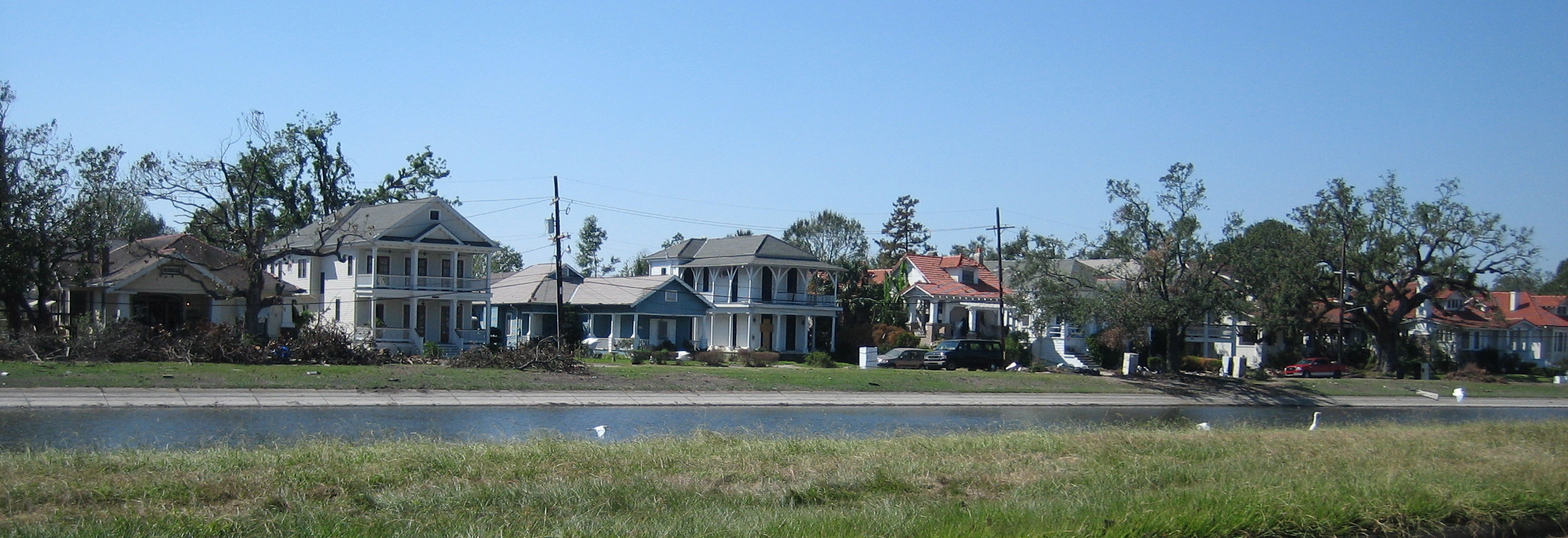
Egrets along Bayou St. John, October, 2005

The portion still in existence today was navigable by canoes and similar small vessels, used by Native Americans since pre-Columbian times. The natives knew the waterway as Bayouk Choupic. There was a portage between the Bayou and the Mississippi River due to the difference in water level between the bayou and the level of the sea, which attracted early French explorers, traders, and trappers, some of whom established a small community there by the late 17th century. In 1701 a small fort was established by the French beside the Lake Pontchartrain end of the Bayou to protect this important route; Fort St. Jean would be known to future generations of New Orleanians as "Old Spanish Fort". The Bayou and portage were key factors in the selection of the site where the city was founded in 1718, at the River end of the portage route.

The portage trail along the bayou became the "Grand Route St. John" which eventually was replaced by the wide, straight Esplanade Avenue. After the destructive hurricanes of 1778 and 1779, the charitable Bayou plantation owner, Don Andres Almonester, rebuilt the Charity Hospital. Earlier Almonester had founded a leper's hospital near the portage road prior to the construction of the important Carondelet waterway. After the Louisiana Purchase in 1803, the Carondelet Canal was dug to connect the back of the city (when it was limited to the strip of land along the Mississippi River) with the Bayou, and the Bayou was dredged to accommodate larger vessels.

In the 19th century, an area along Bayou St. John was reputedly the location of many voodoo rituals by Marie Laveau. The Magnolia Bridge over the Bayou continues to serve as a site for such rituals every St. John's Eve.

During the first half of the 20th century, commercial use of the Bayou declined and the Carondelet Canal was filled in. Some New Orleanians began living in houseboats on the Bayou. Complaints from residents of nearby neighborhoods and sanitation concerns led to this practice being outlawed in the 1930s. A Works Progress Administration project cleaned up and beautified the area. A lock was installed near the Lake Pontchartrain end. In the summer of 1955, the New Orleans Sewerage and Water Board temporarily drained the Bayou, to clean out debris and material that was causing foul odors.

Since then, the Bayou has been a picturesque body of water with small earthen levees on either side, forming a narrow park space in the city. From the mid-20th century on, the banks of the Bayou across from City Park became a favorite destination for young couples seeking privacy. The banks of Bayou St. John are an important meeting place for the downtown Mardi Gras Indian tribes for their "Super Sunday" parade after Carnival.

Officially opened in 2015, the Lafitte Greenway now runs along the corridor previously occupied by the Carondelet Canal, with a prominent roundabout at the foot of the Bayou. In conjunction with the Lafitte Greenway, the Bayou has been recognized as part of the EPA's Urban Waters Partnership.

== See also ==
- Bayou St. John submarine
- Demourelles Island
