= Riverfront Streetcar Line =

Transit line in New Orleans, Louisiana

49 Riverfront
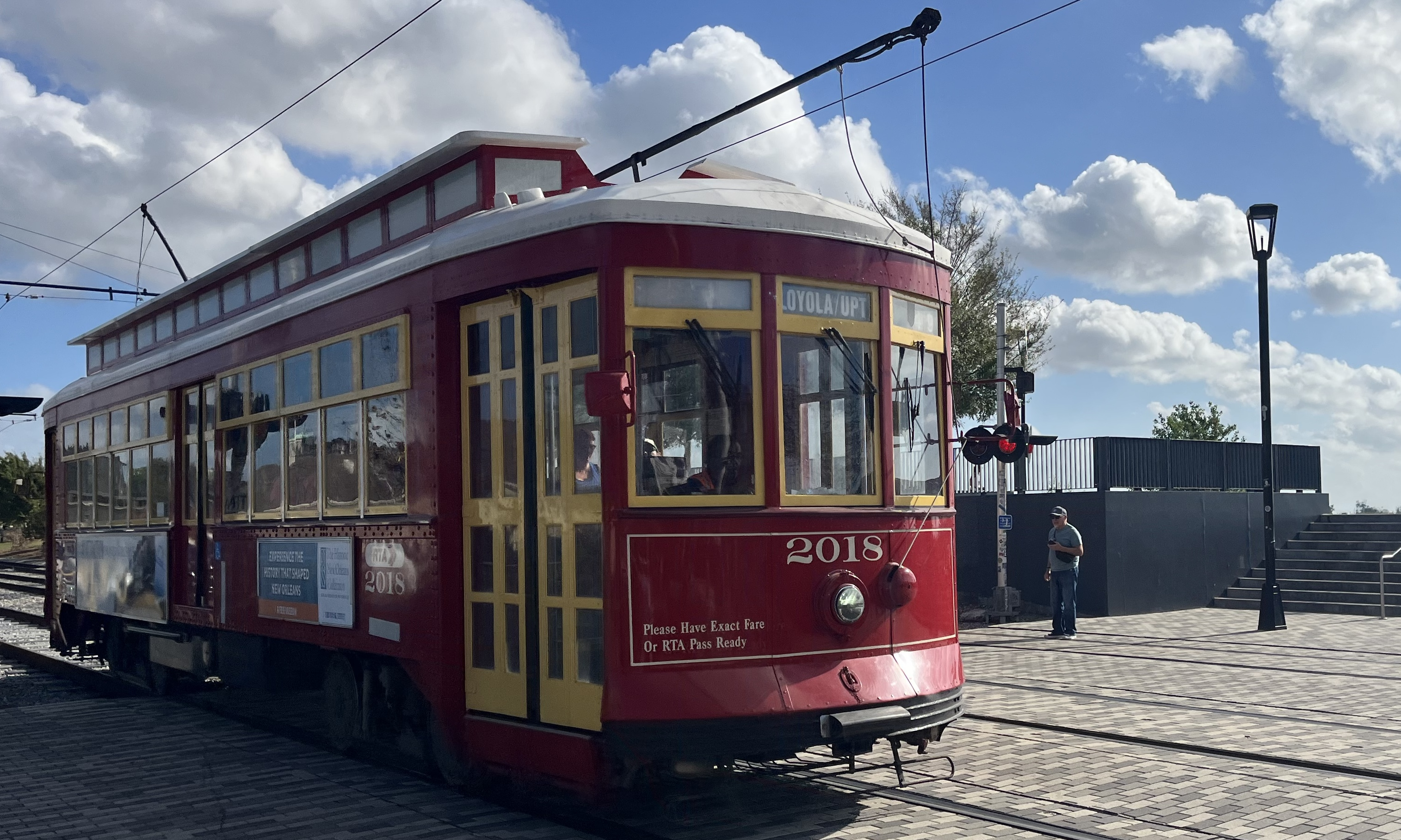
- A 2000 series streetcar operating on the Riverfront line near the Canal Street ferry terminal

Overview
- Owner: New Orleans Regional Transit Authority
- Line number: 49
- Locale: New Orleans, Louisiana
- Termini: French Market; John Churchill Chase
- Stations: 8

Service
- Type: Heritage streetcar
- System: Streetcars in New Orleans
- Depot: A. Philip Randolph Operations Facility
- Rolling stock: 2000 series

History
- Opened: August 14, 1988; 38 years ago
- Partly Closed: July 29, 2018; 8 years ago
- Reopened: June 1, 2025; 15 months ago

Technical
- Line length: 1.3 mi (2.1 km)
- Number of tracks: 2
- Character: Exclusive right-of-way
- Track gauge: 5 ft 2 1/2 in (1,588 mm)
- Old gauge: 4 ft 8 1/2 in (1,435 mm) standard gauge
- Electrification: Overhead line, 600 V DC

The Riverfront Streetcar Line is a streetcar route in New Orleans, Louisiana, operated by the New Orleans Regional Transit Authority (RTA). It opened on August 14, 1988, becoming the first new streetcar line in the city in 62 years. The route runs for 2 miles (3.2 km) along the east bank of the Mississippi River, between Esplanade Avenue in the French Quarter and Julia Street near the New Orleans Convention Center.

Unlike other RTA streetcar lines, the Riverfront line operates on an exclusive right-of-way adjacent to the New Orleans Public Belt Railroad, making it more similar in function to a light rail service. It was originally constructed with standard gauge track, but was regauged in 1997 to the wider Pennsylvania trolley gauge to standardize the track gauge across the RTA's streetcar system. The line was initially designated as Route 2, but was redesignated Route 49 on June 1, 2025.

Due to service disruptions caused by the Hard Rock Hotel collapse and ongoing construction at the nearby Four Seasons Hotel, the Riverfront line was temporarily merged with the Loyola–UPT line in 2021 to form the Loyola–Riverfront Streetcar Line (Route 49), a configuration that remained in place until June 1, 2025. The line is represented by the color blue in most RTA publications.

== History ==
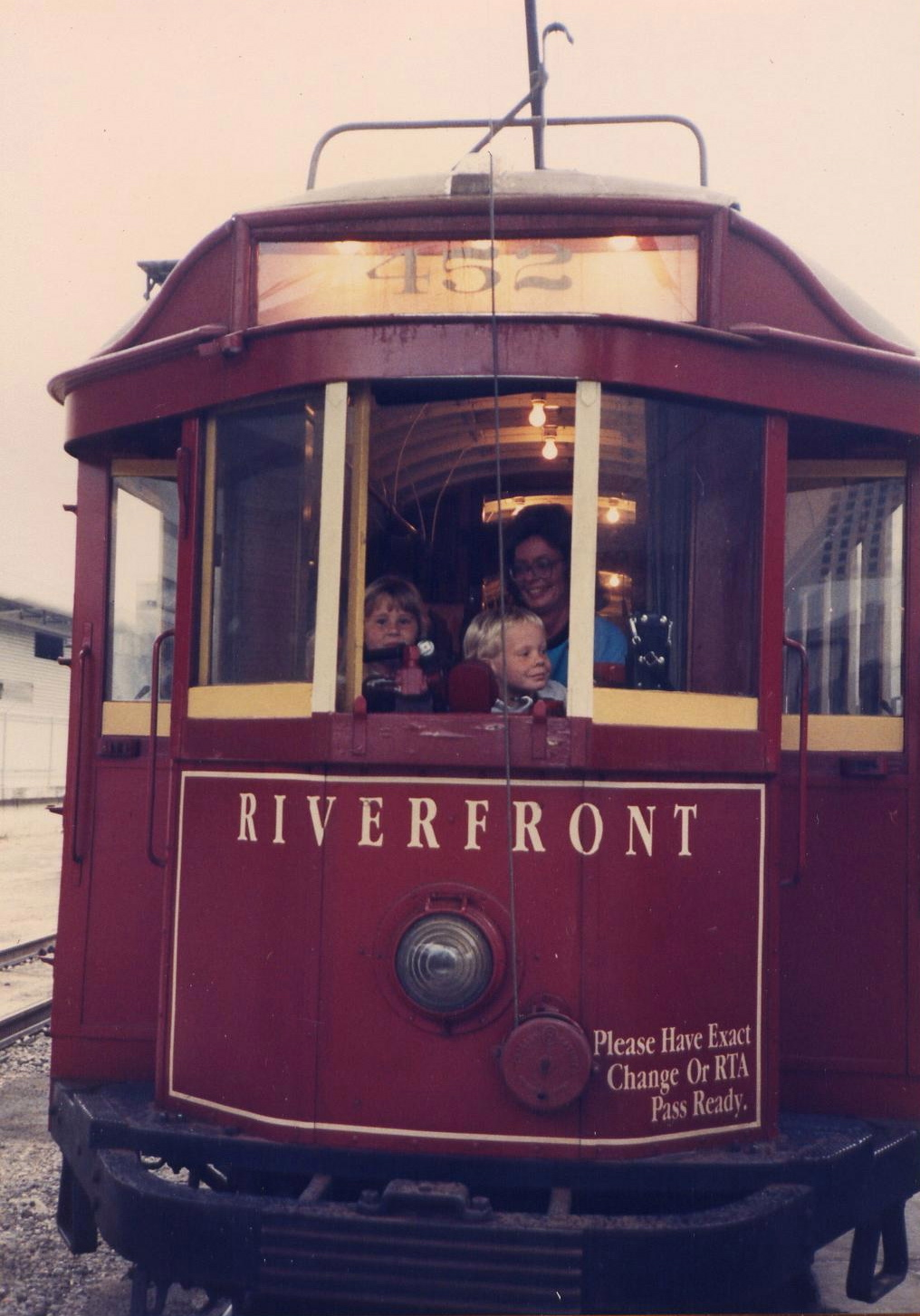
Riverfront Streetcar in 1988, the line's first year of operation.

The Riverfront Streetcar Line opened on August 14, 1988, becoming the first new streetcar line in New Orleans since 1926. To equip the line, the Regional Transit Authority (RTA) repurchased and refurbished two former Perley Thomas streetcars, originally retired from the Canal line in 1964, and imported two W2-class streetcars from Melbourne, Australia. The Melbourne cars allowed for level boarding and wheelchair access, making the Riverfront line the first in the city to meet modern accessibility standards. By contrast, the historic status of the St. Charles Streetcar Line prohibited modifications to its older cars.

Initially, the line operated as a single track with one passing siding, using 4 ft 8 1/2 in (1,435 mm) standard gauge track. Due to high ridership, the line was temporarily closed in 1990 to install a second track. Two additional streetcars—one more Perley Thomas and another ex-Melbourne car—were added at that time, bringing the fleet to six. The Perley Thomas cars were renumbered 450, 451, and 456 (formerly 924, 919, and 952), while the Melbourne W2 cars became 452, 454, and 455 (formerly 626, 478, and 331).

=== Regauging and fleet modernization ===
By the mid-1990s, the RTA sought to further improve accessibility and standardize on a fleet that used 5 ft 2 1/2 in (1,588 mm) Pennsylvania trolley gauge. This led to the development of new replica streetcars resembling the Perley Thomas design, but built with modern components. The first of these, car 457, was rebuilt from car 957 with an added wheelchair lift. Six additional cars (458–463) were constructed from scratch at the Carrollton Shops. Although two of the initial replicas used salvaged PCC components from retired Philadelphia trolleys, all seven were eventually outfitted with modern trucks and controls from the Czech manufacturer ČKD Tatra.

Concurrent with the fleet modernization, the Riverfront line was regauged in 1997 to Pennsylvania trolley gauge, matching the gauge used on the St. Charles line. A connecting track was also constructed along Canal Street to enable vehicle transfers between the lines and to allow Riverfront cars to be serviced at the Carrollton Shops. The final day of standard-gauge operation was September 6, 1997, after which the older Perley Thomas and Melbourne cars were retired. The Melbourne cars were later transferred to the Memphis Area Transit Authority for use on that city's Main Street Trolley line, while one Perley Thomas car was sent to the San Francisco Municipal Railway and the others were stored. The Riverfront line reopened on December 13, 1997, operating with the new broad-gauge cars.

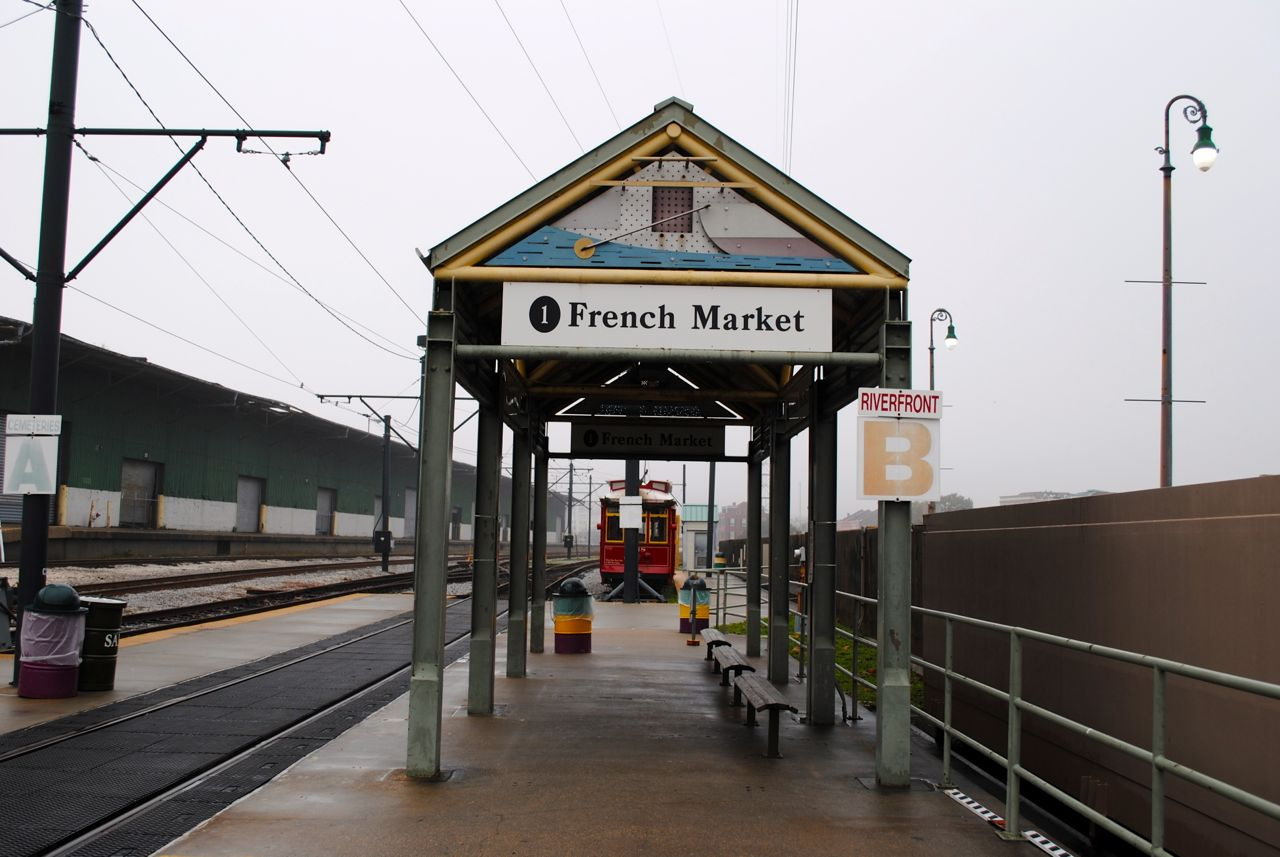
Typical station design on the Riverfront line

=== Closure and rerouting ===
On July 29, 2018, the section between Canal Street and John Churchill Chase was closed due to redevelopment of the former World Trade Center New Orleans building into the Four Seasons Hotel and Private Residences New Orleans. Service was temporarily reduced to operate between French Market and Canal Street.

On October 12, 2019, a portion of the Hard Rock Hotel under construction at Canal Street and North Rampart Street collapsed, disrupting Streetcar service systemwide. After the collapse, the Riverfront line was rerouted through the Central Business District, operating via Canal Street to Carondelet Street. As tracks were cleared and repaired, service was extended to Union Passenger Terminal via Loyola Avenue. This rerouting was designated the 49 Loyola/Riverfront line.

=== Reopening ===
Full Riverfront service between French Market and Julia Street resumed on June 1, 2025. At that time, the line inherited the Route 49 designation, and the Loyola/Riverfront line was discontinued. Full service also resumed on the Rampart/Loyola line.

== Service description ==
=== Hours and frequency ===
As of January 2026, the Riverfront Streetcar Line operates daily from 6 a.m. to midnight. During core service hours, from 9 a.m. to 10 p.m., streetcars run every 20 minutes. On weekends, from 10 a.m. to 6 p.m., service increases to every 15 minutes. Outside of these hours, streetcars operate every 30 minutes.

=== Station listing ===
The following table lists the stations of the Riverfront Line, from the French Quarter to the Convention Center area:

Stop	Neighborhood(s)	Other streetcar lines	Notes
French Market	French Quarter		Near the intersection of Peters St and Esplanade Ave. Serves French Market and New Orleans Mint/New Orleans Jazz Museum.
Ursulines St	French Quarter		Serves French Market.
Dumaine St	French Quarter		Serves Jackson Square, Preservation Hall, St. Louis Cathedral and Woldenberg Park.
Toulouse St	French Quarter		Serves Jax Brewery and Woldenberg Park.
Bienville St	French Quarter		Serves Woldenberg Park.
Canal St	Central Business District, French Quarter	47 48	Connects with Canal Street Ferry Terminal. Serves Audubon Aquarium of the Americas, Caesars New Orleans and Woldenberg Park.
Poydras St	Central Business District		Serves The Outlet Collection at Riverwalk.
Julia St	Central Business District		Serves Port of New Orleans, The Outlet Collection at Riverwalk, and Morial Convention Center.
John Churchill Chase	Central Business District		Stop closed. Named for John Churchill Chase.
