= Loyola–Riverfront Streetcar Line =

Historic streetcar line in New Orleans, Louisiana

Loyola–Riverfront
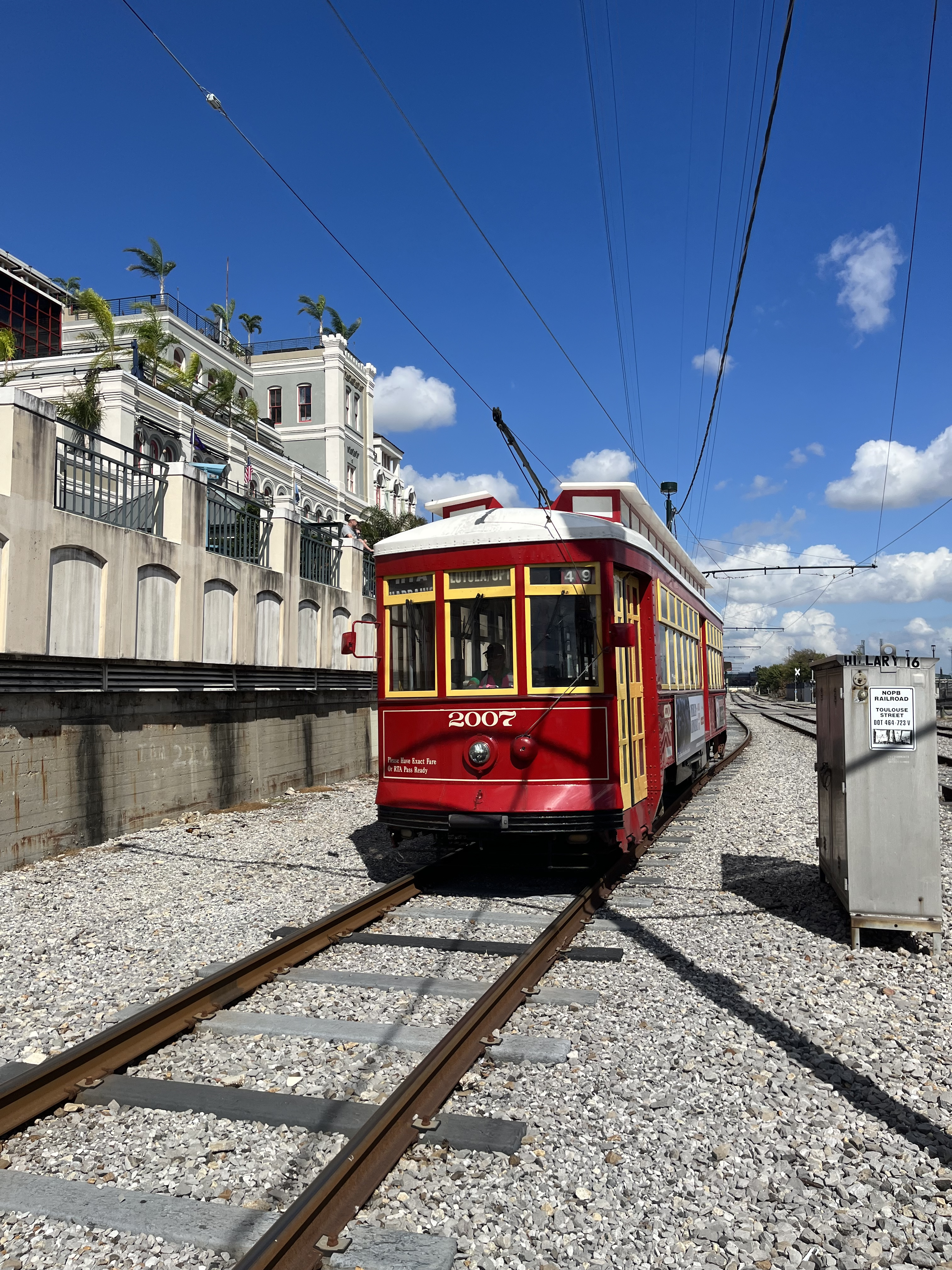
- Streetcar on the Riverfront section of the line

Overview
- Status: Discontinued
- Owner: New Orleans Regional Transit Authority
- Line number: 49
- Locale: New Orleans, Louisiana
- Termini: Union Passenger Terminal (UPT); French Market
- Stations: 19

Service
- Type: Heritage streetcar
- System: Streetcars in New Orleans
- Depot: A. Philip Randolph Operations Facility
- Rolling stock: 2000 Series Perley Thomas replica streetcars

History
- Opened: 2021
- Closed: May 31, 2025; 15 months ago

Technical
- Line length: 2.4 mi (3.9 km)
- Number of tracks: 2
- Character: Exclusive right-of-way (Riverfront Line), neutral ground (Canal Street), and inside traffic lanes (Loyola Avenue)
- Track gauge: 5 ft 2 1/2 in (1,588 mm)
- Electrification: Overhead line, 600 V DC

The Loyola–Riverfront Streetcar Line was a historic streetcar line in New Orleans, Louisiana. It was operated by the New Orleans Regional Transit Authority. Utilizing trackage from the Rampart–Loyola Streetcar Line, Canal Streetcar Line, and Riverfront Streetcar Line, it ran for a total length of 2.4 miles (3.9 km). The line was officially designated Route 49 and was denoted with a light blue color on most RTA publications.

== History ==
A similar service pattern was implemented upon the opening of the Loyola-UPT Streetcar Line in 2013; however, the line would only terminate at French Market on the weekends and would normally terminate at the foot of Canal Street.

This service pattern was abandoned in 2016 as the Loyola-UPT line was extended to become the Rampart-St. Claude Streetcar Line.

This service pattern was revived in 2021 when NORTA, as a result of the Hard Rock Hotel collapse and the construction of the Four Seasons Hotel and Private Residences New Orleans, combined the Loyola-UPT portion of the Rampart-St. Claude Streetcar Line and part of the Riverfront Streetcar Line to create the UPT-Riverfront Line. It inherited the former route number of the Rampart-St. Claude Streetcar Line. However, unlike the service pattern in 2013, it terminated at French Market at all times. Following the reopening of the Rampart Streetcar Line, it was renamed the Loyola–Riverfront Streetcar Line, numbered 49, while the Rampart-St. Claude Streetcar Line was renamed to the Rampart-Loyola Streetcar Line—renumbered 46.

On December 16, 2024, the line was shut down due to needed maintenance work on one of the substations. This work was needed after the suspects stole copper wiring from the substation. The line resumed service on January 6, 2025.

The line was discontinued on May 30, 2025, with Rampart/UPT and Riverfront lines returning to service next day. The Riverfront line inherited the line's route number of 49.

== Route description ==
The Loyola–Riverfront Streetcar Line begins at the French Market Stop near the intersection of Peters Street and Esplanade Avenue, with access to the French Market and the New Orleans Mint in the French Quarter. This portion of the line operates on a separated right of way as it utilizes the Riverfront Streetcar Line. It then turns right onto Canal Street, running in the neutral ground (the median strip). The route continues on Canal Street until it turns left onto Loyola Avenue, running on the inside traffic lanes, where it continues until terminating at the New Orleans Union Passenger Terminal.

== Stop listing ==
From French Market to UPT

| Stop | Neighborhood(s) | Other streetcar lines | Notes |
|---|---|---|---|
By way of the Riverfront Line
| French Market | French Quarter | | Near the intersection of Peters Street and Esplanade Avenue. Serves French Market and New Orleans Mint. |
| Ursulines Street | French Quarter | | Serves French Market. |
| Dumaine Street | French Quarter | | Serves Jackson Square, Preservation Hall, St. Louis Cathedral and Woldenberg Park. |
| Toulouse Street | French Quarter | | Serves Jax Brewery and Woldenberg Park. |
| Bienville Street | French Quarter | | Serves Woldenberg Park. |
| Canal Street | Downtown, Central Business District, French Quarter | 47 48 | Connects with Canal Street Ferry Terminal. Serves Audubon Aquarium of the Americas, Harrah's Casino, Woldenberg Park, and World Trade Center. |
By way of Canal Street
| Canal St. Ferry Terminal | Downtown, Central Business District | 47 48 | Serves Audubon Aquarium of the Americas, Harrah's Casino, Woldenberg Park, World Trade Center |
| Peters Street | Downtown, Central Business District, French Quarter | 47 48 | Serves Audubon Insectarium, Harrah's Casino and The Shops at Canal Place |
| Magazine/Decatur Streets | Downtown, Central Business District, French Quarter | 47 48 | |
| Camp/Chartres Streets | Downtown, Central Business District, French Quarter | 47 48 | |
| St. Charles Avenue/Royal Street | Downtown, Central Business District, French Quarter | 47 48 | |
| Carondelet/Bourbon Streets | Downtown, Central Business District, French Quarter | 12 47 48 | Transfer point to St. Charles Streetcar Line |
| Baronne/Dauphine Streets | Downtown, Central Business District, French Quarter | 47 48 | |
| Rampart Street | Downtown, Central Business District, French Quarter | 46 47 48 | Transfer point to Rampart–Loyola Streetcar Line and many RTA buses |
By way of Loyola Avenue
| Tulane Avenue | Downtown, Central Business District, Biomedical District | 46 | Serves LSU Health Sciences Center New Orleans, New Orleans Public Library, and Tulane Hospital; Loyola Avenue transitions from Elk Place |
| Poydras Street | Downtown, Central Business District | 46 | Serves Champions Square, City Hall, Civil District Court, Duncan Plaza, Caesars Superdome, and Smoothie King Center |
| Hyatt Regency New Orleans Hotel | Downtown, Central Business Street | 46 | Serves Hyatt Regency New Orleans Hotel; Stop located near Girod Street in the Bloch Cancer Survivors Plaza; Linked by walkway leading from South Rampart and Lafayette Streets |
| Julia Street | Downtown, Central Business District | 46 | |
| Union Passenger Terminal (UPT) | Downtown, Central Business District | 46 | Connects with Amtrak and Greyhound Lines |
