= Canal Streetcar Line =

Historic streetcar line in New Orleans, Louisiana

47 48 Canal
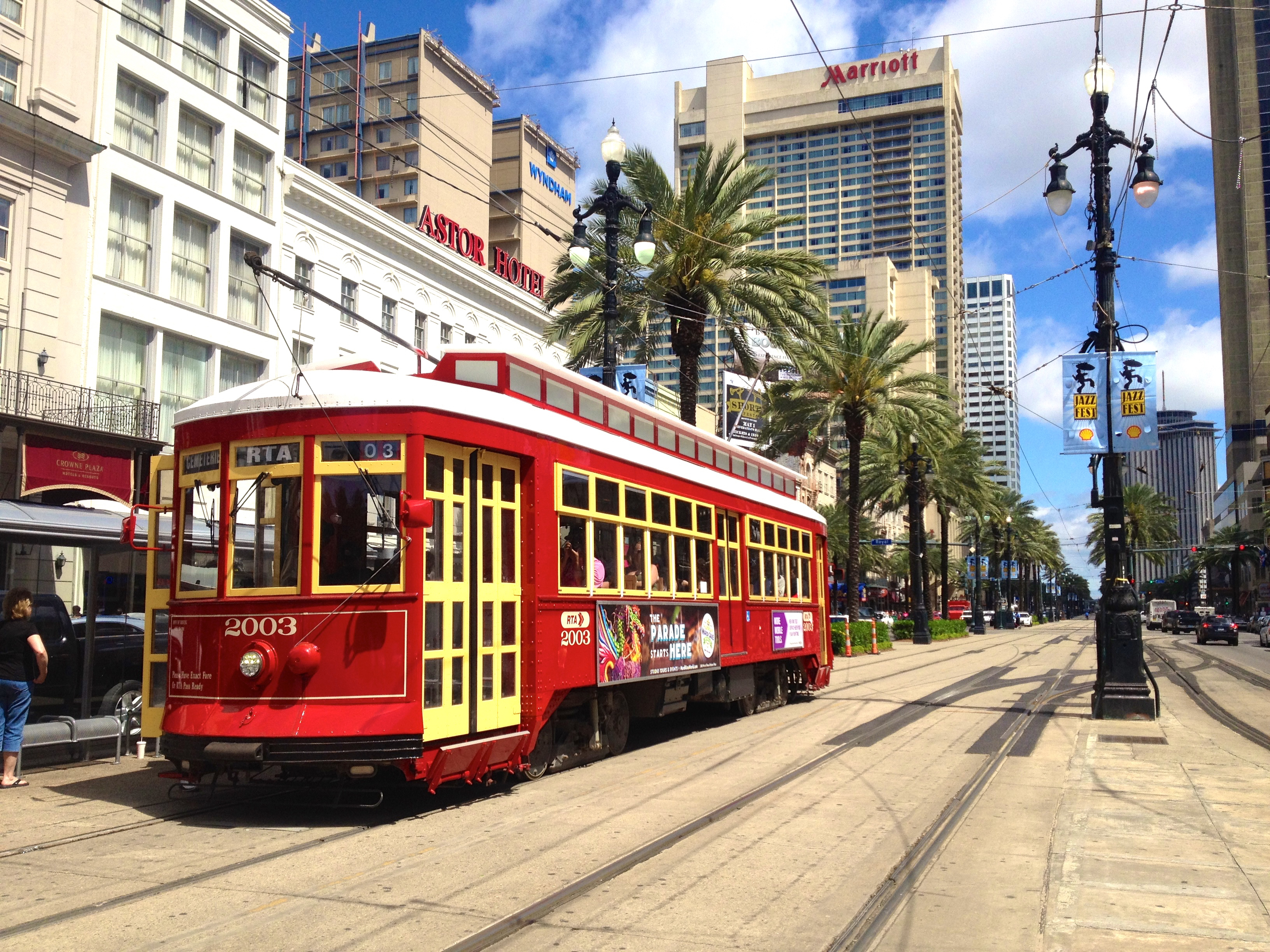
- A 2000 series streetcar operating on Canal Street at Bourbon Street

Overview
- Owner: New Orleans Regional Transit Authority
- Line number: 47, 48
- Locale: New Orleans, Louisiana
- Termini: Cemeteries or City Park; Canal St. Ferry Terminal
- Stations: 34

Service
- Type: Heritage streetcar
- System: Streetcars in New Orleans
- Depot: A. Philip Randolph Operations Facility
- Rolling stock: 2000 series

History
- Opened: 1861 (first incarnation); April 18, 2004; 22 years ago (current incarnation)
- Closed: 1964 (first incarnation)

Technical
- Line length: 5.5 mi (8.9 km) (total)
- Number of tracks: 2
- Character: Runs in neutral ground (median strip) along Canal St, in mixed traffic on Carrollton Ave
- Track gauge: 5 ft 2 1/2 in (1,588 mm)
- Electrification: Overhead line, 600 V DC

The Canal Streetcar Line is a streetcar line in New Orleans, Louisiana, operated by the New Orleans Regional Transit Authority (RTA). The line originally operated from 1861 until its closure in 1964. After a 40-year hiatus, it was rebuilt between 2000 and 2004, with streetcar service resuming on April 18, 2004.

The modern line primarily follows Canal Street and comprises two branches named after their outer terminals, totaling approximately 5.5 miles (8.9 km) in length. The Canal/Cemeteries branch (designated Route 47) runs the full length of Canal Street, from the foot of the Mississippi River—where it connects with the Riverfront Streetcar Line and the Canal Street Ferry—to the Cemeteries Transit Center at the intersection of Canal Street and City Park Avenue, which offers connections to multiple RTA bus routes. The Canal/City Park branch (designated Route 48) follows the same alignment until North Carrollton Avenue, where it diverges to a terminal near the New Orleans Museum of Art in City Park, at the intersection of Carrollton and Esplanade avenues. As of 2024, the two branches are depicted in RTA publications using yellow and red colors, respectively.

From 1964 to 2004, after the original streetcar service ended, the Canal Street corridor was served by multiple RTA bus lines, many of which operated in the neutral ground (median strip) through the Central Business District, where the streetcar tracks were later reinstalled.

== Route description ==
The trunk of the Canal Streetcar line travels a direct route along Canal Street from where it begins at Convention Center Boulevard (in front of Harrah's Casino) to Carrollton Avenue where the two branches split. Tracks continue toward the River to the tracks utilized by the Riverfront line. Leaving the central business district, the line mostly traverses several neighborhoods in the Mid-City portion of the city and consists of 3 miles (4.8 km) inland.

=== Branches ===
The "Cemeteries" branch continues on Canal Street past Carrollton Avenue to its terminus at Metairie Road (which continues as City Park Avenue), surrounded by several cemeteries. For much of its history, this area constituted the northern (lakeside) boundary of the city, which explains the density of cemeteries, Catholic, Protestant, and Jewish, in this area. Beginning July 31, 2017, and completed on December 4, a new loop terminal was built north of City Park Avenue on Canal Boulevard, providing passengers with better access to transfer between the streetcars and connecting bus lines. Following a month of testing and training, the new loop went into service January 7, 2018.

The "City Park/Museum" branch (or sometimes just "City Park") turns northward from Canal onto North Carrollton Avenue, where it runs in the inside lanes of the street rather than in the neutral ground. It is reduced to a single track at the intersection of City Park/Moss Avenues and returns to the neutral ground before it ends at Beauregard Circle, at Esplanade Avenue and Bayou St. John, near the entrance of the New Orleans Museum of Art in City Park. It is within easy walking distance of the New Orleans Fairgrounds, site of the yearly Jazz and Heritage Festival.

On October 12, 2019, a building under construction at the corner of Canal Street and N. Rampart Street collapsed (see Hard Rock Hotel Collapse). For a time, in order to provide service along Loyola Avenue, Canal-Cemeteries streetcars operated along that avenue instead of going down Canal Street from Loyola Avenue (Elk Place) to the river. Also, Canal-City Park/Museum cars turned back at LaSalle Street, because they could not proceed past the blockage at Rampart Street. Service between Elk Place and the river was provided by diesel buses.

The Canal Cemeteries and City Park branches were originally designated as Routes 42 and 45, respectively, until January 2009, when the route numbers were changed to 47 and 48. The colors for the Canal Cemeteries and City Park branches were originally designated as red and light green respectively, until May 2024, when the colors were changed to light yellow and red.

== History ==
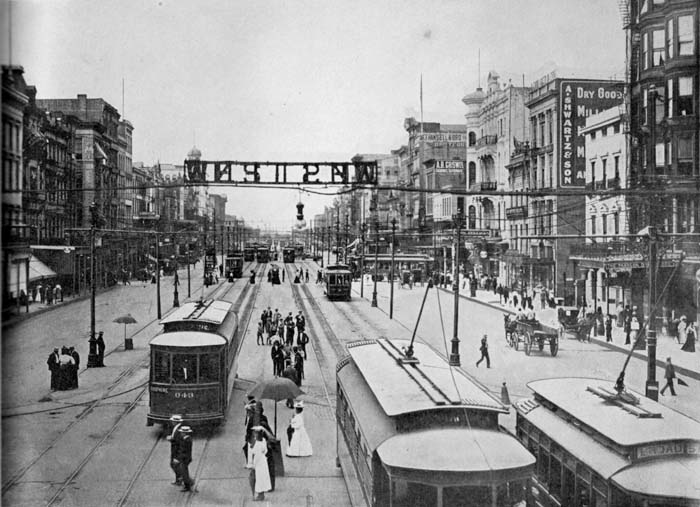
Streetcars on Canal Street in the central business district, c. 1904–1908

The Canal Street Line traces its origins to the old New Orleans City RR Co., founded to provide horse-drawn streetcar service throughout the city. This system's first lines opened in June 1861, running on Esplanade, Magazine, Prytania, and Canal Streets. The original car barn for the Canal Line, which served it until the end in 1964, was established at White Street. The line ran on its namesake street from St. Charles Street to the car barn; it was extended in August all the way to the end of the street at the Cemeteries.

The City RR came under the control of the New Orleans Traction Co. in 1892 as the system was prepared for electrification. A large order for new electric streetcars was placed with the Brill Co. of Philadelphia. The Canal Line was the first New Orleans Traction line to be electrified, beginning electric service on July 28, 1894. It was followed very quickly by Esplanade and the rest of the company's horsecar lines. The line was extended slightly in the central business district to terminate at the foot of Canal Street, not far from the Mississippi River.

In 1901, the streetcar company slightly extended the Canal and Esplanade Lines so that their outer ends met at City Park Ave., and connected them together in a Belt Line. Canal cars left the central business district on Canal Street, operated to City Park Ave., turned down that street to Esplanade Ave., and returned on Esplanade to Rampart and thus back to Canal Street. Cars marked Esplanade left the central business district via Rampart Street down to Esplanade, then operated out Esplanade to City Park Ave. to Canal, and returned on Canal Street. This Belt Line arrangement lasted until December 27, 1934, when Esplanade Ave. was converted to buses, and Canal resumed running only on Canal Street, end-to-end.

From 1934 to 1950, there were two lines running on Canal Street. Cars marked West End operated from the foot of Canal to the outer end of the street at the cemeteries, then turned left onto City Park Avenue (Metairie Road) to the New Basin Canal, and then out the east bank of that canal to the West End amusement area at Lake Pontchartrain. Cars marked Cemeteries followed the same route, but turned back at the cemeteries immediately after turning off of Metairie Road. West End made only limited stops along Canal Street from Claiborne Ave. to City Park Ave. The West End line was converted to buses in 1950, after which the surviving Cemeteries cars were once again signed Canal. In 1951, the outer terminus of the Canal Line was moved to the end of Canal Street, and tracks on City Park Ave. (Metairie Road) were removed.

In 1964, the streetcar company (known since 1922 as New Orleans Public Service Incorporated, or NOPSI) proposed to convert the Canal line to buses. The line was to be combined with the West End and Canal Boulevard bus lines, so that patrons could have a one-seat ride all the way from the central business district to Lake Pontchartrain. There was tremendous controversy over the proposal from the protests of preservationists. While the St. Charles Streetcar line was spared, the Canal line was not. The last day was May 30, 1964, with the final run (NOPSI car 972, carrying banners which read "See Me On St. Charles") leaving Canal Line tracks at about 5:00 a.m. on May 31. All the streetcars, except for 35 reserved for the St. Charles Line, were scrapped or donated to museums across the country, and all track and overhead wire were removed.

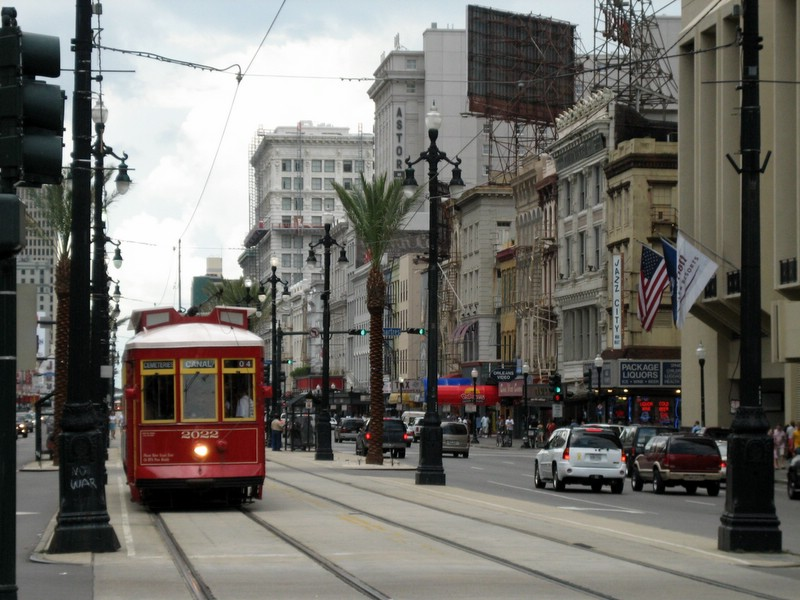
Canal Street Line streetcar, 2005.

By the 1990s, interest in streetcars was rekindled, not only in New Orleans, but in many cities around the country. Plans for the restoration of the Canal Line were announced in 2000, and tracks were rebuilt from the foot of Canal Street out to the cemeteries. A branch line was created on North Carrollton Avenue, which had never before had streetcar service. Finally, the Canal streetcar line reopened April 18, 2004, almost 40 years after its close. It replaced multiple stop service on Canal in the Mid-City mostly except for a limited stop express line which ran all the way to the lake, which was eliminated suddenly due to Hurricane Katrina.

In 2005, Hurricane Katrina damaged the red streetcars of the Canal and Riverfront lines which were stored at the car barn behind the RTA headquarters. As streetcar service was restored, it was forced to utilize the green cars borrowed from the St. Charles line while the red cars were rebuilt.

In 2017, construction began on the Cemeteries Transit Terminal. This moved the terminus of cemeteries branch from City Park Ave to Canal Blvd. Furthermore, the new terminus featured double balloon loops for turning streetcars around along with a covered walkway to transfer to buses. This greatly improved safety as pedestrians no longer had to navigate a three way intersection. The Cemeteries Transit Terminal officially opened on January 5, 2018 with streetcar and bus service beginning January 7, 2018.

== Operation ==
Streetcars operate approximately every 11 minutes for most of the day along the shared Canal Street segment. Service on individual branches alternates, resulting in headways of approximately 22 minutes on each branch. The Canal/City Park branch operates between approximately 5:00 a.m. and midnight daily. The Canal/Cemeteries branch operates 24 hours a day, with reduced overnight service between midnight and 5:00 a.m., when cars run approximately every 40 minutes; between approximately 3:00 a.m. and 5:00 a.m., trips operate only between the Canal Street Ferry Terminal and Carrollton Avenue.

== List of streetcar stops ==
From Central Business District to Mid-City

Stop	Neighborhood(s)	Other streetcar lines	Notes
47 48 Canal Streetcar trunk line by way of Canal Street
Canal St. Ferry Terminal	Central Business District	49	Transfer point to Canal Street Ferry; Inbound stop is at Convention Center Blvd; the outbound stop is half a block west Serves Audubon Aquarium, Caesars New Orleans, and Woldenberg Park
Peters St	Central Business District, French Quarter		Serves Audubon Insectarium, Caesars New Orleans, and The Shops at Canal Place
Camp St / Chartres St	Central Business District, French Quarter		
Carondelet St / Bourbon St	Central Business District, French Quarter	12	
Rampart St	Central Business District, French Quarter	46	Transfer point to many RTA buses
LaSalle St / Marais St	Biomedical District		
Claiborne Ave	Biomedical District, Tulane/Gravier		
Prieur St	Tulane/Gravier		Serves University Medical Center New Orleans
Galvez St	Tulane/Gravier		Serves New Orleans VA Medical Center
Tonti St	Tulane/Gravier		
Dorgenois St	Tulane/Gravier		
Broad St	Mid-City, Tulane/Gravier		
White St	Mid-City		Late-night inbound terminus of City Park branch. Serves RTA headquarters and tracks diverge to the A. Philip Randolph yard.
Salcedo St	Mid-City		
Lopez St	Mid-City		
Norman C. Francis Pkwy	Mid-City		
Clark St	Mid-City		
Telemachus St	Mid-City		
Scott St	Mid-City		
Carrollton Ave	Mid-City		Last outbound stop on both branches before tracks diverge
47 Canal/Cemeteries branch line by way of Canal Street
Hennessey St	Mid-City		
Murat St	Mid-City		
St. Patrick St	Mid-City		
St. Anthony St	Mid-City		
Cemeteries Transit Terminal	Mid-City		Transfer point to many RTA buses. Stop on Canal Bl at City Park Av
48 Canal/City Park branch line by way of North Carrollton Avenue
Bienville Ave	Mid-City		
St. Louis St	Mid-City		
Orleans Ave	City Park		
Dumaine St	City Park		
Museum of Art	City Park		Serves New Orleans City Park and Museum of Art; Stop at North Carrollton Av and Esplanade Av
