= 2013 in rail transport in the United States =

The following are events related to rail transportation in the United States that happened in 2013.

== January ==
- (Louisiana) 28 January – New Orleans Regional Transit Authority Loyola Avenue Streetcar Line opened.

== April ==
- 14 April – Utah Transit Authority's TRAX light rail Green Line extends service west from downtown Salt Lake City to the Salt Lake City International Airport.
- (Colorado) 26 April – RTD's W-Line light rail corridor extends service west from Denver Union Station to Golden. This is the first FasTracks corridor to be completed.

== May ==
- (United States) 10 May – Norfolk Southern announces the appointment of James A. Squires to become the railroad's new president effective 1 June.
- 27 May – CapeFLYER summer weekend service from Boston, Massachusetts to Cape Cod begun.

== August ==
- 18 August – Utah Transit Authority's TRAX light rail Blue Line extends service further south from Sandy to Draper.

== December ==
- 8 December – Utah Transit Authority's S Line (formerly known as Sugar House Streetcar) opens with service from South Salt Lake to the Sugar House neighborhood of Salt Lake City.
- (Texas) 21 December – The Houston METRORail Red Line is extended from the UH–Downtown station to Northline Transit Center/HCC with 8 new stops.
