= Rampart–Loyola Streetcar Line =

Historic streetcar line in New Orleans, Louisiana

46 Rampart–Loyola
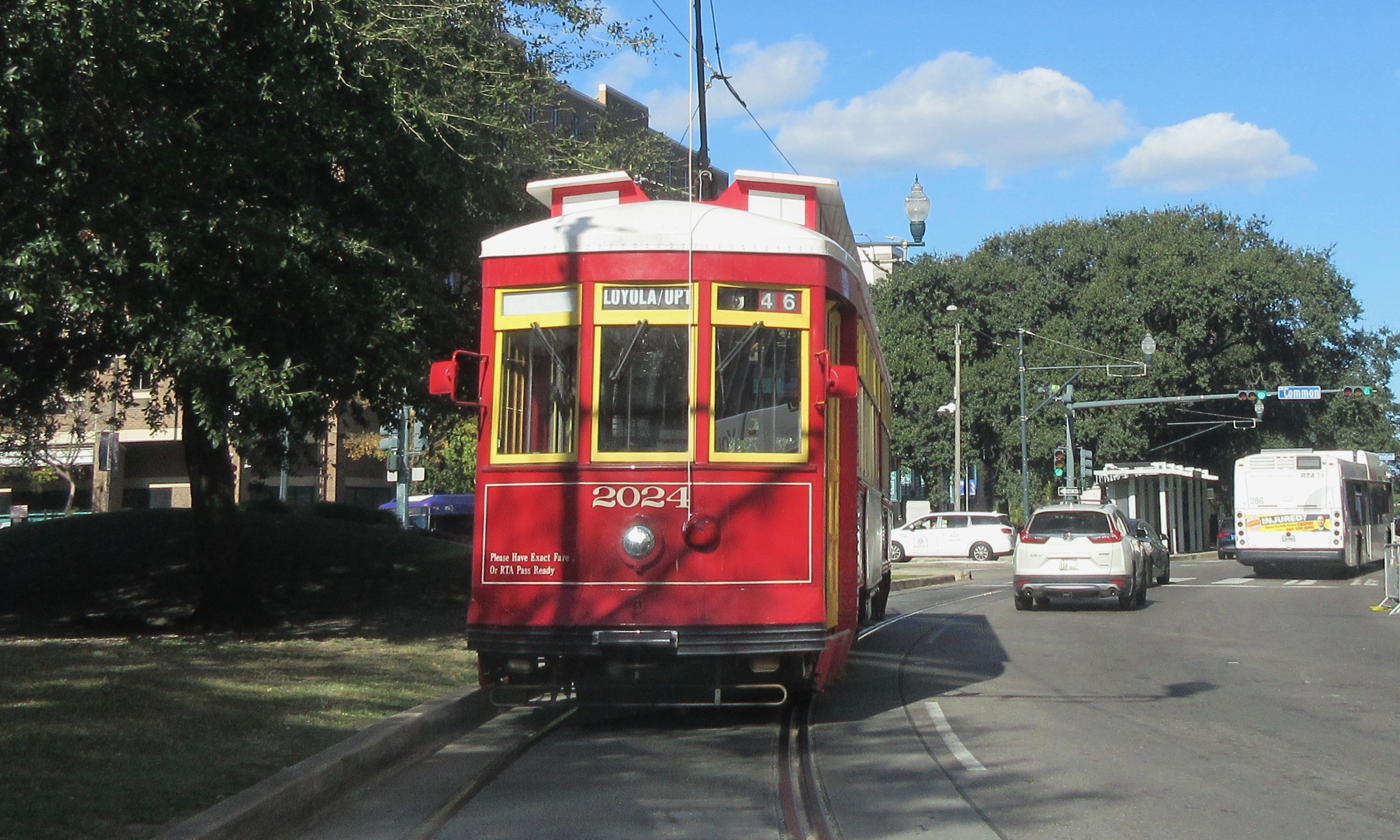
- 2000 series streetcar operating on Loyola Av near Tulane Av

Overview
- Owner: New Orleans Regional Transit Authority
- Line number: 46
- Locale: New Orleans, Louisiana
- Termini: New Orleans Union Passenger Terminal; Elysian Fields
- Stations: 11

Service
- Type: Heritage streetcar
- System: Streetcars in New Orleans
- Depot: A. Philip Randolph Operations Facility
- Rolling stock: 2000 series

History
- Opened: January 28, 2013; 13 years ago
- Extended: October 2, 2016
- Closed: October 19, 2019–May 19, 2024; November 20, 2024–June 1, 2025

Technical
- Line length: 2.2 mi (3.5 km)
- Number of tracks: 2
- Character: Runs in traffic lanes next to the neutral ground
- Track gauge: 5 ft 2 1/2 in (1,588 mm)
- Electrification: Overhead line, 600 V DC

The Rampart–Loyola Streetcar Line is a historic streetcar line in New Orleans, Louisiana. It is operated by the New Orleans Regional Transit Authority (RTA). It is the newest streetcar line in the system, as it opened in its original form on January 28, 2013, with the total length of the line being 2.4 miles (3.9 km). The line is officially designated Route 46 and is denoted with a purple color on most RTA publications.

== History ==
The line was originally called the Loyola–UPT Streetcar Line, and was designated Route 49. It opened on January 28, 2013. Construction started in August 2011, and the line was opened in time for New Orleans' hosting of Super Bowl XLVII. It was extended on October 2, 2016 to become the Rampart–St. Claude Streetcar Line as part of the Rampart Streetcar construction project that began in April 2015.

On October 12, 2019, a building under construction at the corner of Canal Street and N. Rampart Street collapsed, blocking the line. The portion of the line between Canal and Elysian Fields could not be served by rail. For a time, the Loyola-UPT portion of the line, along Loyola Avenue, was served by Canal-Cemeteries streetcars 24 hours a day. Later, it was combined with the Riverfront line as the 49 UPT-Riverfront line, operating from UPT via Loyola to Canal, then in on Canal to Riverfront, then along the Riverfront line to its French Quarter terminal.

=== Reconstruction ===
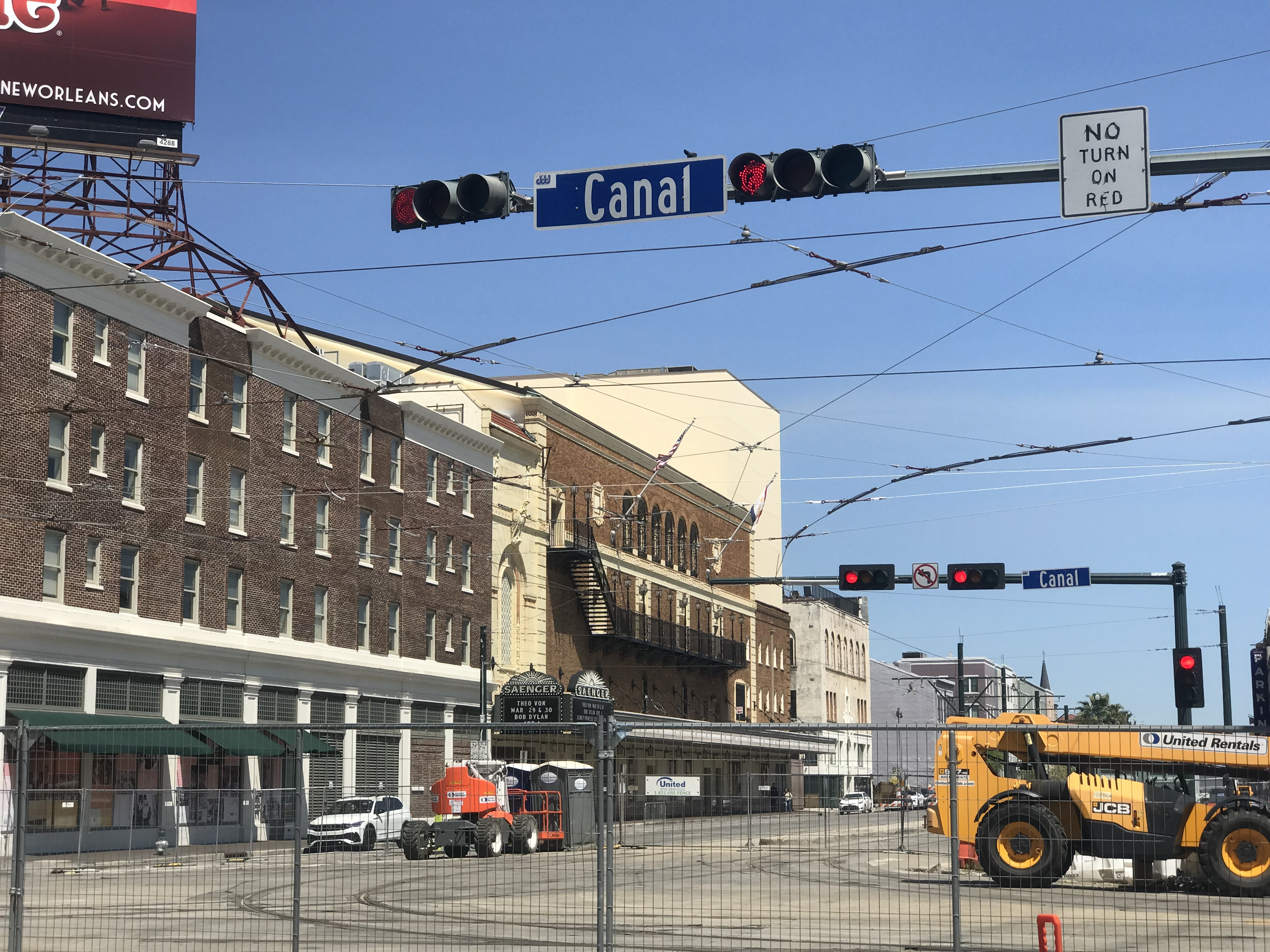
Crews work to repair the damage that was done during the Hard Rock Hotel collapse. Taken March 29, 2024.

Several dates for reconstruction were posted but barely any work was seriously done until after the 2024 Mardi Gras season. NORTA announced construction would end March 31, 2024 and, following 6 weeks of training and testing, it would reopen on May 31, 2024. Due to the construction, the Canal line had to terminate ahead of Rampart but Canal line service to Harrah's Casino had been restored by April 13, 2024 as construction had concluded by then. NORTA then conducted a pull test of the new line. On May 1, NORTA began testing streetcars and testing operators on the line.

=== Reopening ===
Much to the surprise and delight of many, the line opened on May 19, 2024. This coincided with a rename to the 46 Rampart–Loyola Streetcar Line and a recoloring to purple. The combined 49 UPT–Riverfront Streetcar Line, now recolored to a light blue and renamed to the Loyola–Riverfront Streetcar Line, continued operating in tandem with it.

=== Closure ===
In November 2024, a construction crew caused damage to the traffic signal wiring on the intersection of Canal Street and N. Rampart Street. This effectively shut down the line as streetcars could no longer safely turn onto N. Rampart Street. NORTA indicated the line would re-open in June as part of the Summer 2025 service schedules. The closure is now blamed on City of New Orleans Construction.

=== Second Reopening ===
On June 1, 2025, the line reopened for the second time since the Hard Rock Collapse.

== Route description ==
The Rampart–Loyola Streetcar Line begins at the New Orleans Union Passenger Terminal (UPT) where it connects with RTA bus routes, Amtrak, and Greyhound Lines. From there, it runs for 0.8 mi (1.3 km) on Loyola Avenue in the New Orleans Central Business District to Canal Street. With the exception of only two blocks, this portion of the line does not operate on neutral ground, but rather on the inside traffic lanes. It is also unique in New Orleans in that the streetcar stops are built to light rail system standards as opposed to typical streetcar stops that utilize a simple concrete platform sometimes with a bench and/or a canopy. The route continues on Canal Street for one block before turning onto North Rampart Street, primarily with trackage operating in mixed street traffic. It continues through the French Quarter and Tremé neighborhoods, then continues onto St. Claude Avenue to its terminus at Elysian Fields Avenue. The line operates the same type of Von Dullen cars as the Canal Street line. It features solar powered passenger shelters along Loyola Avenue.

The original Loyola–UPT line went down Canal to Harrah's at the Mississippi River, and on weekends, it continued further down the Riverfront tracks to the French Market terminal at Esplanade Avenue.

== Operation ==
As of January 2026, the Rampart/Loyola Streetcar Line operates daily from 6 a.m. to midnight, with streetcars running every 30 minutes.

== Stop listing ==
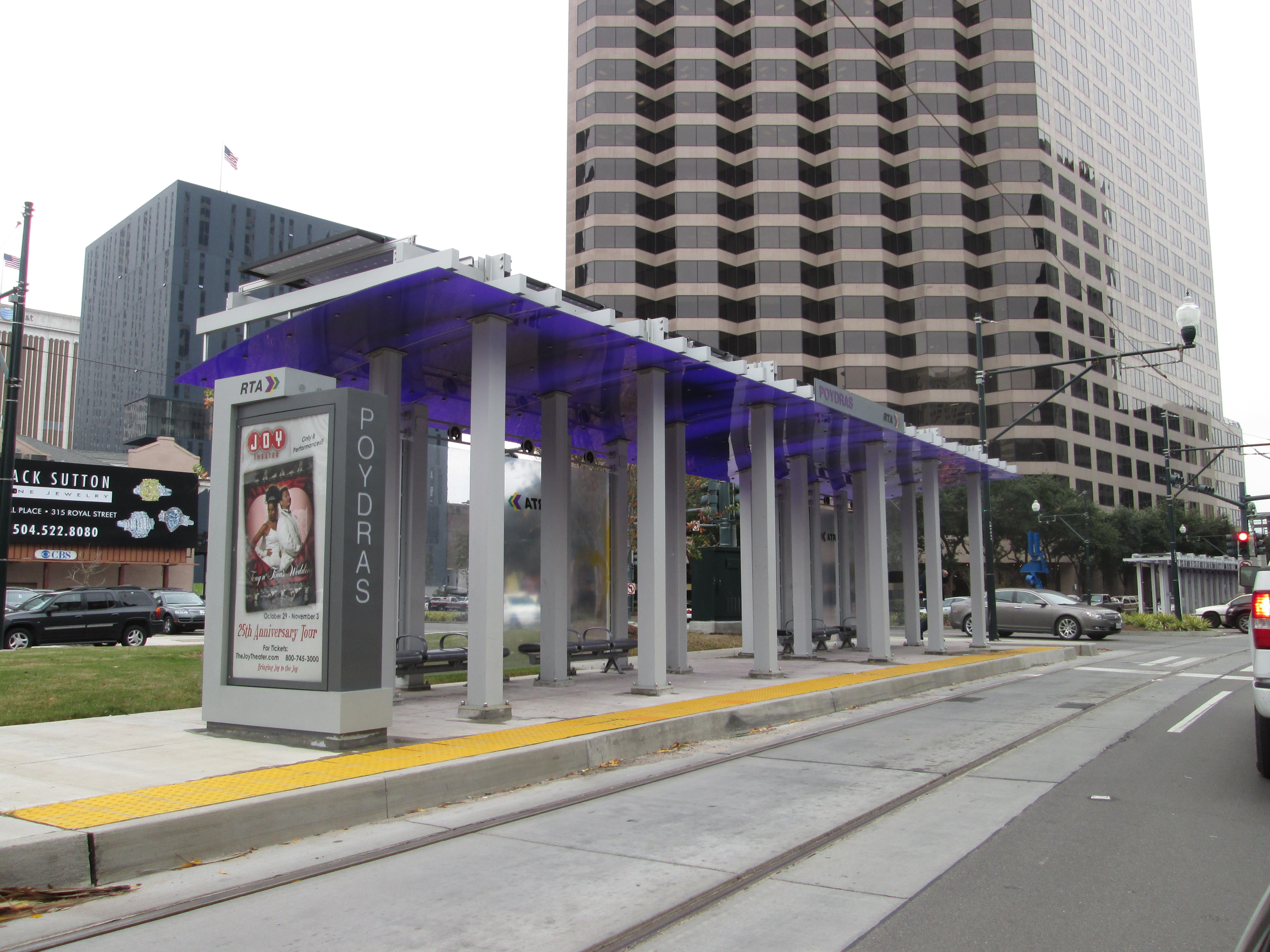
A typical stop on the Loyola Avenue section

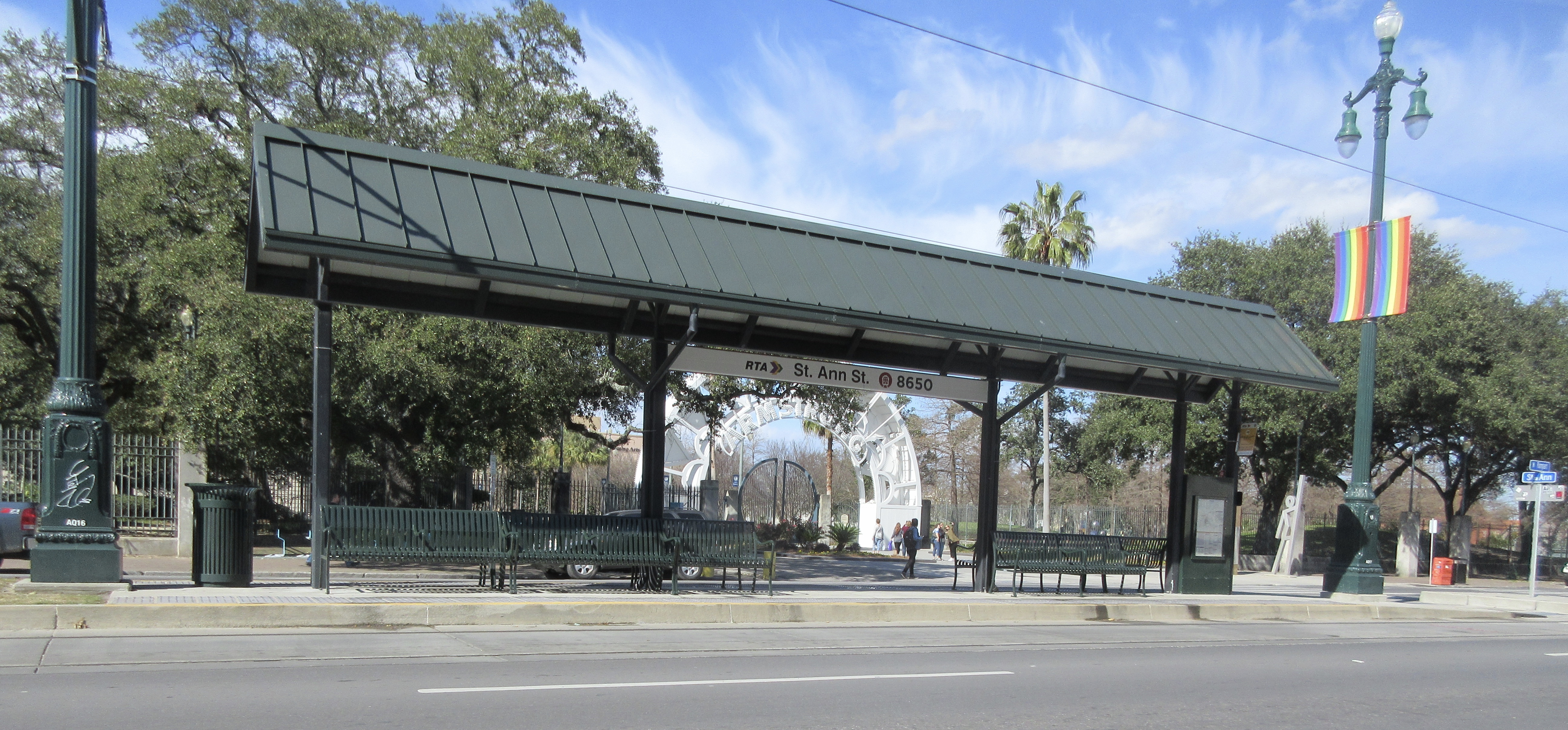
A typical stop on the North Rampart Street section

From Marigny to UPT

Stop	Neighborhood(s)	Other streetcar lines	Notes
By way of St. Claude Avenue
Elysian Fields Ave	Marigny, Seventh Ward		Serves Frenchmen Entertainment District
Pauger St	Marigny, Seventh Ward		
By way of McShane Place (two blocks), then North Rampart Street
Esplanade Av	French Quarter, Marigny, Seventh Ward, Tremé		
Ursulines St	French Quarter, Tremé		
St. Ann St	French Quarter, Tremé		Serves Louis Armstrong Park (including Congo Square, Mahalia Jackson Theater for the Performing Arts, Municipal Auditorium and New Orleans Jazz National Historical Park)
Conti St	French Quarter, Iberville		
Canal St & Rampart St	Central Business District, French Quarter	47 48	Major transfer point to Canal Streetcar Line and many RTA buses Serves Saenger Theatre
By way of Elk Place from Canal to Tulane, then Loyola Avenue to UPT
Tulane Ave	Central Business District, Biomedical District		Serves LSU Health Sciences Center New Orleans, New Orleans Public Library, and Tulane Hospital; Loyola Avenue transitions from Elk Place
Poydras St	Central Business District		Serves Champions Square, City Hall, Civil District Court, Duncan Plaza, Caesars Superdome, and Smoothie King Center
Julia St	Central Business District		
Union Passenger Terminal	Central Business District		Connects with Amtrak and Greyhound

== Proposed expansion ==
Original plans for the French Quarter Rail Expansion called for the line to extend to Press Street, and to have a branch extending from St. Claude via Elysian Fields Avenue to connect with the Riverfront line at the foot of Elysian Fields and Esplanade Avenues, but those extensions have not been funded. Another proposed extension would take streetcars down St. Claude Avenue past Press Street to Poland Avenue, next to the Industrial Canal. This would require crossing the Norfolk Southern Railroad at Press Street, which the railroad opposes on safety grounds. These plans are considered unlikely to be fulfilled.
