= Woldenberg Park (New Orleans) =

Park in New Orleans, Louisiana, US

Coordinates: 29.9533°N 90.0630°W

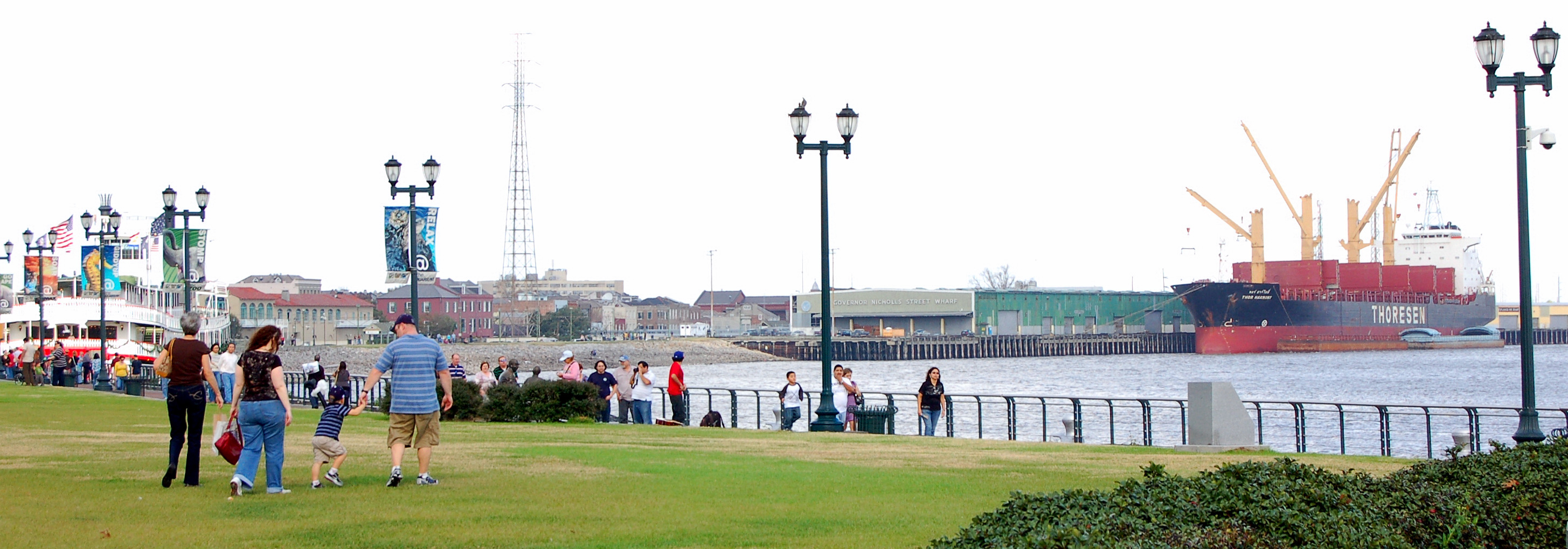
View of the Mississippi River from Woldenberg Park

Woldenberg Park is a park in New Orleans, Louisiana. It was created in the late 1980s on land that had been occupied by old wharves and warehouses along the Mississippi Riverfront, in the upper French Quarter, first opening as a park in October 1989. It is named after philanthropist Malcolm Woldenberg (1896–1982) who helped fund its construction.

The upriver end of the park is at Canal Street and the Aquarium of the Americas. It continues downriver to connect with the riverfront "Moon Walk" across from Jackson Square. Woldenberg Park is occasionally the location of live music performances, especially during the French Quarter Festival.

The park includes several art installations. The New Orleans Holocaust Memorial Sculpture, created by Yaacov Agam, sits near the middle of the park. The sculpture presents several different images from various angles, including a Star of David and a menorah. There is also the Monument to the Immigrant, created by Franco Alessandrini and installed in 1995, and "Ocean Song," a stainless steel sculpture.
