= Audubon Aquarium =

Aquarium in New Orleans, Louisiana, United States

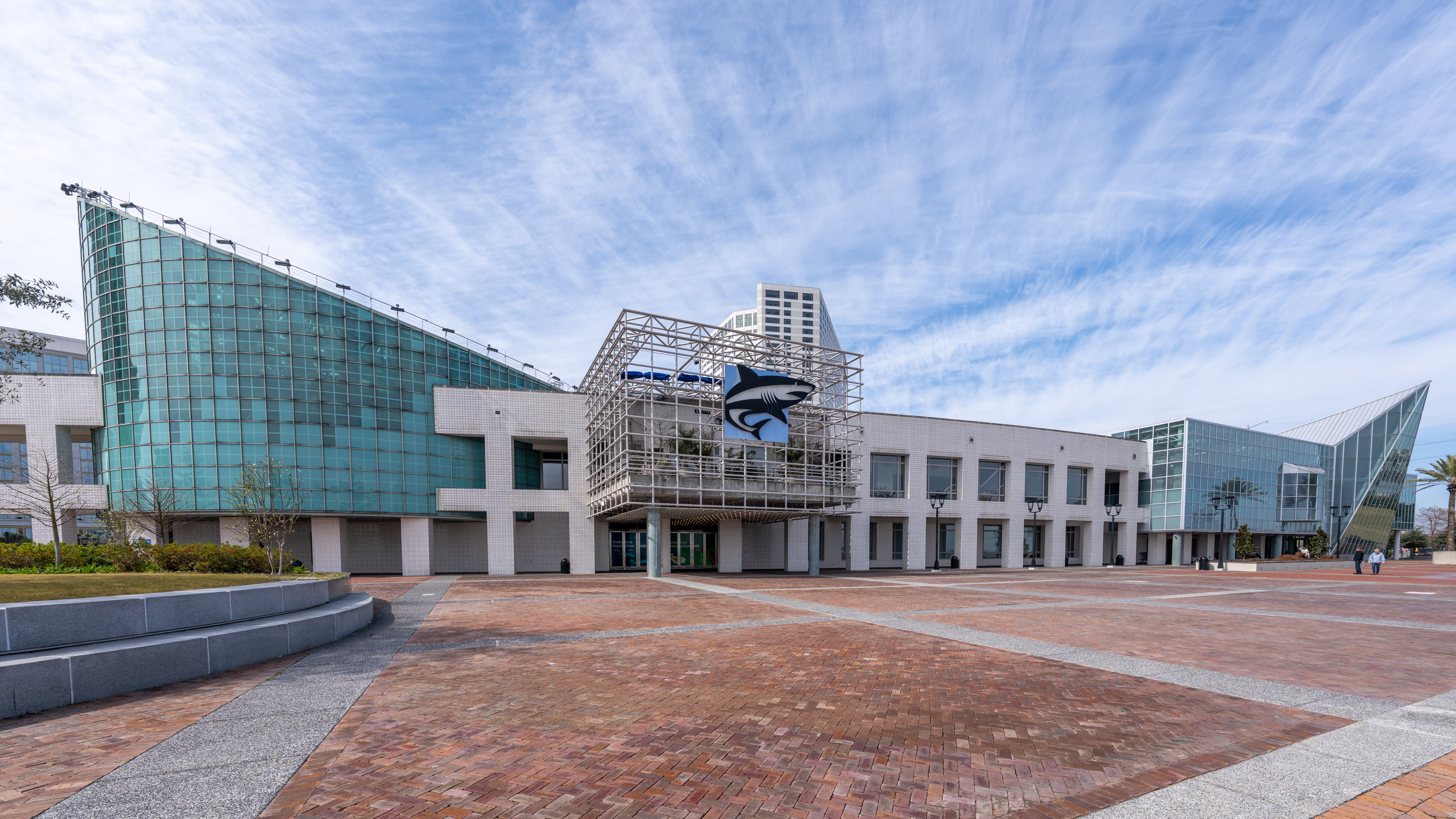
- Audubon Aquarium (2026)
- Interactive map of Audubon Aquarium
- 29°57′1″N 90°3′47″W
- Date opened: September 1, 1990
- Location: New Orleans, Louisiana, United States of America
- No. of animals: 10,000
- No. of species: 530
- Memberships: AZA
- Major exhibits: Amazon Rainforest, Caribbean Reef, Gulf of Mexico, Mississippi River
- Website: audubonnatureinstitute.org/aquarium

Audubon Aquarium is an aquarium in New Orleans, Louisiana, United States. After a $41 million renovation that would see the Audubon Insectarium merge with the facility, the aquarium reopened with new exhibits and experiences on June 8, 2023. The Audubon Nature Institute runs the aquarium, and the institute also supervises the Audubon Zoo, Audubon Louisiana Nature Center, Freeport-McMoRan Audubon Species Survival Center, Audubon Center for Research of Endangered Species (ACRES), Coastal Wildlife Network, Audubon Wilderness Park, and Audubon Park. The aquarium is located along the banks of the Mississippi River by the edge of the historic French Quarter off Canal Street, at the upper end of Woldenberg Park and originally opened on September 1, 1990.

== Exhibits ==
The aquarium specializes in aquatic life of the Americas. The exhibits feature regions throughout North and South America. With 10,000 animals representing 530 species, noteworthy exhibits include:

- Caribbean reef exhibit featuring a clear, 30-foot (9 m) long tunnel surrounded by a 132,000 US gallons (500 m^{3}) tank of exemplary sea life such as the tarpon and angelfish;
- Amazon exhibit, encased in a glass cylinder, effectively a humid, climate-controlled greenhouse that is a prominent feature of the riverfront and includes macaws, piranhas, an anaconda, freshwater stingrays, and other specimens from the area basin;
- Mississippi River gallery, featuring catfish, paddlefish, owls and a leucistic white alligator.
- Gulf of Mexico exhibit, featuring a 400,000 US gallons (1,500 m^{3}), 17-foot (5 m) tall tank of sharks, sea turtles, and stingrays from there.

== History ==
The aquarium originally opened on September 1, 1990.

=== Catwalk collapse ===
On August 7, 2002, a catwalk above the shark tank collapsed during a tour causing 10 visitors to fall into the tank. After 15 minutes, all the visitors were rescued from the tank with minor injuries. 2 visitors were later treated for minor cuts and bruises

=== Katrina damage and aftermath ===
In 2005, the facilities were affected by Hurricane Katrina. Though the structure survived the initial hurricane and was on high ground above the subsequent flooding of most of the city, electricity outages continued and the backup power generators were unable to fully operate the sophisticated life support systems needed to keep the animals alive. Aquarium staffers were forced to evacuate the facility only to return four days later to discover that most of the 10,000 fish did not survive.

The aquarium reopened on May 26, 2006. Since Hurricane Katrina, more species have been in the Caribbean and jellyfish exhibits, and there has been a large revamp to the Gulf of Mexico tank simulating ocean life below an oil rig platform.

== Gallery ==
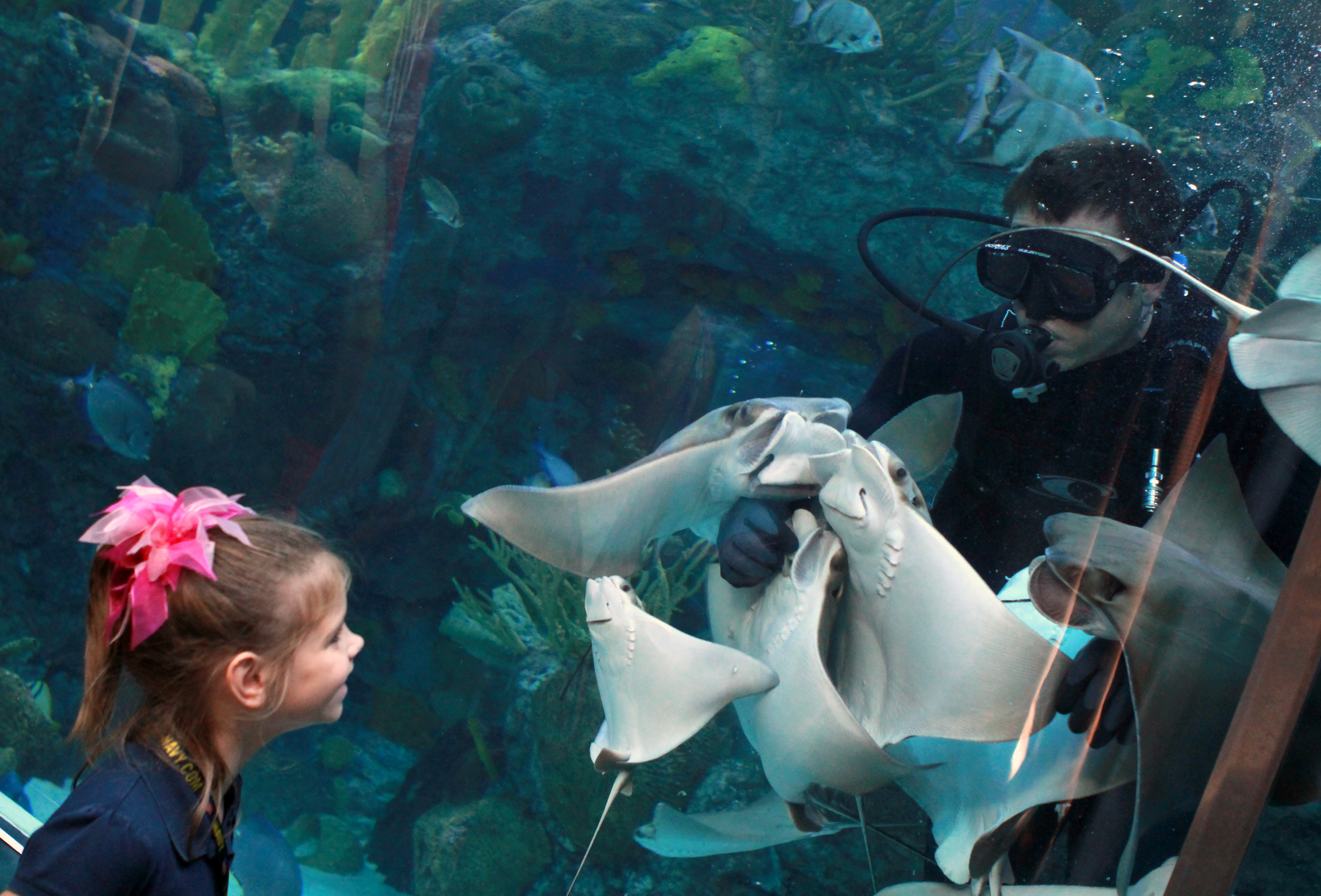
Diver with stingrays.

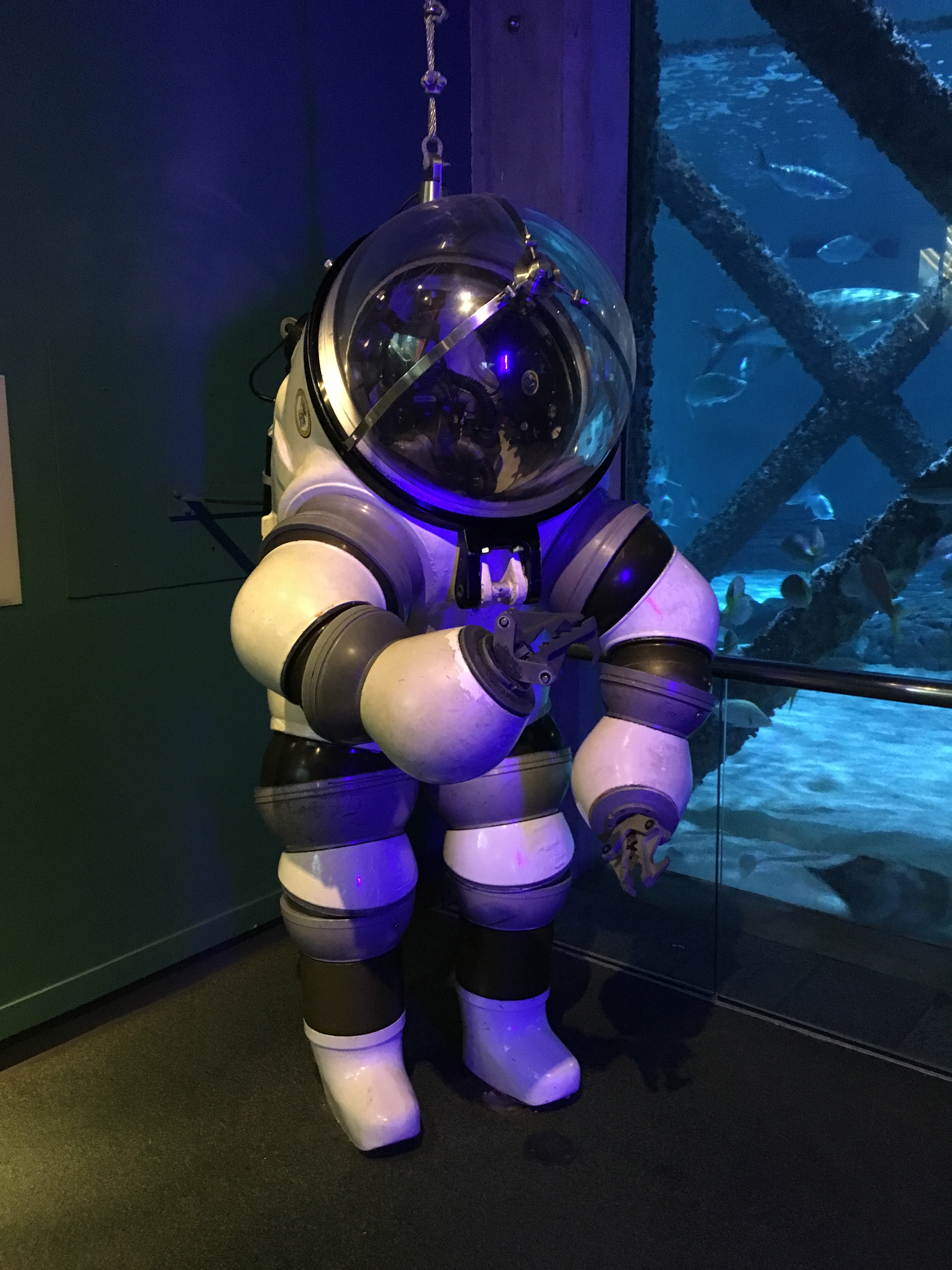
Atmospheric diving suit on display.

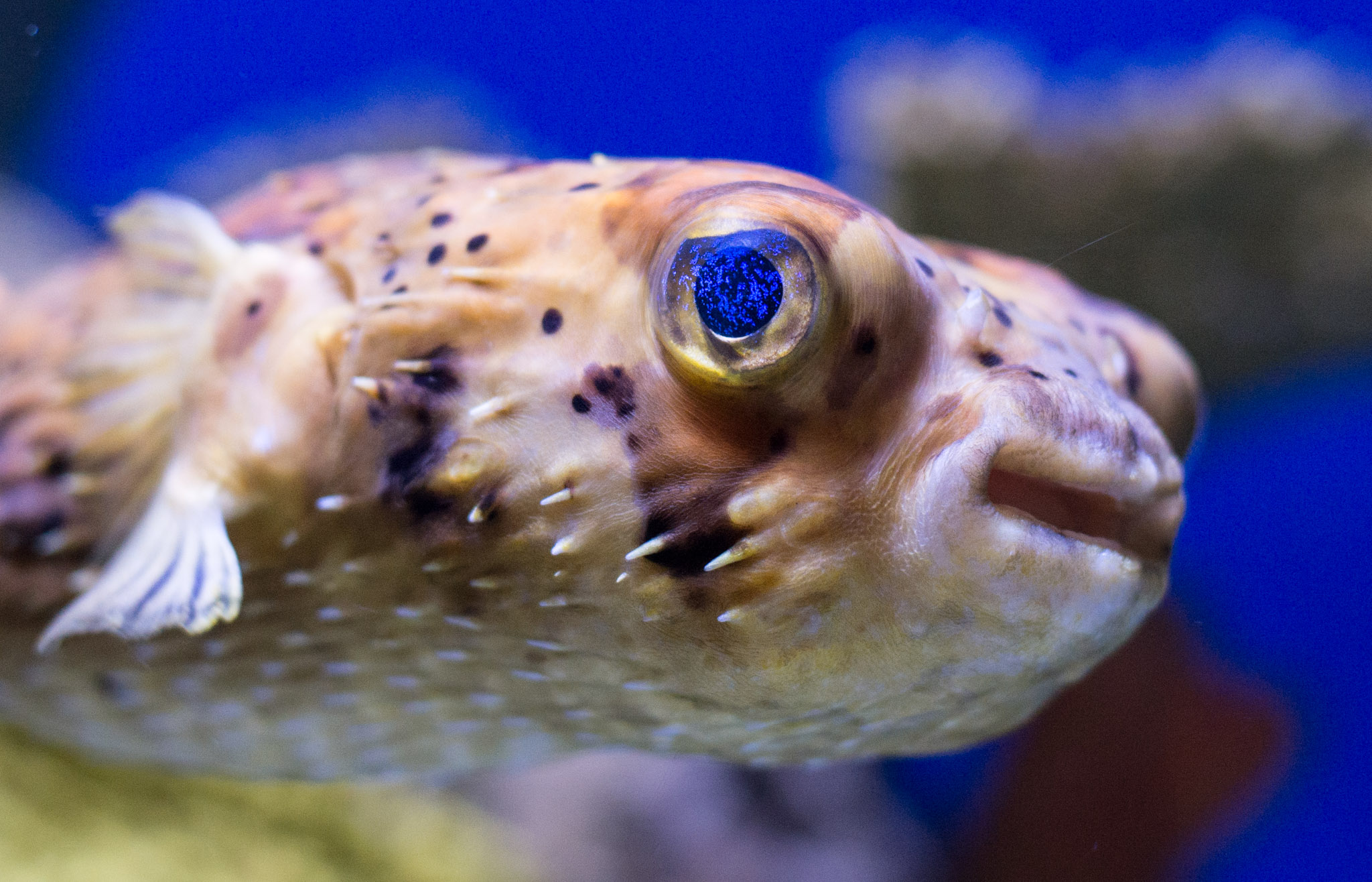
Pufferfish (Tetraodontidae).

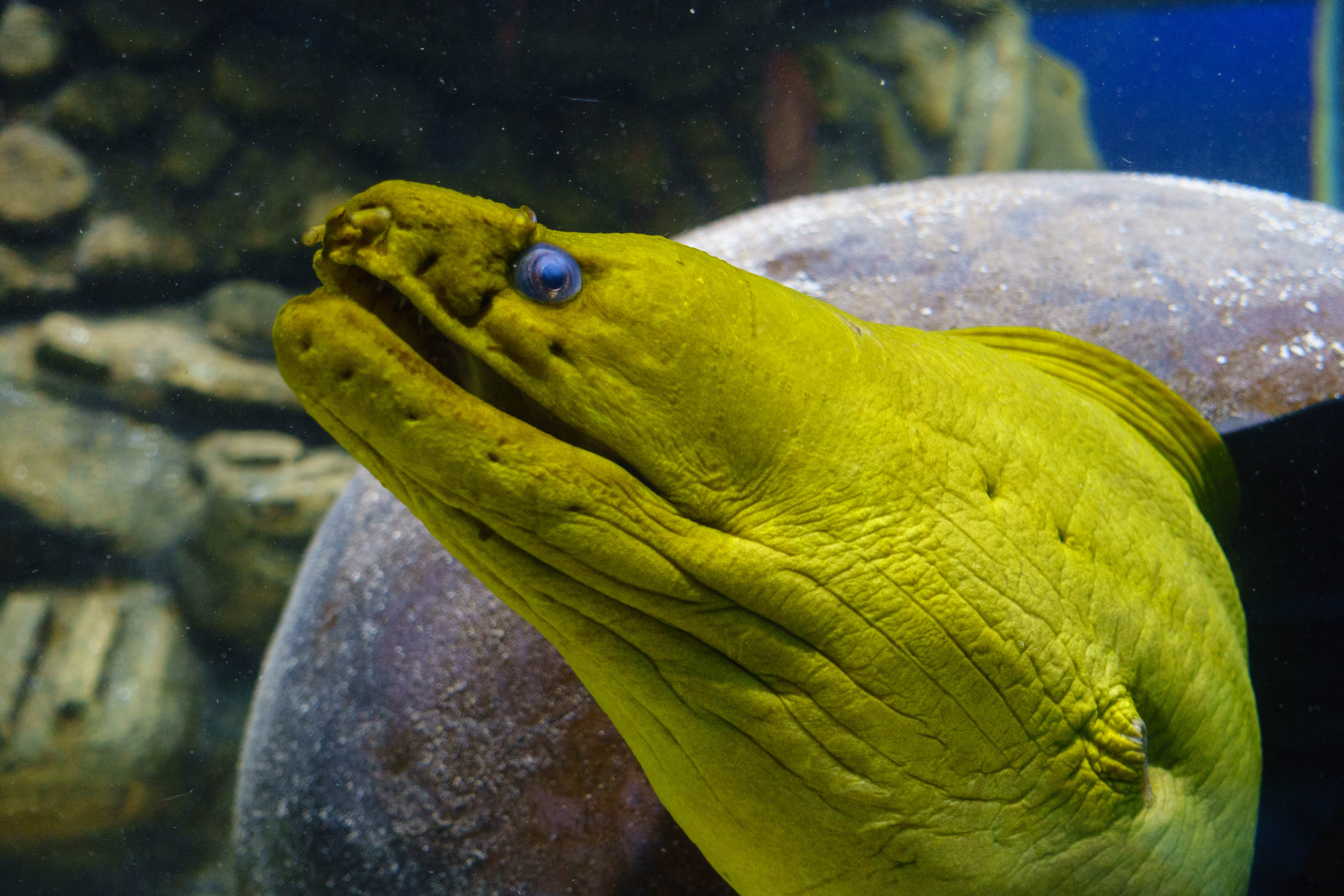
Moray eel (Muraenidae).

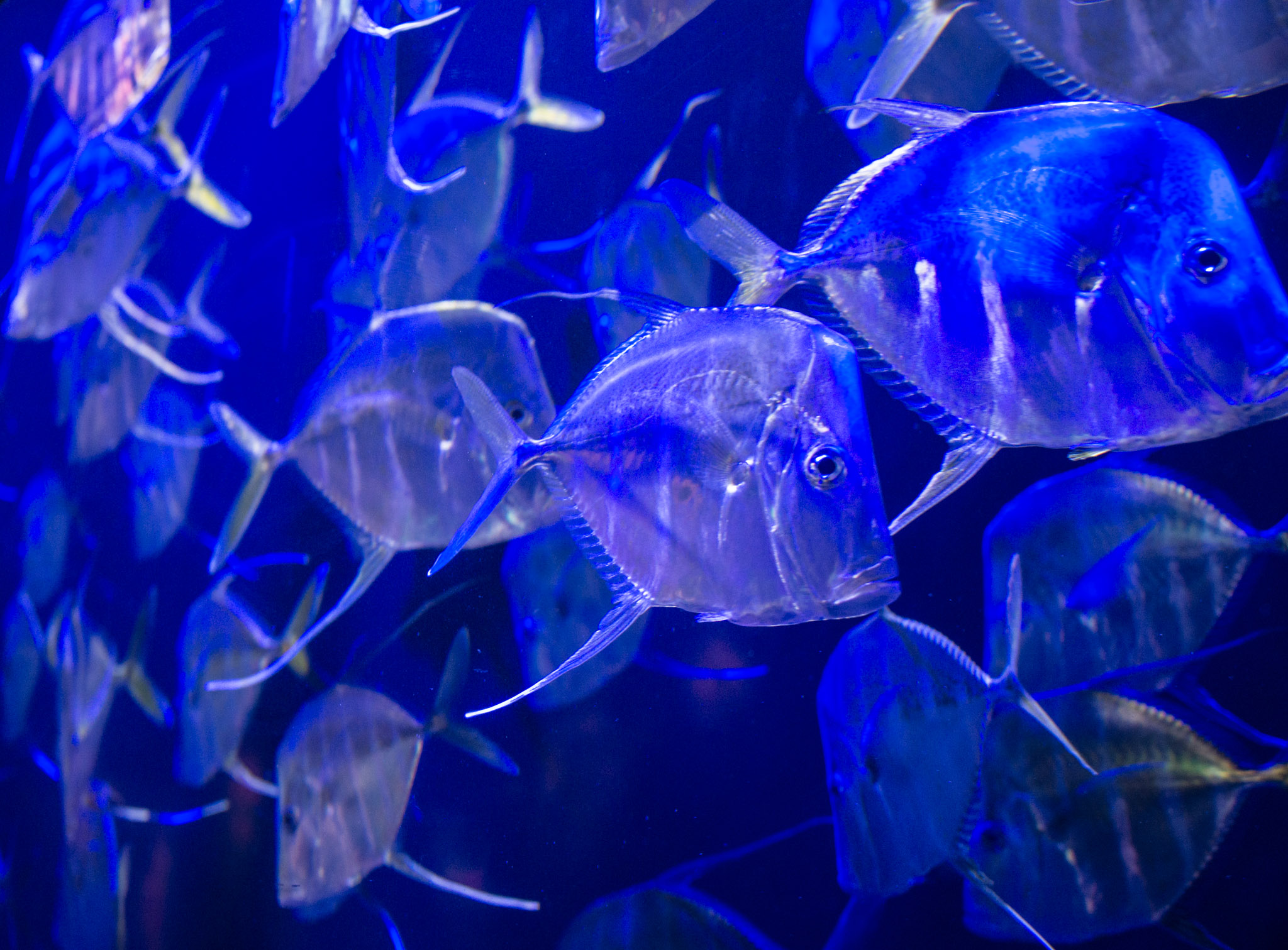
One of the many fish tanks at the aquarium.

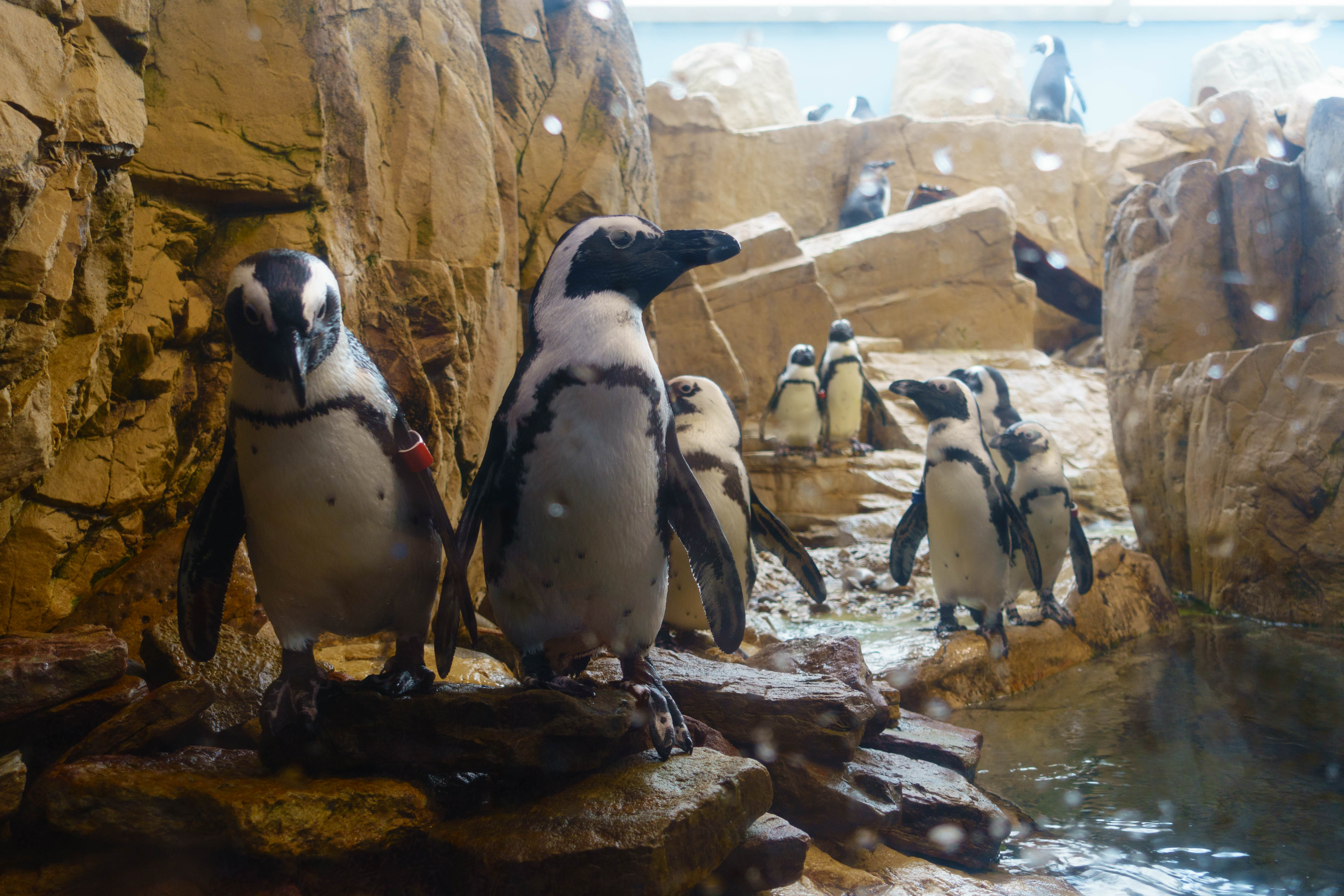
African Penguins exhibit.

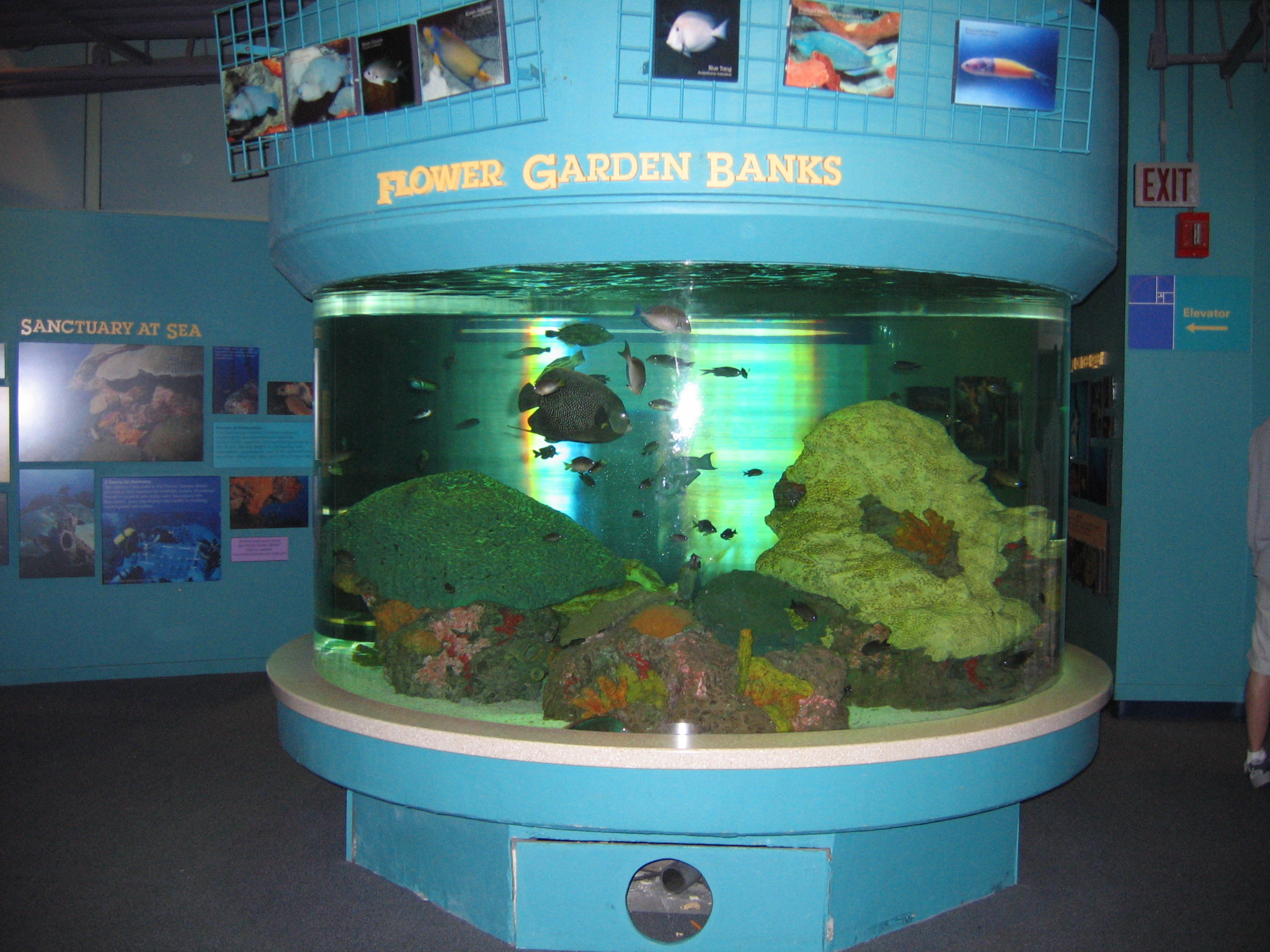
Part of the Caribbean reef exhibit.

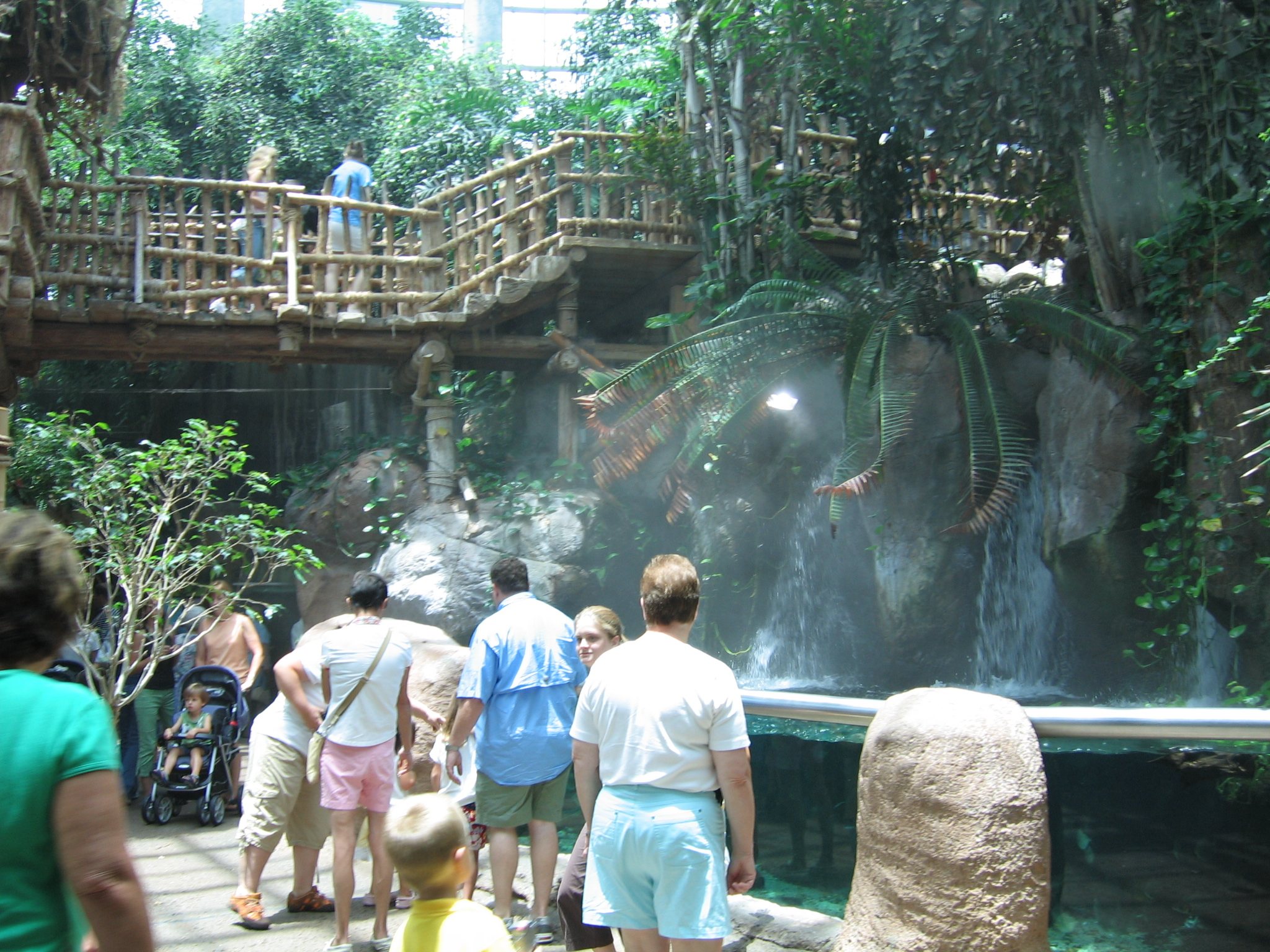
Part of the Amazon-Orinoco rainforest.

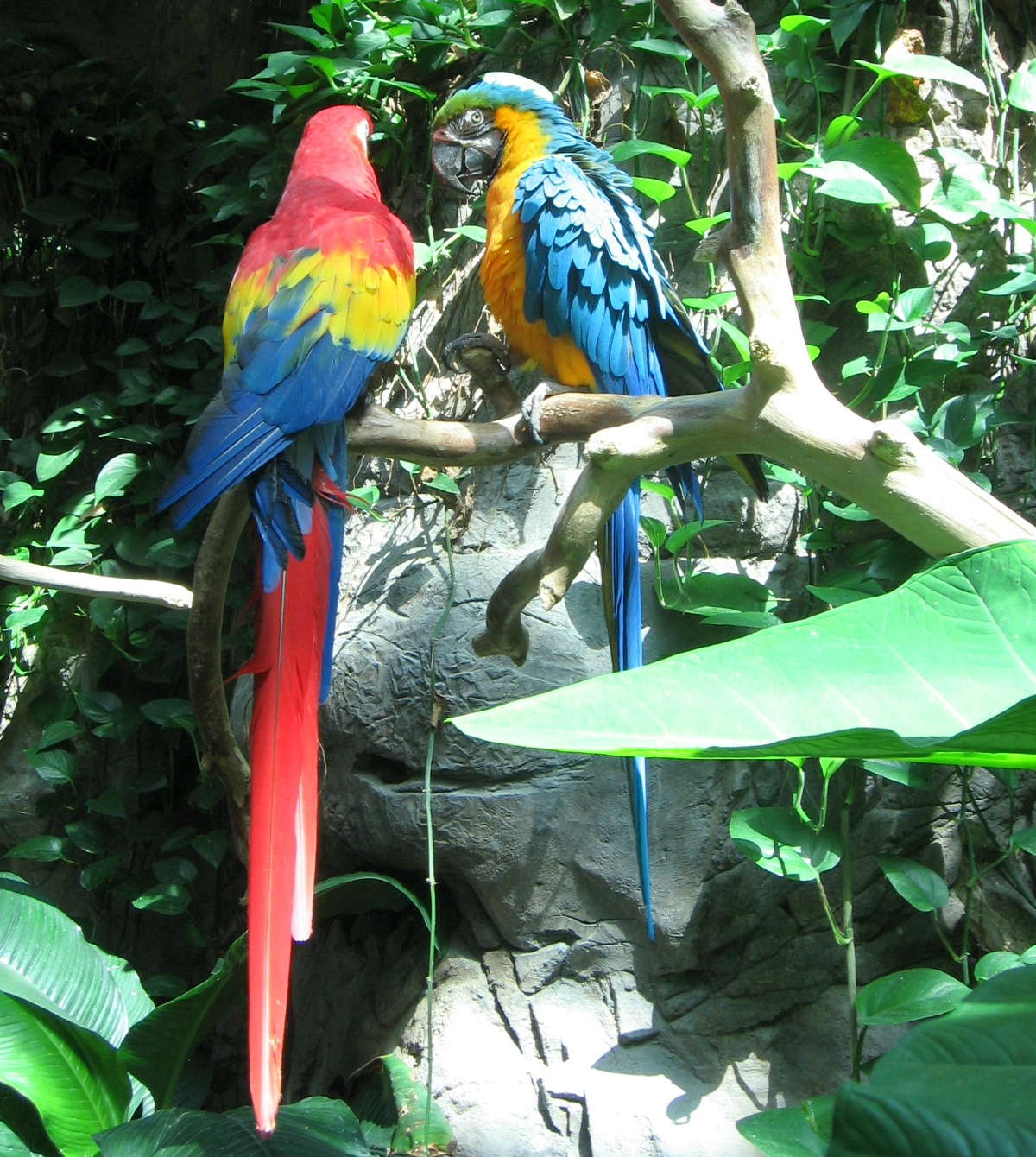
A Scarlet Macaw (left) and a Blue-and-yellow Macaw.

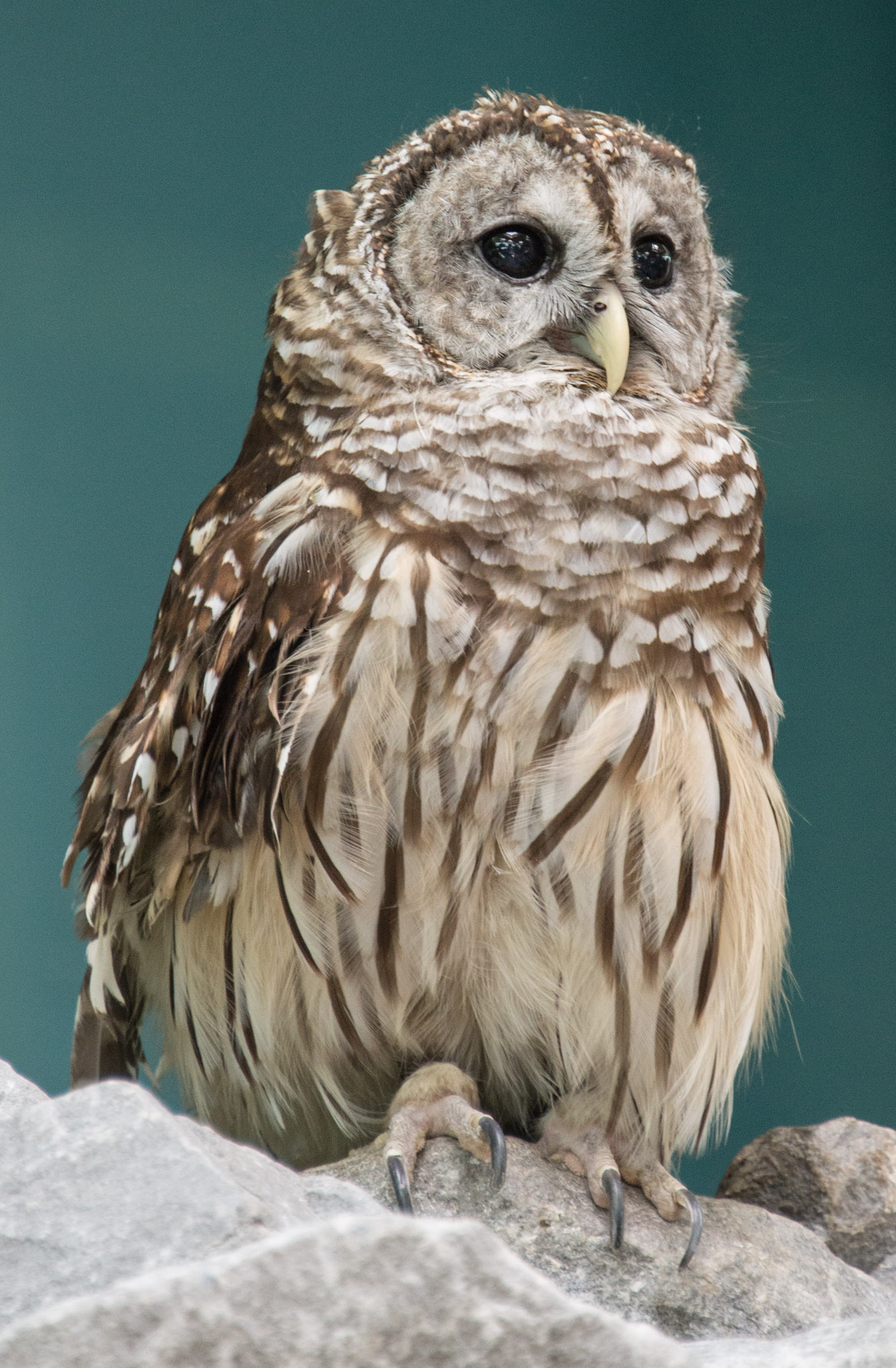
Barred owl (Strix varia).
