= 1031 Canal Street =

Partially collapsed high-rise building in New Orleans

Hard Rock Hotel New Orleans

General information
- Status: Never built
- Type: Mixed-use
- Location: New Orleans, Louisiana, U.S., 1031 Canal Street
- Coordinates: 29.9555°N 90.0723°W
- Construction started: Early 2018
- Construction stopped: October 2019

Height
- Roof: 190 feet (58 m)

Design and construction
- Architect: Harry Baker Smith Architects II
- Developer: Kailas Companies
- Structural engineer: Heaslip Engineering, LLC

1031 Canal Street was the site of a partially collapsed 190-foot-tall (58 m) multi-use high-rise building in New Orleans, Louisiana, located at 1031 Canal Street in the Central Business District. If completed, the project would have been known as the Hard Rock Hotel New Orleans. The site where the hotel would be was formerly home to Woolworth, which closed permanently in the 1990s as the company went out of business.

On October 12, 2019, the under-construction building partially collapsed, resulting in the deaths of three workers and injuring dozens of others. The building was subsequently demolished. As of October 2020 government officials were debating the project's future and the potential culpability of various people and organizations involved.

On April 3, 2020, OSHA found that the structural engineer had "failed to adequately design, review or approve steel bolt connections affecting the structural integrity of the building". The engineer has denied wrongdoing and is appealing the findings. Felony charges against three former building inspectors were recommended by the New Orleans Office of Inspector General, but in 2023, a grand jury decided not to indict anyone on criminal charges stemming from the collapse.

As of September 2025, the site is vacant. On July 14, 2025, New Orleans' Central Business District Historic District Landmarks Commission designated the site as a historic landmark, indicating that a permanent memorial to the workers who died in the collapse could be forthcoming.

== History ==
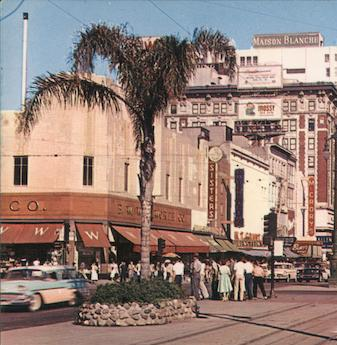
Woolworth store at 1031 Canal (c. 1960)

The location was previously a Woolworth store constructed in the 1930s. The store had been vacant since the 1990s.

After months of controversy, on September 22, 2011, the New Orleans City Council voted 5–2 to approve an application by developer Praveen Kailas to build a high-rise complex on the site. As proposed the building would have included 300 apartment units, a 500-space parking garage and 40,000 square feet (3,700 m^{2}) of retail space on the first two floors. The project had undergone a lengthy and controversial development process.

A permit to demolish the existing building was issued in April 2014, and demolition began in October 2014, with completion scheduled for 2016.

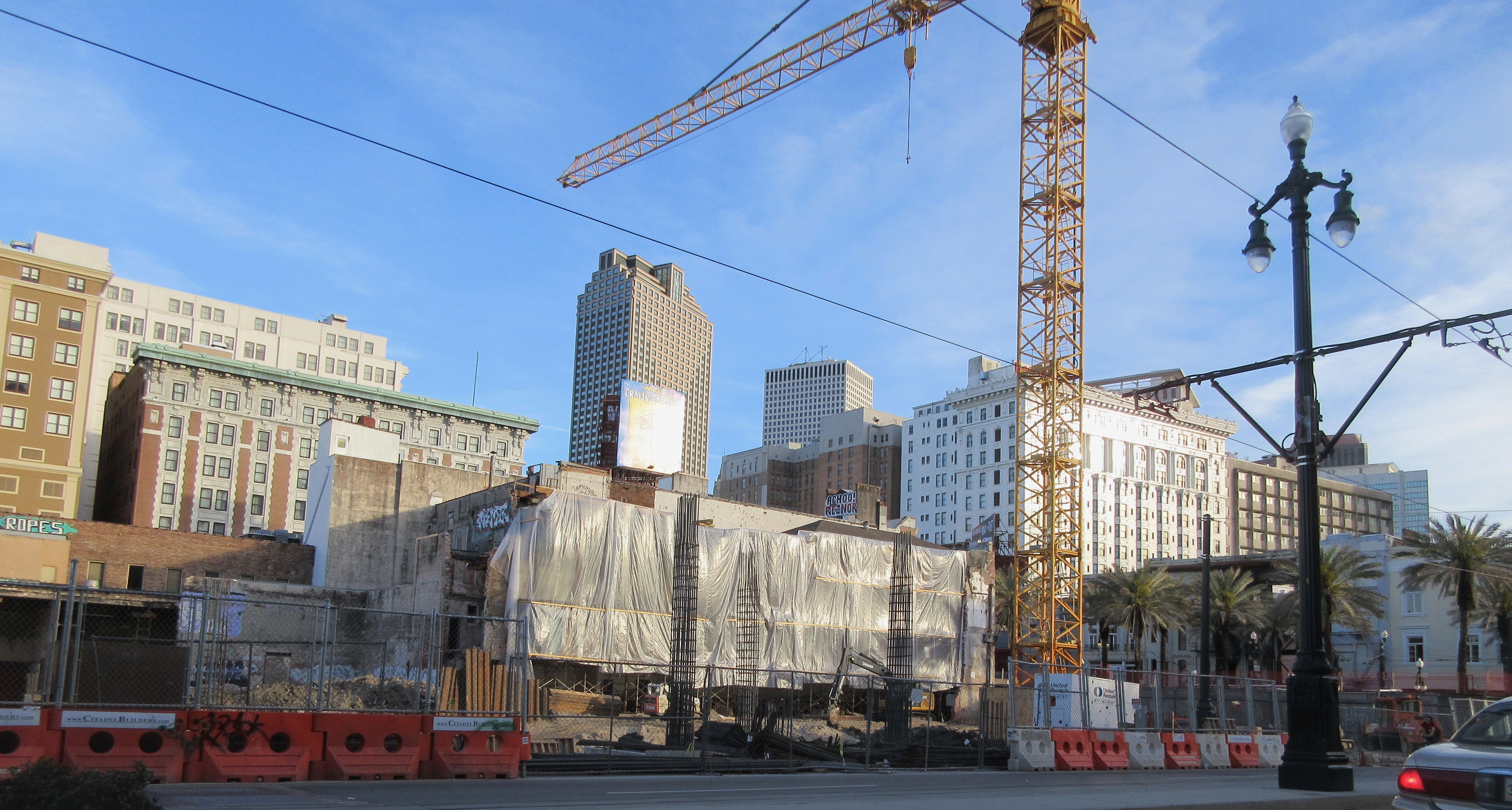
Construction viewed from the Rampart Street side, April 2018

Following the demolition of the Woolworth building, there was little progress made on the site until February 2018, when Kailas announced a partnership with Hard Rock International to turn the new building into the Hard Rock Hotel New Orleans. The new plan maintained the already-approved height, massing, and general design of the tower. Plans for the interior then included 350 hotel rooms, 65 1–3 bedroom units available for purchase, an upscale restaurant, 12,000 square feet (1,100 m^{2}) of event space, and a 400-space parking garage.

== Partial collapse during construction ==
On October 12, 2019, at approximately 9:12 a.m. during construction, the structure partially collapsed on the North Rampart Street side. Three workers died and dozens of others were injured. The workers who died were Jose Ponce Arreola, Anthony Magrette, and Quinnyon Wimberly.

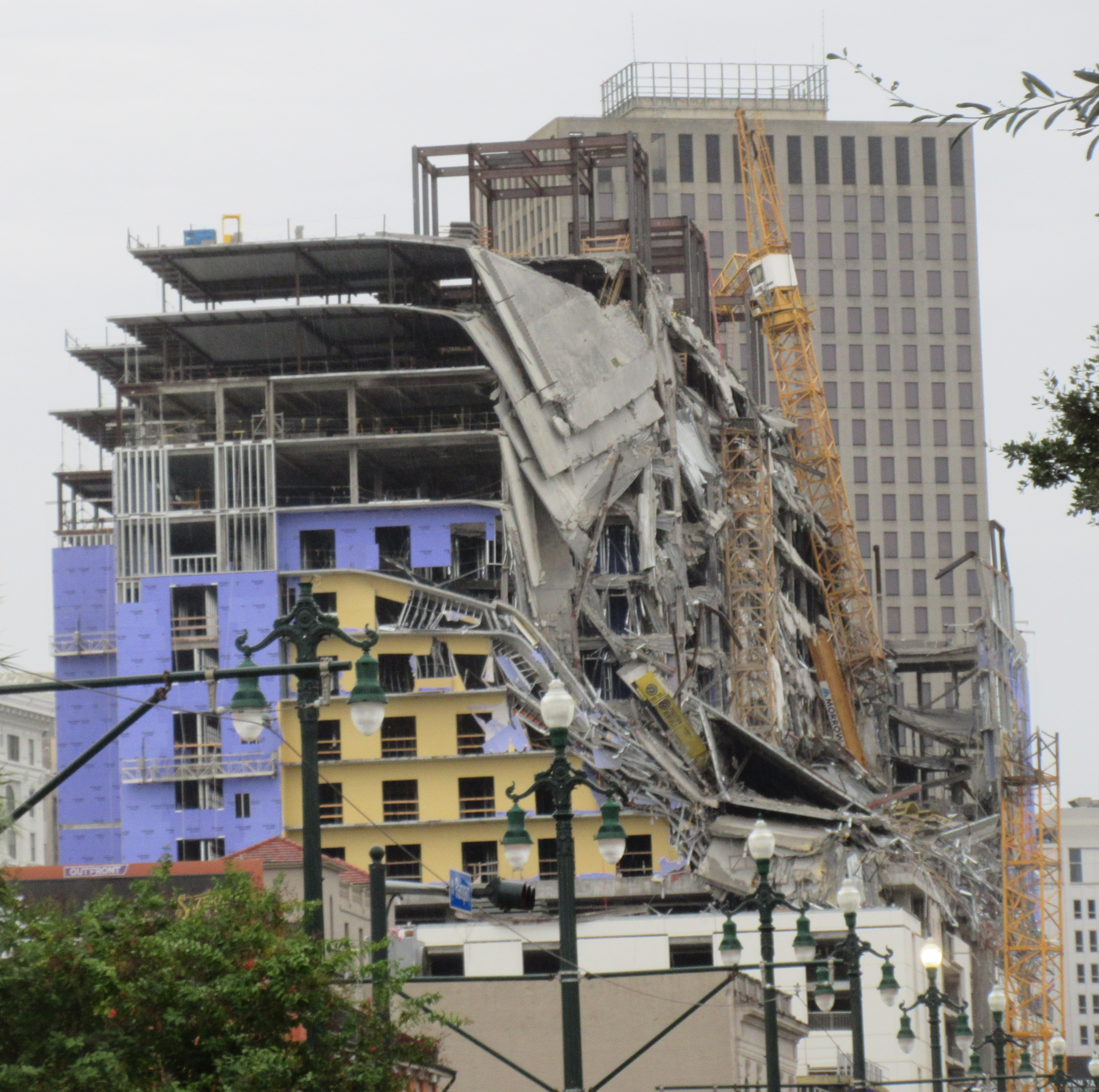
The partially collapsed building seen from Rampart Street, October 2019, with the two tower cranes having been partially demolished

On April 3, 2020, OSHA found that the structural engineer had "failed to adequately design, review or approve steel bolt connections affecting the structural integrity of the building". Some workers and a contractor said they had complained about unsafe practices before the collapse, and one posted a video of what he said was the construction site showing insufficient support for the structure. Investigators said they would evaluate the information. New Orleans Mayor LaToya Cantrell called for the entire building to be demolished.

On January 15, 2020, a petition to demolish three neighboring historic buildings located at 1019 and 1027 Canal, and 1022 Iberville Street was to be considered by the Historic District Landmarks Commission for the Central Business District. At the time, the collapsed 18-story building had not yet been removed. Ultimately, the City of New Orleans issued an emergency declaration ordering the demolition of the neighboring three structures due to safety concerns with the demolition. A few days earlier, the developer had requested a delay in the decision-making process pending the finalization of the demolition methodology.

By April, the developer and the city were in dispute regarding the demolition, with the developer describing code enforcement regarding the demolition as "farcical". In June, demolition of surrounding buildings commenced after the developer was forced to gain approval to conventionally demolish the structure in court over the objections of the City of New Orleans, which was attempting to implode the building. In August, ten months after the collapse, the bodies of the second and third victims were recovered. After repeated delays due to tropical weather, demolition was expected to be complete by that December. By mid-December, the towers were demolished and clearing of debris was underway.

== Investigations and legal actions ==
The New Orleans inspector general's office filed a report with the New Orleans district attorney on or about July 28, 2021 recommending felony charges against a former city building inspector who was supposed to check on work at the Hard Rock Hotel before it collapsed in October 2019. A grand jury found that there was not enough evidence to charge them with a crime. Inspector General Edward Michel also recommended charges against two other former city building inspectors in investigation reports submitted to District Attorney Jason Williams.

Shortly after the collapse in October 2019, Hard Rock International filed a lawsuit in the Orleans Parish Civil District Court against the developer, architects, engineers, and other companies involved in the construction of the building on the behalf of ten of the victims. The suit alleged that "the design, planning, and construction of the structure [...] was inadequate, likely to cause harm, and did cause harm to the plaintiffs and others" and laid out specific claims against the developer. In September 2022, Judge Kern Reese of the Orleans Parish Civil District Court appointed Baton Rouge mediator John Perry Jr. as special master to arbitrate a settlement between a committee of plaintiffs' attorneys and the companies involved under this and other lawsuits.

In October 2023, a grand jury declined to indict anyone on criminal charges relating to the collapse, citing inadequate certainty to proceed. The Orleans Parish district attorney's office was disappointed in the decision, and claimed that OSHA had refused to disclose all evidence at their disposal, which hampered their case.

=== Hard Rock International's response ===
Hard Rock International's response to the collapse involved frustration with, for them, damaged brand reputation, while also offering support through meals for first responders and funding for crane removal. HRI contributed $5 million toward the controlled demolition of two tower cranes that were left precariously hanging over the site after the collapse.

The firm also paid respect to the victims who died in the event following a letter it filed on February 11, 2020 to New Orleans Mayor LaToya Cantrell, but they also asserted that they, or its parent company, the Seminole Tribe of Florida, had no involvement with construction or development, despite licensing its name, as well as not understanding why the structure remained on the site at the time despite being canceled, and "seeking all legal recourse due to the reputation damage," specifically mentioning the "Boycott Hard Rock Movement" in New Orleans that told people to stop going to any Hard Rock Hotel and Casino and Hard Rock Cafe in protest.

The company later filed for another letter to Cantrell on February 12, citing that the event had already passed four months and that its reputation remained damaged. However, Cantrell called the letter a "shameful political stunt," claiming HRI was only speaking up to protect its brand from the growing boycott movement. On August 6, 2026, a $106 million settlement was finally reached.
