= Caesars New Orleans =

Casino in New Orleans, Louisiana, US

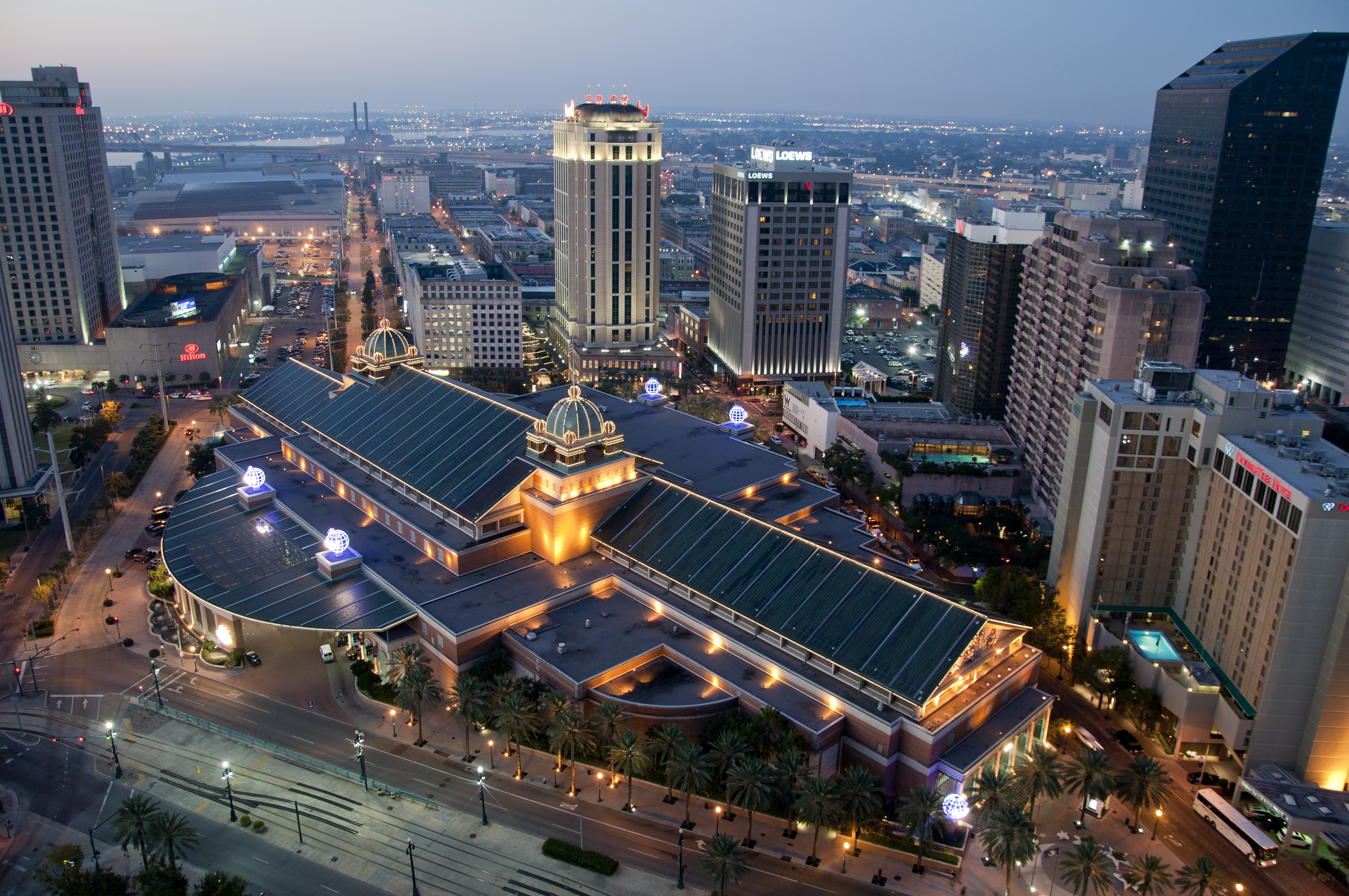
- Interactive map of Caesars New Orleans
- Location: 228 Poydras Street New Orleans, Louisiana 70130; 29°56′59″N 90°3′55″W
- Opened: October 30, 1999; 26 years ago
- No. of rooms: 450
- Gaming space: 115,000 sq ft (10,700 m^{2})
- Notable restaurants: Emeril's Brasserie, Nobu New Orleans, Ruth's Chris
- Casino type: Land-based
- Owner: Vici Properties
- Operating license holder: Caesars Entertainment
- Renovated in: 2005, 2006, 2022
- Website: www.caesars.com/caesars-new-orleans

Caesars New Orleans, formerly Harrah's New Orleans, is a casino in New Orleans, Louisiana, United States, near the foot of Canal Street a block away from the Mississippi River. It is a 115,000 sq ft (10,700 m^{2}) casino with approximately 2,100 slot machines, over 90 table games and a poker room. The casino is owned by Vici Properties and operated by Caesars Entertainment.

Originally opening in 1999 as Harrah's New Orleans, the casino holds the status of being the only land-based casino in the state of Louisiana. It features one of the largest gaming floors in the United States outside of Nevada and several other amenities spread across four city blocks, including eateries from high-profile restaurateurs including Emeril Lagasse and Nobu Matsuhisa, a large sportsbook, a bowling alley, a Manning's sports bar, and two hotel towers.

The casino shut down in the wake of Hurricane Katrina in 2005 but reopened in the midst of Mardi Gras on February 17, 2006.

The location of the casino was previously the site of the Rivergate Convention Center, demolished in 1995. A short tunnel built as part of the canceled Vieux Carré Riverfront Expressway is used for valet parking and for an entrance passing underneath Poydras Street.

== History ==
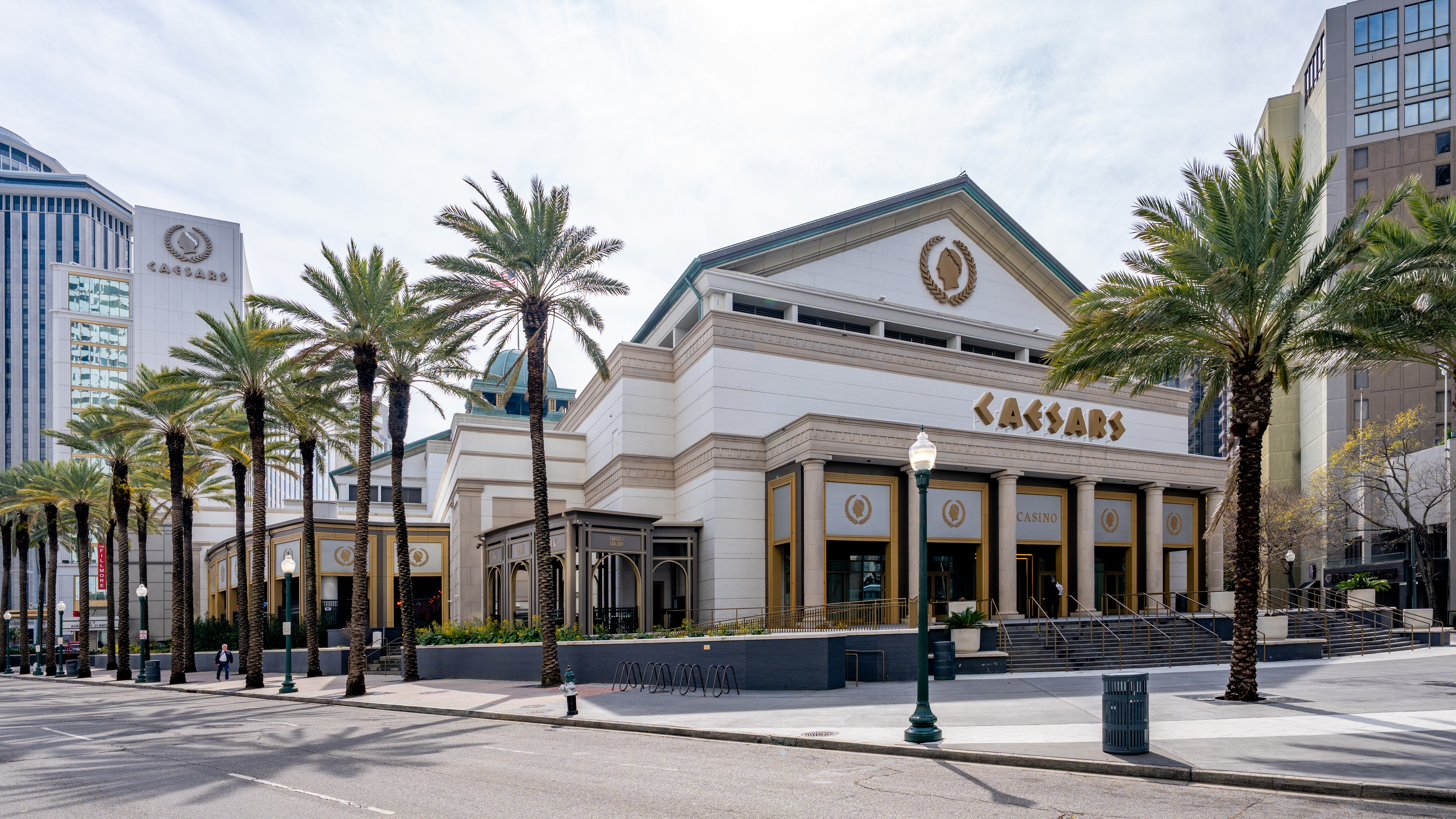
From Street Level (2026)

The casino is the brainchild of Christopher Hemmeter, a hotel developer in the Hawaiian Islands who returned to the mainland in 1991 when he began to develop casino gaming projects including the nearby River City Casino. His biggest project was a proposed $1 billion casino in New Orleans, billed at the time as "the world's largest casino". The original design resembled Monte Carlo's 1861 casino, intending to evoke the New Orleans 1885 Cotton Exposition and Chicago's 1893 World Columbian Exposition. The developers estimated the casino would attract one million additional visitors to the city and would generate annual revenues of as much as $780 million, estimates that were based in part on the proven success of dockside gaming in the Mississippi Gulf Coast area.

In 1993, a partnership of Hemmeter and Caesars World obtained the lease on the Rivergate property, which by law was the only place the land-based casino could be built in Louisiana, beating out a rival bid by Harrah's Entertainment. In August 1993, however, the State Casino Board awarded the state's sole casino license to Harrah's and not the Hemmeter-Caesar's partnership. The impasse of one company owning the only license and another owning the only lease was resolved when the two entities formed a joint venture under pressure from then-Governor Edwin Edwards. The new entity, known as "Harrah's Jazz", established a temporary casino in the Municipal Auditorium to establish a cash flow while the main facility was under construction at the Rivergate. The temporary facility opened in May 1995 and was closed a week later due to a flood. The poor location of the site resulted in the actual gaming take falling 60% below projections at only $13.1 million per month. Equally concerning was that 60% of gamers at the temporary facility were locals and not out-of-town tourists, undercutting the economic benefit backers hoped gambling would provide to the tourist industry.

Harrah's Jazz halted construction on the permanent facility at 3 AM the day before Thanksgiving, 1995 and laid off 1,600 construction workers and 2,500 casino employees, and filed for bankruptcy. Later, the project was taken over by Harrah's, who completed (albeit scaled-back with only the first floor in use to this day) and opened in late October 1999 Harrah's New Orleans Casino on the site of Hemmeter's project.

As Harrah's, the casino featured extensive New Orleans, Mardi Gras, and pirate theming with ornate Mardi Gras busts and murals, along with French Quarter facades adorning much of the casino. Additional amenities included a large nightclub, several bars, a theater, and a steakhouse.

Since its opening in 1999 Harrah's has been renting nearby hotel rooms to accommodate its guests, using the nearby 202-room Wyndham Riverfront Hotel and Hilton Riverside to provide accommodations. To avoid leasing rooms, the casino opened its own 27-story hotel tower with 450 rooms across the street from the casino on September 21, 2006, just days ahead of the New Orleans Saints return to the Louisiana Superdome.

Due to a new local ordinance affecting bars and casinos located in Orleans Parish, in 2015 Harrah's New Orleans became 100% smoke free inside the building. To appease its smoking clientele, the casino was allowed to open multiple outdoor "smoking patios" to allow gamblers to play and smoke at the same time.

In July 2020, Eldorado Resorts acquired Caesars Entertainment (the former Harrah's Entertainment), taking over operations of the property. In connection with that acquisition, Vici Properties bought the real estate of Harrah's New Orleans for $790 million and leased it back to Eldorado (newly renamed as Caesars Entertainment).

In 2020, it was announced that the casino would be rebranded as Caesars New Orleans, with the name officially changing in May 2024. Renovations began in late 2021, with the casino's porte-cochère demolished for the construction of a second hotel tower. From 2021 to 2024, phases of the casino were closed and updated to match the Caesars theming and to add new amenities, such as an expanded sportsbook and high-limit room. The conversion to Caesars is expected to be completed by November 1st, 2024, with the opening of the new hotel tower.

== See also ==
- List of casinos in Louisiana
