= St. Charles Streetcar Line =

Streetcar line in New Orleans, Louisiana

12 St. Charles
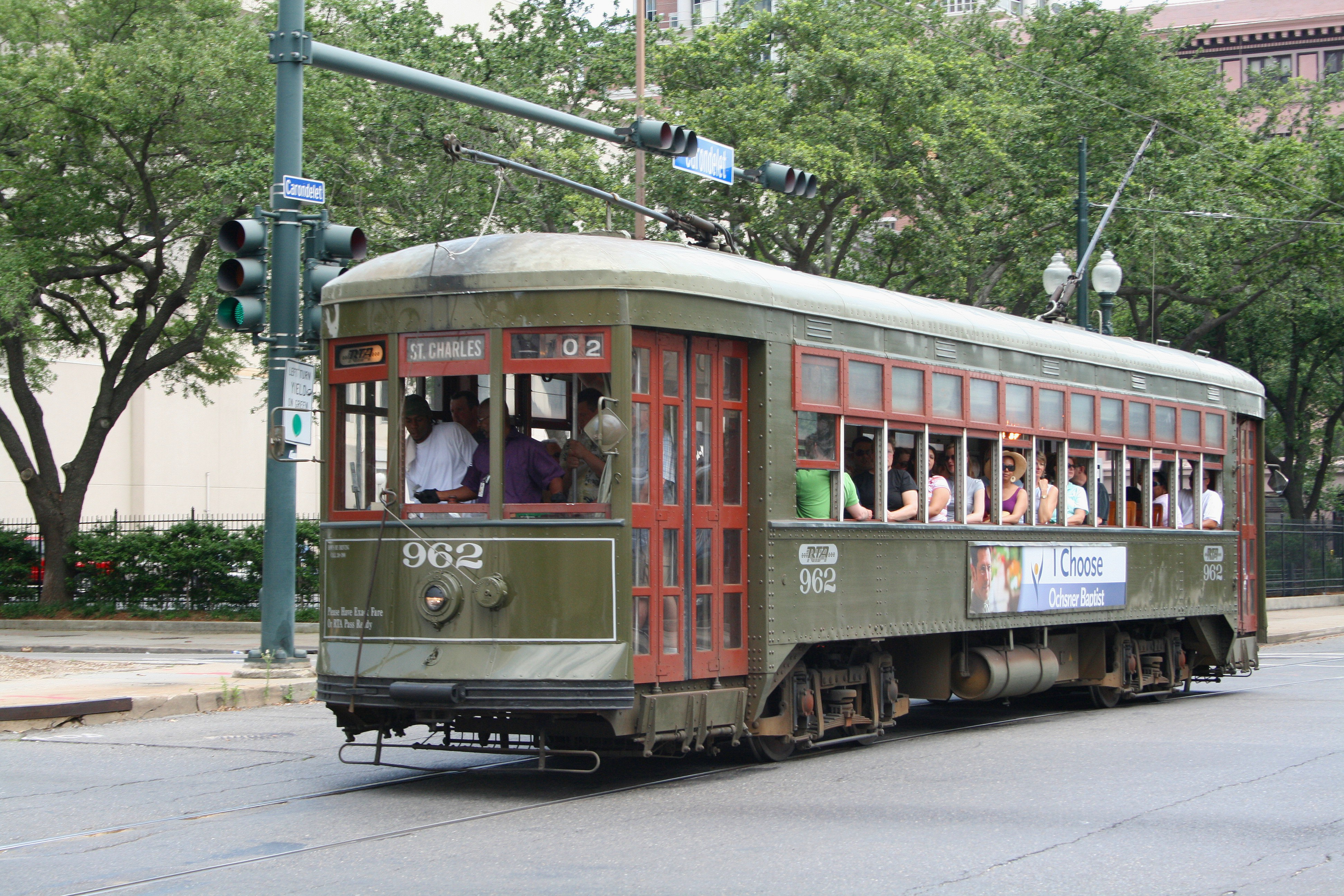
- St. Charles Streetcar passing through the New Orleans Central Business District

Overview
- Owner: New Orleans Regional Transit Authority
- Line number: 12
- Locale: New Orleans, Louisiana
- Termini: South Carrollton and South Claiborne; Carondelet and Canal
- Stations: 61

Service
- Type: Heritage streetcar
- System: Streetcars in New Orleans
- Depot: Carrollton Transit Station
- Rolling stock: 900 series; 457 series

History
- Opened: September 26, 1835; 190 years ago

Technical
- Line length: 6.6 mi (10.6 km)
- Number of tracks: 2
- Character: Primarily in neutral ground (central median), street running between Howard Avenue and Canal Street
- Track gauge: 5 ft 2 1/2 in (1,588 mm)
- Electrification: Overhead line, 600 V DC
- St. Charles Streetcar Line
- U.S. National Register of Historic Places
- U.S. National Historic Landmark
- Interactive map of St. Charles Streetcar Line
- NRHP reference No.: 73000873

Significant dates
- Added to NRHP: May 23, 1973
- Designated NHL: August 25, 2014

The St. Charles Streetcar Line is a historic streetcar line in New Orleans, Louisiana, US. Running since 1835, it is the oldest continuously operating streetcar line in the world. It is operated by the New Orleans Regional Transit Authority (RTA). Officially the St. Charles Streetcar line is designated as Route 12, and it runs along its namesake, St. Charles Avenue. It is the busiest route in the RTA system as it is heavily used by local commuters and tourists. On most RTA maps and publications, it is denoted in green, which is also the color of the streetcars on this line.

The St. Charles Streetcar Line is listed on the National Register of Historic Places and is one of two street railways that are National Historic Landmarks, the other being the San Francisco cable car system.

== Route ==
The St. Charles Line starts uptown, at South Carrollton Avenue and South Claiborne Avenue. It runs on South Carrollton Avenue through the Carrollton neighborhood towards the Mississippi River, then near the river levee turns on to St. Charles Avenue. It proceeds past entrances to Audubon Park, Tulane University and Loyola University New Orleans, continues through Uptown New Orleans including the Garden District, and ends at Canal Street in the New Orleans Central Business District at the edge of the French Quarter, a distance of 6 miles (9.7 km). With the exception of Carondelet Street and the downtown portion of St. Charles where the line runs in the curbside lane, most of the line runs in the neutral ground (the median strip) with greenery between the tracks.

== History ==
Planning for the line began in 1831, and work began as the New Orleans and Carrollton Railroad in February 1833, the second railway in Greater New Orleans after the Pontchartrain Railroad. Passenger and freight services by steam locomotives began on September 26, 1835, originally without a dedicated right-of-way (it ran on public streets), although one was eventually established in the neutral ground (the median). Service began as a suburban railroad, since Carrollton was at that time a separate city, while areas along the route were still mostly undeveloped. Two locomotives New Orleans and Carrollton were supplied from England by B. Hick and Sons.

As the area along the line became more urbanized, objections to the soot and noise produced by the locomotives increased, and transport was switched to cars that were powered by horses and mules. For decades in the late 19th century, desire for a mode of transit more swift and powerful than horses but without the disruptive effects of locomotives resulted in a number of systems being tried out. Experimental systems included overhead cable propulsion (with a cable clamp patented by P. G. T. Beauregard in 1869 later being adapted for the San Francisco cable car system), and several innovative designs by Dr. Emile Lamm, including ammonia engines, a "Chloride of Calcium Engine", and most successfully Lamm Fireless Engine which not only propelled pairs of cars along the line in the 1880s but was adopted by the street railways of Paris.

While the city's first experiments with electric-powered cars were made in 1884 (in conjunction with the World Cotton Centennial World's Fair), electric streetcars were not considered sufficiently developed for widespread use until the following decade, and the line was electrified February 1, 1893. At the same time, it was extended from the corner of St. Charles and Carrollton Avenues to continue eight blocks out Carrollton to a new car barn at Willow Street.

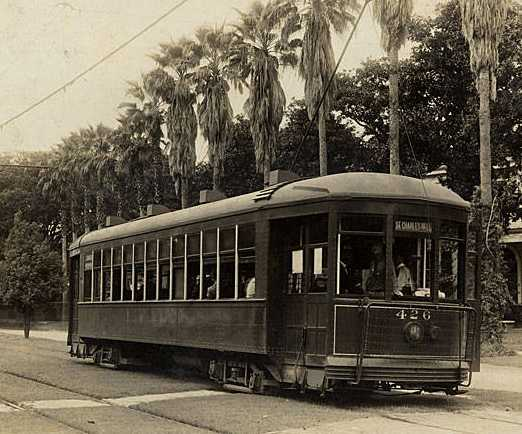
A 400 series streetcar operating on the line, c. 1910s.

In 1900, the St. Charles and Tulane streetcar lines were extended on Carrollton Avenue and connected together, resulting in a two-way belt line. Cars signed St. Charles left Canal Street on Baronne Street to Howard Avenue to St. Charles Avenue, thence all the way to Carrollton and out that avenue, returning to the central business district on Tulane Avenue. Streetcars leaving Canal Street on Tulane Avenue were signed Tulane, operating out to Carrollton Avenue, then turning riverward to St. Charles Avenue, passing Lee Circle to Howard Avenue, and finally down Baronne (later Carondelet) to Canal Street.

In 1922 the New Orleans & Carrollton Rail Road was merged into New Orleans Public Service Incorporated (NOPSI), which consolidated the city's various streetcar lines and electrical production.

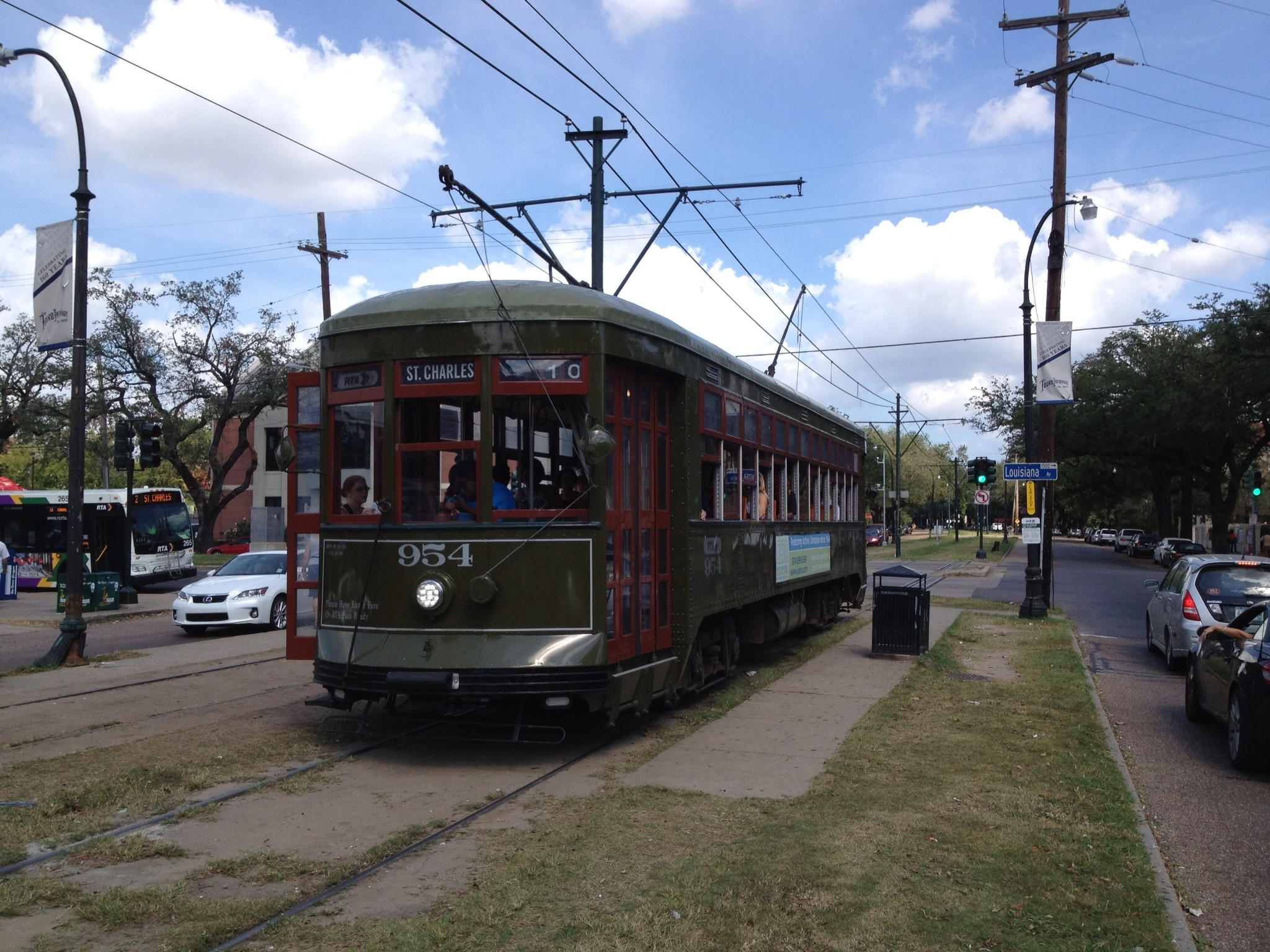
900 series streetcar running on the line.

In 1950, plans were made to fill in the New Basin Canal, which the Belt Lines crossed on a bridge on Carrollton Avenue. The right of way was to be used for the Pontchartrain Expressway, and Carrollton Avenue traffic was to use an underpass. Rather than rebuild tracks in the underpass, the Tulane and St. Charles lines were separated, and Tulane Avenue was converted to a trolley coach line. During construction, the St. Charles line continued to operate (in both directions) all the way on Carrollton Avenue from St. Charles Avenue to the underpass construction site at Dixon Street. Once the underpass was completed, the St. Charles streetcar line was cut back to Claiborne Avenue, as it operates at present, and the Tulane trolley coach line took over the part of Carrollton Avenue between Tulane Avenue and Claiborne.

In 1972 automatic fareboxes were introduced, and the job of a separate conductor was eliminated from the streetcars. The line still has one of the Ford, Bacon & Davis 1894 vintage cars in running condition. Although it is not used for passenger service, it stays busy with work operations such as track sanding. The rest of the line's cars date from 1923–24.

In 1973, preservationists successfully listed the St. Charles line on the National Register of Historic Places. But it is not possible to provide the historic cars with wheelchair access doors and lifts in compliance with the Americans with Disabilities Act (ADA). For this reason, it has been the only service in the system not to have wheelchair access.

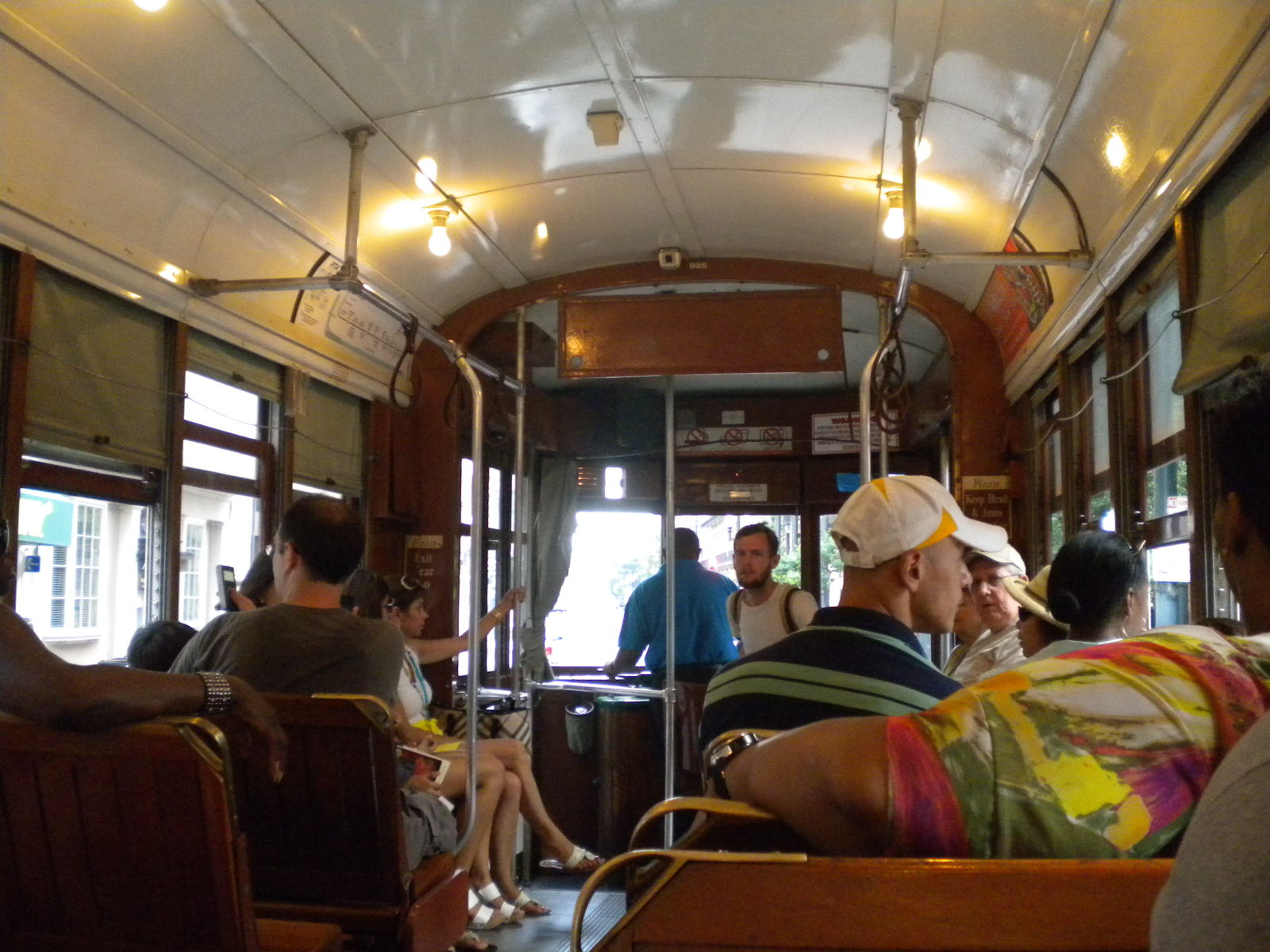
Interior of a 900 series streetcar

In 1983, the RTA was created to oversee public transportation in New Orleans. It assumed the operations of city bus lines and the St. Charles line from NOPSI, which has since folded into Entergy.

In 2005, service along the route was suspended due to damage from Hurricane Katrina and the floods from levee breaches. The small section from Canal Street to Lee Circle was the first part restored. The section continuing up to Napoleon Avenue was re-opened for service on November 11, 2007, and on December 23, 2007, was extended up to Carrollton Avenue, near the line's original terminus in 1833. The restoration of the line on the remaining section along Carrollton Avenue to Claiborne Avenue took place on June 22, 2008.

The St. Charles line was listed by the National Park Service as a National Historic Landmark in 2014. This recognizes it as a place that possesses "exceptional value and quality in illustrating or interpreting the heritage of the United States," quoting the announcement from the Department of the Interior. It joins the San Francisco cable car system as one of only two moving streetcar National Historic Landmarks. (There are other moving landmarks, such as ships and trains.)

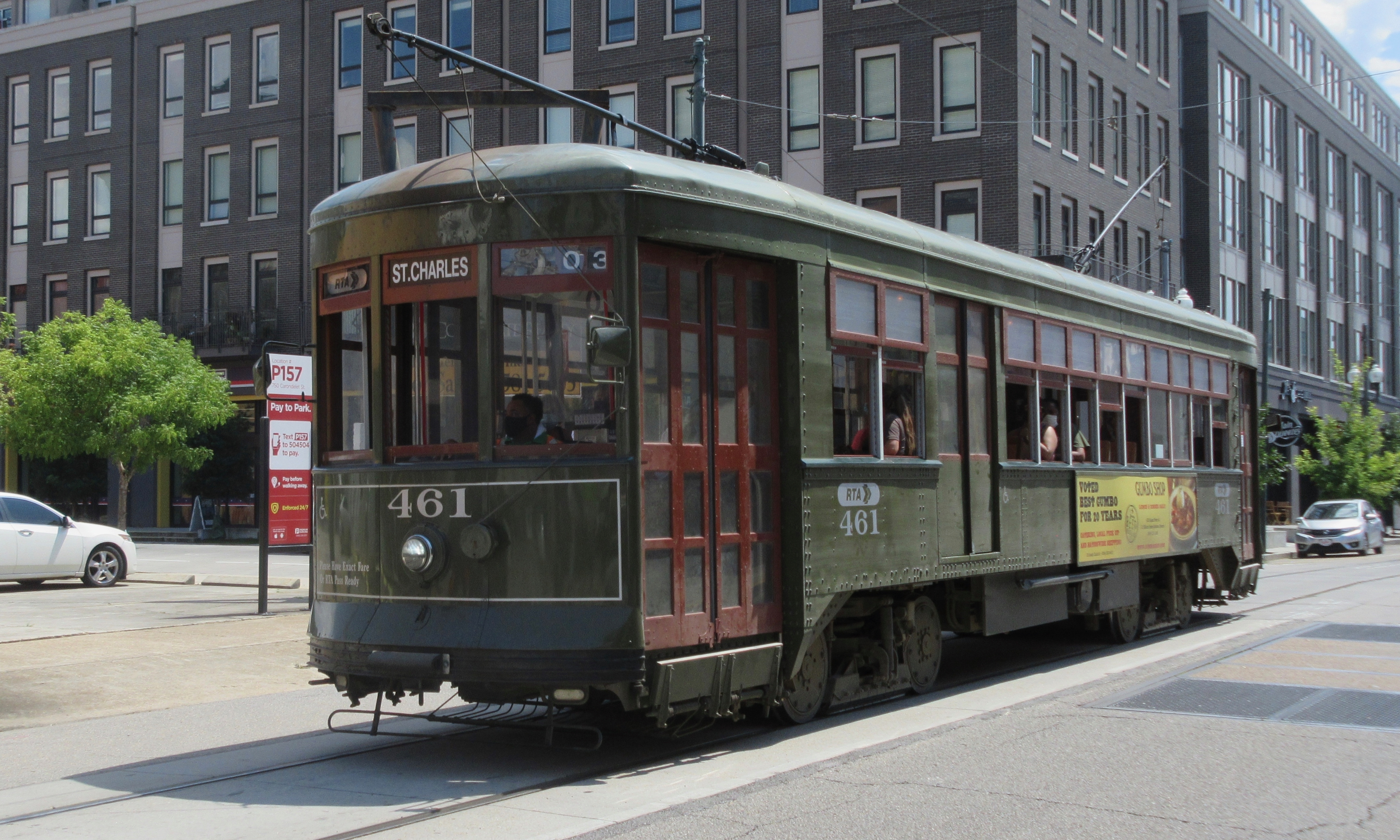
457 series streetcar on the line, a wheelchair lift is located behind the center door

Following a lawsuit over accessibility, the RTA entered into a consent decree in 2017, agreeing to make six stops accessible: the terminals at each end of the line and stops at Napoleon, Louisiana, Jackson, and an additional stop near Riverbend, later designated as South Carrollton Avenue at St. Charles Avenue. The agreement also required the addition of at least one wheelchair lift-equipped car to the line, but the historic Perley Thomas streetcars were not to be modified.

To comply with the decree, RTA renovated three 457 series cars by 2020 (and by 2026, all the rest of the 457-463 series) that had originally been built with wheelchair lifts for the Riverfront Line, allowing the St. Charles line to meet the requirements of the Americans with Disabilities Act of 1990 (ADA). The cars were repainted from red to the line's traditional green livery and carry wheelchair symbols on their ends and sides. RTA also rebuilt stops at six major intersections to provide wheelchair access. Accessible service on the St. Charles line began on December 1, 2020.

In May 2024, the Federal Transit Administration awarded RTA $5.5 million to construct additional accessible platforms on the line.

== Operation ==
The St. Charles Streetcar Line operates 24 hours a day, with frequent service most of the day (7 a.m. to 10 p.m.), with cars coming every nine minutes. Cars operate every 18 minutes early morning (before 7 a.m.) and late night (10 p.m. to midnight), with 36-minute intervals in the night owl period (midnight to 6 a.m.).

The principal equipment of the line consists of the 900 series, a group of 35 streetcars built in 1923–24 by the Perley A. Thomas Car Works. They have been rebuilt several times during their long service life. The line also uses seven 457 series Perley Thomas replica streetcars equipped with a wheelchair lift.

== List of streetcar stops ==
From Central Business District to Uptown

Stop	Disabled access	Neighborhood(s)	Other streetcar lines	Notes
Canal St & Carondelet St	Disabled access	Central Business District, French Quarter	47 48	Eastern (inbound) terminus of line Transfer point to Canal Streetcar Line; Carondelet continues as Bourbon Street into the French Quarter; Line turns back on dedicated track in Canal Street neutral ground apart from the tracks for other lines
By way of St. Charles Avenue (outbound) or Carondelet Street (inbound)
St. Charles & Common (outbound)		Central Business District		
St. Charles & Union St (outbound); Carondelet & Gravier St (inbound)		Central Business District		
Poydras St		Central Business District		Serves Hancock Whitney Center, the tallest building in New Orleans and the state of Louisiana
Lafayette St (outbound)		Central Business District		Serves Gallier Hall, Hale Boggs Federal Building and Lafayette Square
Girod St		Central Business District, Arts and Warehouse District		
Julia St		Arts and Warehouse District		
St. Charles & St. Joseph St (outbound); Howard Ave & Carondelet St (inbound)		Arts and Warehouse District		
By way of St. Charles Avenue between Tivoli Circle and Carrollton Avenue
Tivoli Circle		Arts and Warehouse District		Stop is located south of Tivoli Circle where inbound and outbound tracks meet Serves Civil War Museum, Contemporary Arts Museum, National World War II Museum and Ogden Museum of Southern Art
Erato St		Central City, Lower Garden District		
Martin Luther King Jr. Bl / Melpomene St		Central City, Lower Garden District		
Euterpe St		Central City, Lower Garden District		
Felicity St		Central City, Lower Garden District		
St. Andrew St		Central City, Lower Garden District		
Josephine St		Central City, Lower Garden District		
Jackson Ave	Disabled access	Central City, Lower Garden District		
First St		Central City, Garden District		
Third St		Central City, Garden District		
Washington Ave		Central City, Garden District		
Sixth St		Central City, Garden District		
Eighth St		Central City, Garden District		
Louisiana Ave	Disabled access	Milan, Tuoro		
Foucher St		Milan, Tuoro		
Peniston St		Milan, Tuoro		
Constantinople St		Milan, Tuoro		
Milan St		Milan, Tuoro		
Napoleon Ave	Disabled access	Milan, Touro, Uptown		
Jena St		Uptown		
Cadiz St		Uptown		
Bordeaux St		Uptown		
Robert St		Uptown		
Duffosat St (inbound)		Uptown		
Valmont St		Uptown		
Jefferson Ave		Audubon, Uptown		
Joseph St		Audubon		
Nashville Ave		Audubon		
State St		Audubon		
Webster St		Audubon		
Calhoun St		Audubon		
Exposition Blvd		Audubon		
Tulane / Loyola		Audubon		Stop at intersection of St. Charles and West Road; Serves Audubon Park, Tulane University and Loyola University
Tulane University		Audubon		Stop at intersection of St. Charles and Law Road; Serves Audubon Park and Tulane University
Walnut St		Audubon		Serves Audubon Park
Broadway St		Audubon		Serves St. Charles Avenue Baptist Church & Loyola Law School
Lowerline St		Audubon, Black Pearl, East Carrollton		
Hillary St		Black Pearl, East Carrollton		
Burdette St (inbound)		Black Pearl, East Carrollton		
Fern St (outbound)		Black Pearl, East Carrollton		
By way of South Carrollton Avenue between St. Charles and South Claiborne avenues
St. Charles Ave	Disabled access	Black Pearl, East Carrollton, Leonidas		Stop is located in the neutral ground of Carrollton right after the tracks turn northward through the St. Charles intersection near the riverbend of the Mississippi River
Maple St		East Carrollton, Leonidas		
Freret St		East Carrollton, Leonidas		
Oak St		East Carrollton, Leonidas		Serves Oak Street shopping district
Willow St		East Carrollton, Leonidas		Tracks diverge via Willow and Jeanette streets to the Carrollton Station car barn
Jeanette St (inbound)		East Carrollton, Leonidas		
Birch St (outbound)		East Carrollton, Leonidas		
Spruce St		East Carrollton, Leonidas		
Sycamore St		Fontainebleau, Leonidas		Serves Marsalis Harmony Park
South Claiborne Ave	Disabled access	Fontainebleau, Leonidas		Western (outbound) terminus of line

== See also ==
- History of New Orleans
- List of National Historic Landmarks in Louisiana
- National Register of Historic Places listings in Orleans Parish, Louisiana
