= Audubon, New Orleans =

Audubon University District
- Neighborhood
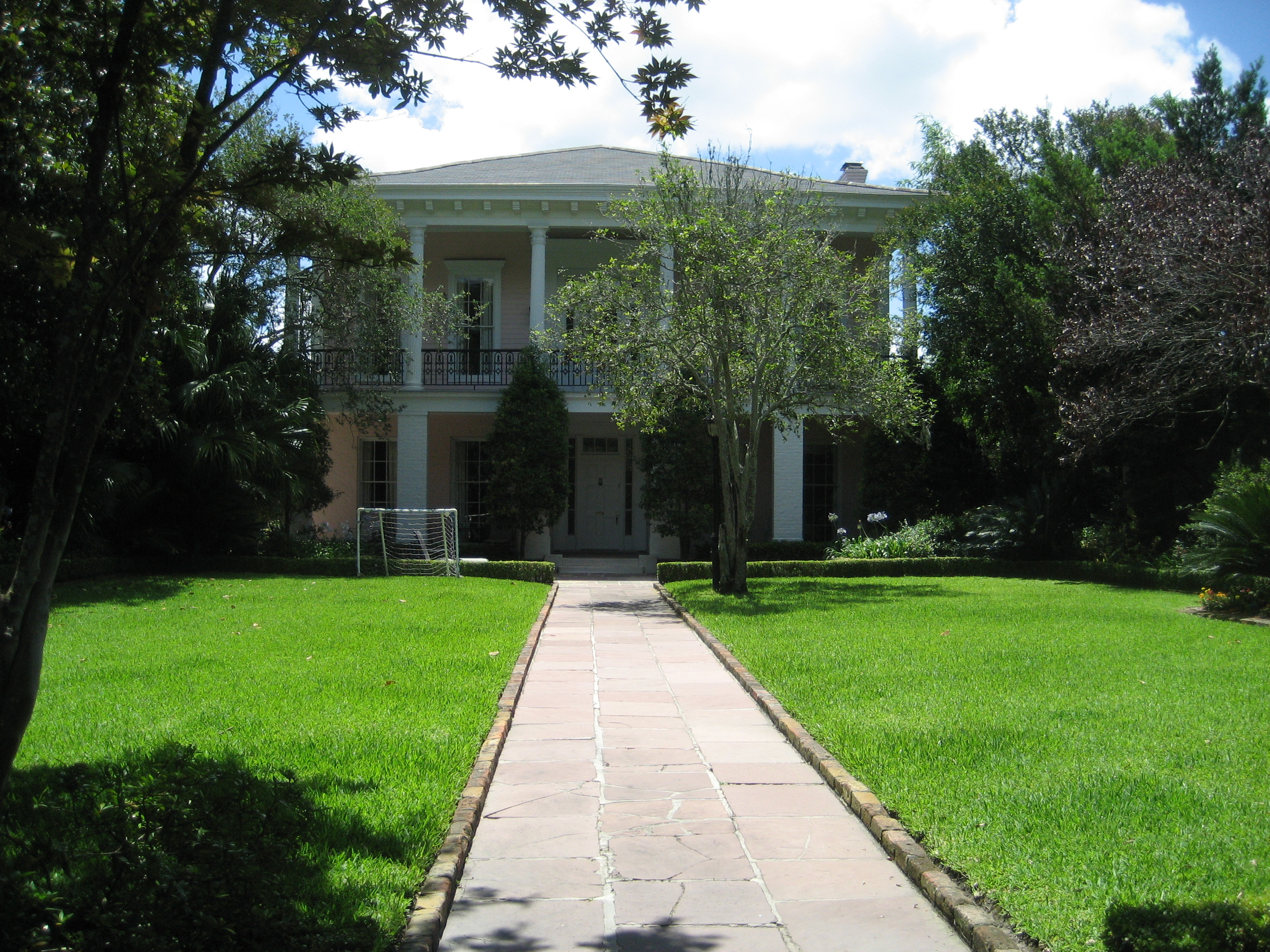
- Christian Roselius House in the Greenville Section
- Etymology: Audubon Park
- Interactive map of Audubon
- Coordinates: 29°55′59″N 90°07′15″W
- Country: United States
- State: Louisiana
- City: New Orleans
- Planning District: District 3, Uptown/Carrollton

Area
  - Total: 2.28 sq mi (5.9 km^{2})
  - Land: 2.14 sq mi (5.5 km^{2})
  - Water: 0.15 sq mi (0.39 km^{2})
- Elevation: 3 ft (0.91 m)

Population (2010)
  - Total: 7,319
  - Density: 3,420/sq mi (1,320/km^{2})
- Time zone: UTC-6 (CST)
  - Summer (DST): UTC-5 (CDT)
- Area code: 504

Audubon is a neighborhood of the city of New Orleans. A subdistrict of the Uptown/Carrollton Area, its boundaries as defined by the New Orleans City Planning Commission are: South Claiborne Avenue to the north, Jefferson Avenue to the east, the Mississippi River and Magazine Street to the south, and Lowerline Street to the west. The name Audubon comes from Audubon Park, one of the largest parks in the city, which is located in the southern portion of the district. The area is also known as the "University District," as it is also home of Tulane and Loyola Universities, as well as the former St. Mary’s Dominican College (now a satellite campus of Loyola), and Newcomb College (now part of Tulane). The Audubon neighborhood was also the home of the original campus of Leland University. The section of the neighborhood upriver from Audubon Park incorporates what was the town of Greenville, Louisiana until it was annexed to New Orleans in the 19th century; locals still sometimes call that area "Greenville".

== Geography ==
Audubon is located at 29°55′59″N 90°07′15″W and has an elevation of 3 feet (0.91 m). According to the United States Census Bureau, the district has a total area of 2.28 square miles (5.9 km^{2}). 2.14 square miles (5.5 km^{2}) of which is land and 0.15 square miles (0.39 km^{2}) (6.58%) of which is water.

Some of the most spectacular mansions reside in this area of the city. Areas of note are the houses that line St. Charles Avenue and the gated community Audubon Place.

=== Adjacent Neighborhoods ===
- Marlyville/Fontainebleau (north)
- Freret (east)
- Uptown, New Orleans (east)
- West Riverside (south)
- Mississippi River (south)
- Black Pearl (west)
- East Carrollton (west)

=== Boundaries ===
The New Orleans City Planning Commission defines the boundaries of Audubon as these streets: South Claiborne Avenue, Jefferson Avenue, Magazine Street, Webster Street, Tchoupitoulas Street, Exposition Place, the Mississippi River, Broadway Street, Perrier Street, Lowerline Street.

== Demographics ==
As of the census of 2000, there were 14,898 people, 5,700 households, and 2,724 families residing in the neighborhood. The population density was 6,534 /mi^{2} (2,523 /km^{2}). The racial makeup of the neighborhood was 5.1% African American, 86.1% White, 2.4% Asian, 0.2% Native American, 0.3% from other races, and 1.5% from two or more races. Hispanic or Latino of any race were 4.4% of the population.

As of the census of 2010, there were 15,865 people, 5,335 households, and 2,607 families residing in the neighborhood. The racial makeup of the neighborhood was 4.8% African American, 85.0% White, 3.2% Asian, 0.1% Native American, 0.3% from other races, and 1.5% from two or more races. Hispanic or Latino of any race were 5.0% of the population.

== See also ==
- New Orleans neighborhoods
