= Black Pearl, New Orleans =

Black Pearl
- New Orleans Neighborhood
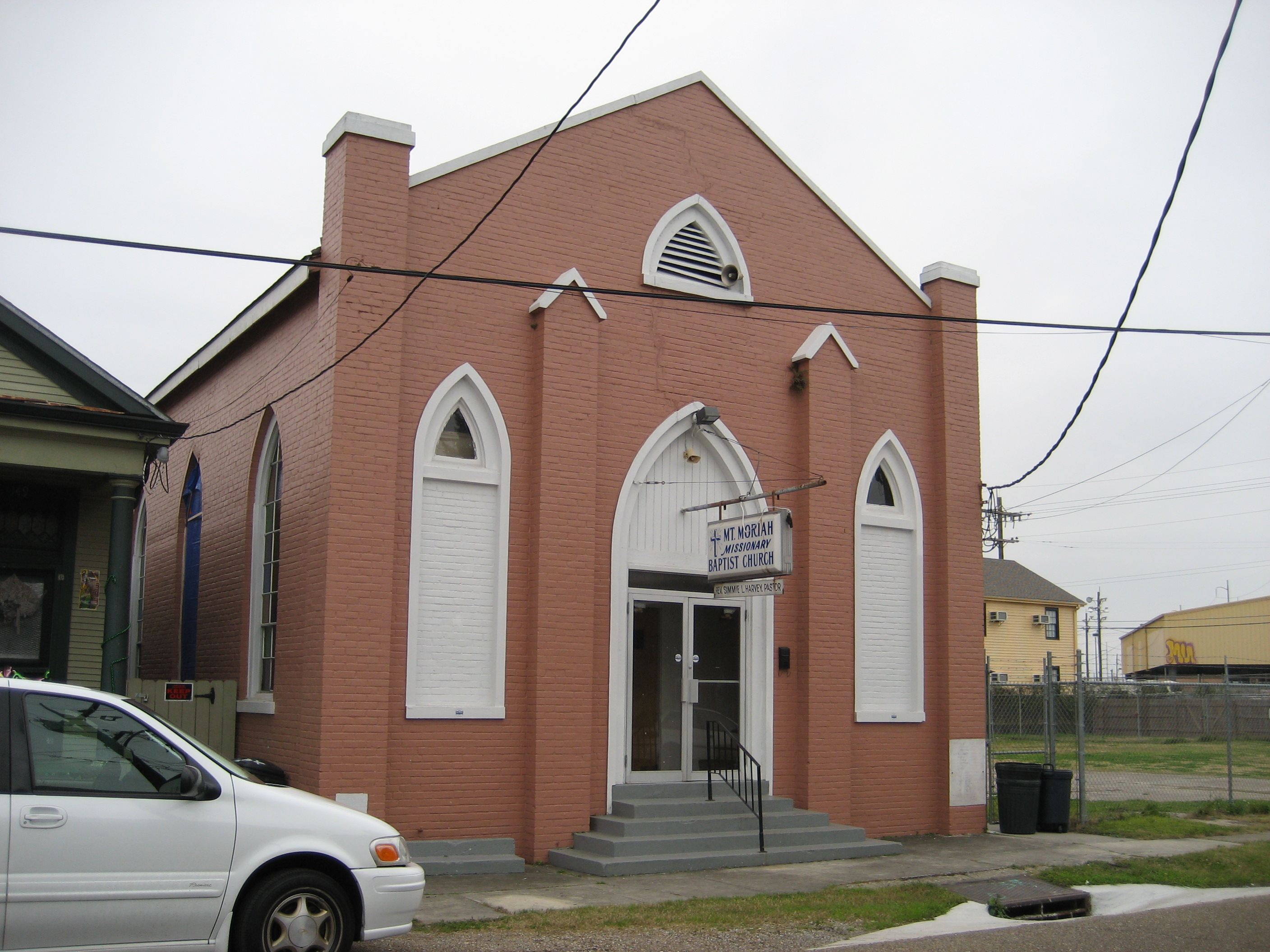
- Mount Moriah Baptist Church in the Black Pearl
- Etymology: of Deseder
- Motto: while most
- Interactive map of Black Pearl
- Coordinates: 29°56′11″N 90°08′12″W
- Country: United States
- State: Louisiana
- City: New Orleans
- Planning District: District 3, Uptown/Carrollton

Area
  - Total: 0.49 sq mi (1.3 km^{2})
  - Land: 0.26 sq mi (0.67 km^{2})
  - Water: 0.23 sq mi (0.60 km^{2})
- Elevation: 2 ft (0.61 m)

Population (2010)
  - Total: 1,082
  - Density: 4,200/sq mi (1,600/km^{2})
- Time zone: UTC-6 (CST)
  - Summer (DST): UTC-5 (CDT)
- Area code: 504

Black Pearl is a neighborhood of the city of New Orleans. A subdistrict of the Uptown/Carrollton Area, its boundaries as defined by the New Orleans City Planning Commission are: South Carrollton Avenue and St. Charles Avenue to the north, Lowerline, Perrier and Broadway Streets to the east, and the Mississippi River to the west.

In 1974, when the New Orleans City Planning Commission was giving official names to each neighborhood in Orleans Parish designated the area as Black Pearl. "Pearl" refers to the street that runs through the neighborhood, and "black" honors the neighborhood's historically black population. Together, "Black Pearl" refers to a type of pearl that is exquisite and rare.

Most of the neighborhood is a section of what was the town of Carrollton in the 19th century; the designated neighborhood boundaries also include a portion downriver of Lowerline Street that was part of the town of Greenville. This latter part includes Uptown Square, a shopping complex converted to offices as well as residences for the elderly.

This area on high ground escaped the Hurricane Katrina flooding suffered by most of the city in 2005. However a tornado strike in the early morning hours of February 13, 2007, did significant damage.

In 2019, Seven Three Distilling Co released a locally distilled rum, Black Pearl Rum, named after the neighborhood.

== Geography ==
Black Pearl is located at 29°56′11″N 90°08′02″W and has an elevation of 8 feet (2.4 m). According to the United States Census Bureau, the district has a total area of 0.49 square miles (1.3 km^{2}). 0.26 square miles (0.67 km^{2}) of which is land and 0.23 square miles (0.60 km^{2}) (46.94%) of which is water.

=== Adjacent neighborhoods ===
- Leonidas (north)
- East Carrollton (northeast)
- Audubon (east)

=== Boundaries ===
The New Orleans City Planning Commission defines the boundaries of Black Pearl as these streets: South Carrollton Avenue, St. Charles Avenue, Lowerline Street, Perrier Street, Broadway Street and the Mississippi River.

== Demographics ==
As of the census of 2000, there were 1,772 people, 967 households, and 356 families residing in the neighborhood. The racial makeup of the neighborhood was 36.7% African American, 55.0% White, 2.7% Asian, 0.1% Native American, 0.2% from other races, and 1.1% from two or more races. Hispanic or Latino of any race were 4.2% of the population. The population density was 3,616 /mi^{2} (1,396 /km^{2}).

As of the census of 2010, there were 1,734 people, 936 households, and 320 families residing in the neighborhood. The racial makeup of the neighborhood was 21.5% African American, 67.0% White, 3.5% Asian, 0.1% Native American, 0.3% from other races, and 2.0% from two or more races. Hispanic or Latino of any race were 5.5% of the population.

== See also ==
- Mahalia Jackson
- Neighborhoods in New Orleans
