= East Carrollton, New Orleans =

Neighborhood in New Orleans, Louisiana, US

East Carrollton
- New Orleans Neighborhood
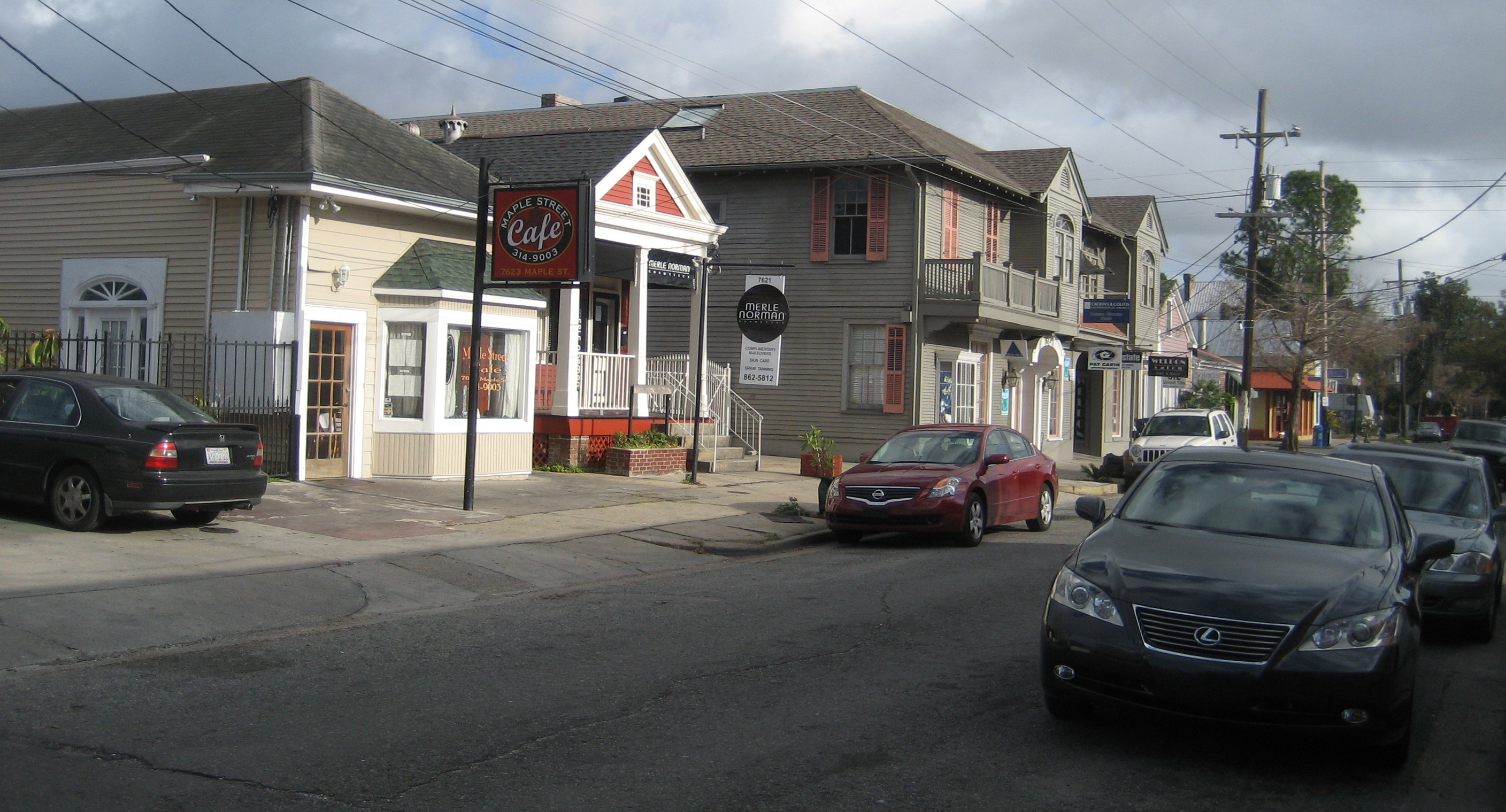
- Shops along Maple Street
- Interactive map of East Carrollton
- Coordinates: 29°56′46″N 90°07′36″W
- Country: United States
- State: Louisiana
- City: New Orleans
- Planning District: District 3, Uptown/Carrollton

Area
  - Total: 0.38 sq mi (0.98 km^{2})
  - Land: 0.38 sq mi (0.98 km^{2})
  - Water: 0.00 sq mi (0 km^{2})
- Elevation: 0 ft (0 m)

Population (2010)
  - Total: 2,244
  - Density: 5,900/sq mi (2,300/km^{2})
- Time zone: UTC-6 (CST)
  - Summer (DST): UTC-5 (CDT)
- Area code: 504

East Carrollton is a neighborhood of the city of New Orleans. A subdistrict of the Uptown/Carrollton Area, its boundaries as defined by the New Orleans City Planning Commission are: Spruce Street to the northeast, Lowerline Street to the southeast, St. Charles Avenue to the southwest and South Carrollton Avenue to the northwest.

This was a portion of what was the city of Carrollton, Louisiana, before it was annexed to the city of New Orleans in the 19th century.

Landmarks include the Maple Street commercial district, Carrollton Cemeteries No. 1 and 2 and Adams Street Grocery.

== Geography ==
East Carrollton is located at 29°56′46″N 90°07′36″W and has an elevation of 0 feet (0.0 m). According to the United States Census Bureau, the district has a total area of 0.38 square miles (1.0 km^{2}). 0.38 square miles (1.0 km^{2}) of which is land and 0.00 square miles (0.0 km^{2}) (0.0%) of which is water.

=== Adjacent Neighborhoods ===
- Fontainebleau (northeast)
- Audubon (southeast)
- Black Pearl (southwest)
- Leonidas (northwest)

=== Boundaries ===
The New Orleans City Planning Commission defines the boundaries of East Carrollton as these streets: Spruce Street, Lowerline Street, St. Charles Avenue and South Carrollton Avenue.

== Demographics ==
As of the census of 2000, there were 4,438 people, 2,182 households, and 883 families residing in the neighborhood. The population density was 11,679 /mi^{2} (4,438 /km^{2}).

As of the census of 2010, there were 4,253 people, 2,084 households, and 821 families residing in the neighborhood.

== Education ==
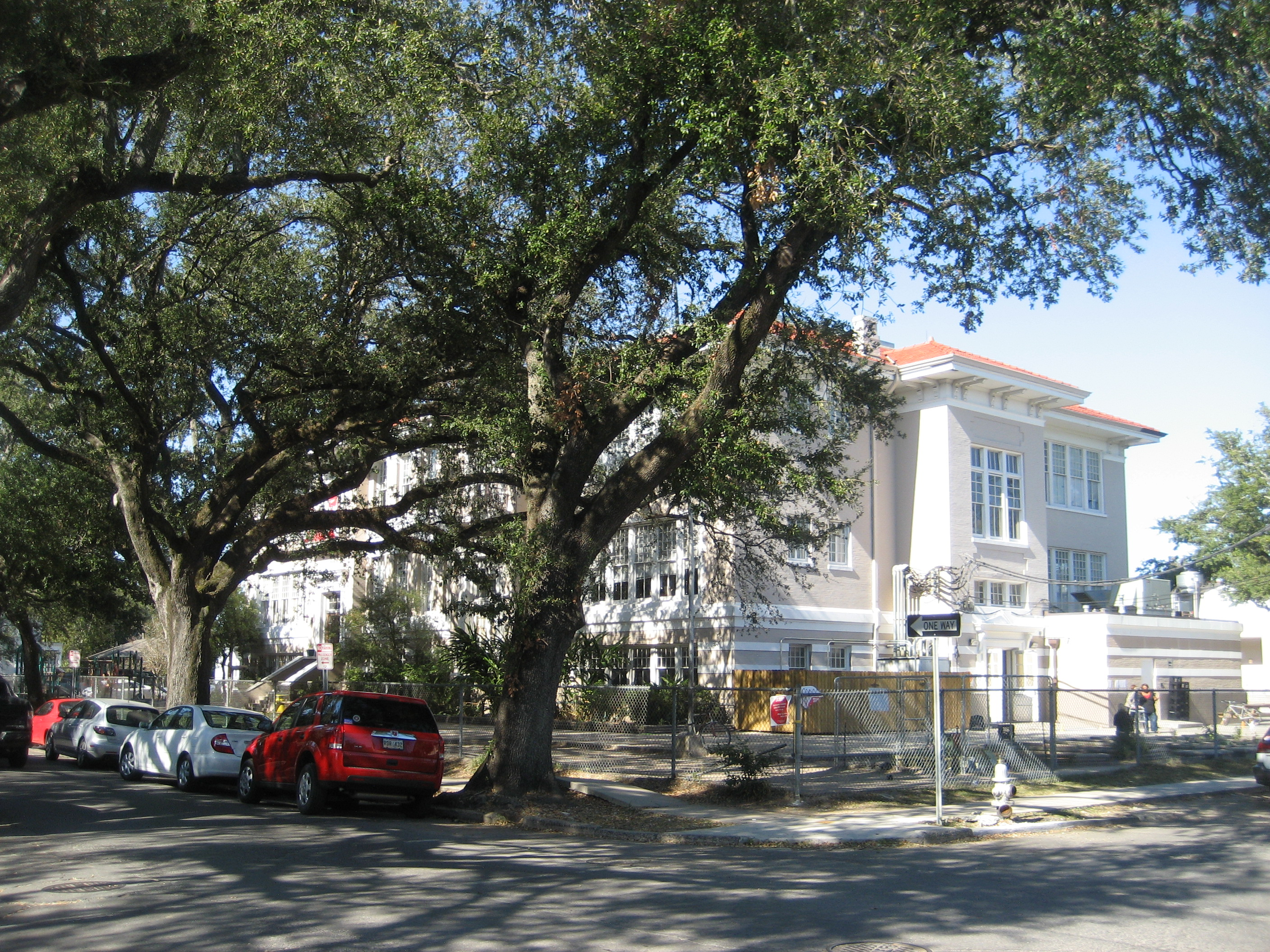
Lusher Charter School lower school campus; it has a Kindergarten-only attendance boundary covering sections of East Carrollton but it will end in 2017

Students are able to attend Orleans Parish School Board schools.

Lusher Charter School, a K-12 public charter school, has an elementary school-only attendance boundary that includes much of East Carrollton. The Greater New Orleans Collaborative of Charter Schools director, Ken Ducote, stated that this boundary may have been established after public schools in New Orleans were desegregated. The attendance boundary was preserved because parents and employees voted to make Lusher a charter school just prior to the hurricane's arrival. All of the other New Orleans schools lost their attendance boundaries after Katrina hit New Orleans. In the post-Katrina period the attendance area, previously economically mixed, became wealthier. On September 10, 2015, the Orleans Parish School Board voted to end Lusher's attendance boundary effective fall 2017.

== See also ==
- New Orleans neighborhoods
- Carrollton, Louisiana
