= Emile Lamm =

American inventor (1834–1873)

Emile Lamm (24 November 1834 – 12 July 1873, in New Orleans) was a French-born American inventor and dentist.

Lamm was born in Aÿ, France, but moved to Louisiana in 1848 at the age of 14. He patented various improvements in techniques of gold dental fillings, and developed a number of innovative designs for street railways. These later were inspired by wishes to improve the Streetcars in New Orleans, as there was a desire for faster and more powerful propulsion than horsecars could provide, while steam locomotives created noise, smoke, and soot that was undesirable in city streets. The most successful of Lamm's designs was "Lamm's Fireless Engine", which ran on the St. Charles Streetcar Line in New Orleans in the 1870s and 1880s, and also saw wide use in the street railways of Paris.

== Biography ==
Émile Lamm was born in Aÿ, Marne, France. After emigrating to the United States in 1848, he registered various patents in the field of dental medicine and turned his attention to improving the operation[3] of the tramway locomotives of the city of New Orleans in Louisiana.

He died accidentally in Mandeville, Louisiana, on July 12, 1873.
