= Fontainebleau, New Orleans =

Fontainebleau
- New Orleans Neighborhood
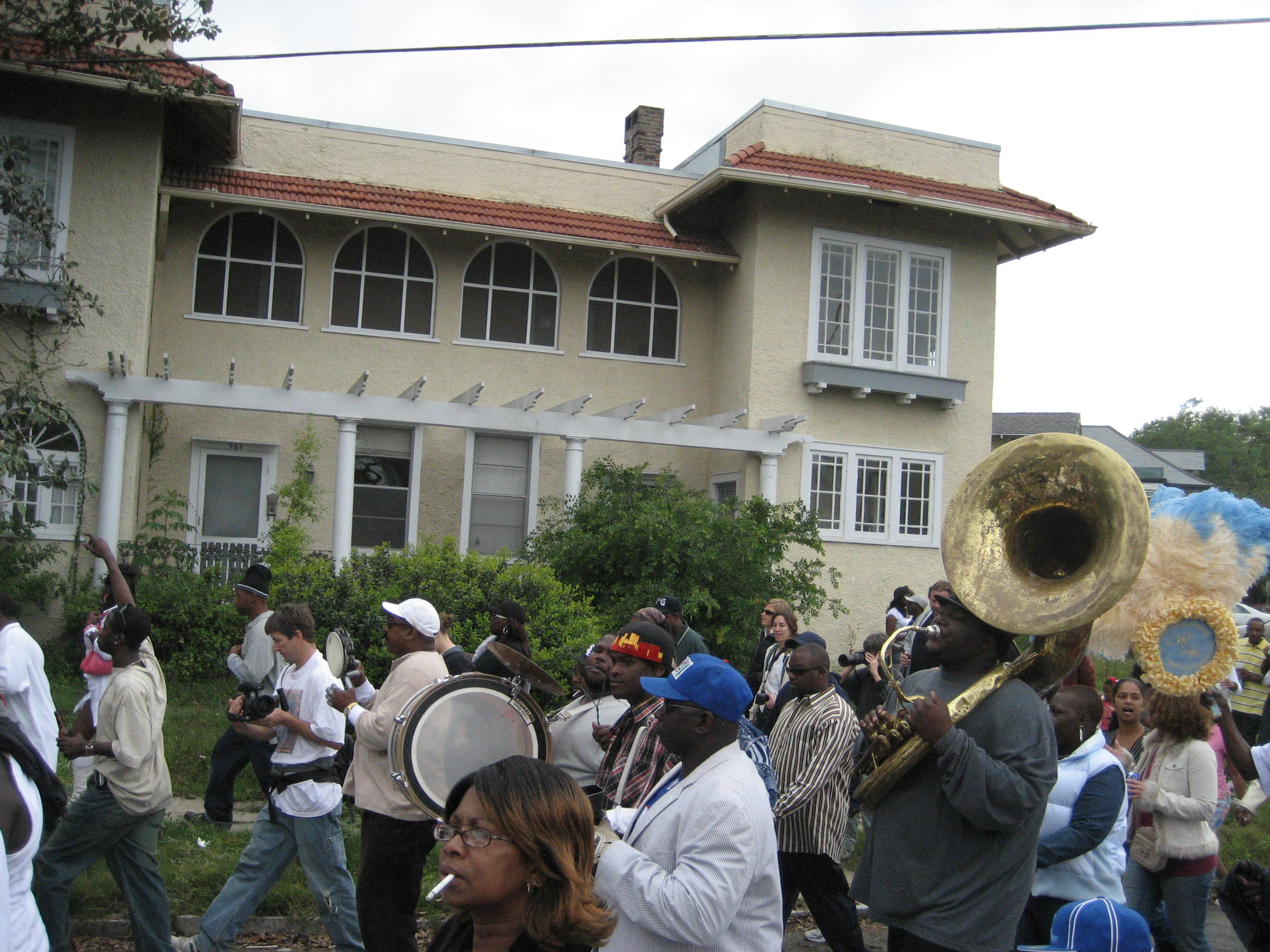
- A second line parade on Fontainebleau Drive
- Nickname: Marlyville
- Interactive map of Fontainebleau
- Coordinates: 29°57′09″N 90°06′46″W
- Country: United States
- State: Louisiana
- City: New Orleans
- Planning District: District 3, Uptown/Carrollton

Area
  - Total: 0.63 sq mi (1.6 km^{2})
  - Land: 0.63 sq mi (1.6 km^{2})
  - Water: 0.00 sq mi (0 km^{2})
- Elevation: 0 ft (0 m)

Population (2010)
  - Total: 2,792
  - Density: 4,400/sq mi (1,700/km^{2})
- Time zone: UTC-6 (CST)
  - Summer (DST): UTC-5 (CDT)
- Area code: 504

Fontainebleau and Marlyville are jointly designated as a neighborhood of the city of New Orleans. A subdistrict of the Uptown/Carrollton Area, its boundaries as defined by the New Orleans City Planning Commission are: Colapissa and Broadway Streets and MLK Boulevard to the north, Norman C. Francis Parkway, Octavia Street, Fontainebleau Drive, Nashville Avenue, South Rocheblave, Robert and South Tonti Street and Jefferson Avenue to the east, South Claiborne Avenue, Lowerline and Spruce Streets to the south and South Carrollton Avenue to the west.

== Geography ==
Fontainebleau is located at 29°57′09″N 90°06′46″W and has an elevation of 0 feet (0.0 m). According to the United States Census Bureau, the district has a total area of 0.63 square miles (1.6 km^{2}). 0.63 square miles (1.6 km^{2}) of which is land and 0.00 square miles (0.0 km^{2}) (0.0%) of which is water.

=== Adjacent Neighborhoods ===
- Gert Town (north)
- Broadmoor (east)
- Audubon (south)
- East Carrollton (south)
- Leonidas (west)

=== Boundaries ===
The New Orleans City Planning Commission defines the boundaries of Fontainebleau as these streets: Collapissa Street, Broadway Street, MLK Boulevard, Norman C. Francis Parkway, Octavia Street, Fontainebleau Drive, Nashville Avenue, South Rocheblave Street, Robert Street, South Tonti Street, Jefferson Avenue, South Claiborne Avenue, Lowerline Street, Spruce Street and South Carrollton Avenue.

== Demographics ==
As of the census of 2000, there were 6,740 people, 2,845 households, and 1,414 families living in the neighborhood. The population density was 10,698 /mi^{2} (3,965 /km^{2}).

As of the census of 2010, there were 5,749 people, 2,443 households, and 1,218 families living in the neighborhood.

== See also ==
- New Orleans neighborhoods
- Marlyville Neighborhood on Nextdoor
