= Streetcars in New Orleans =

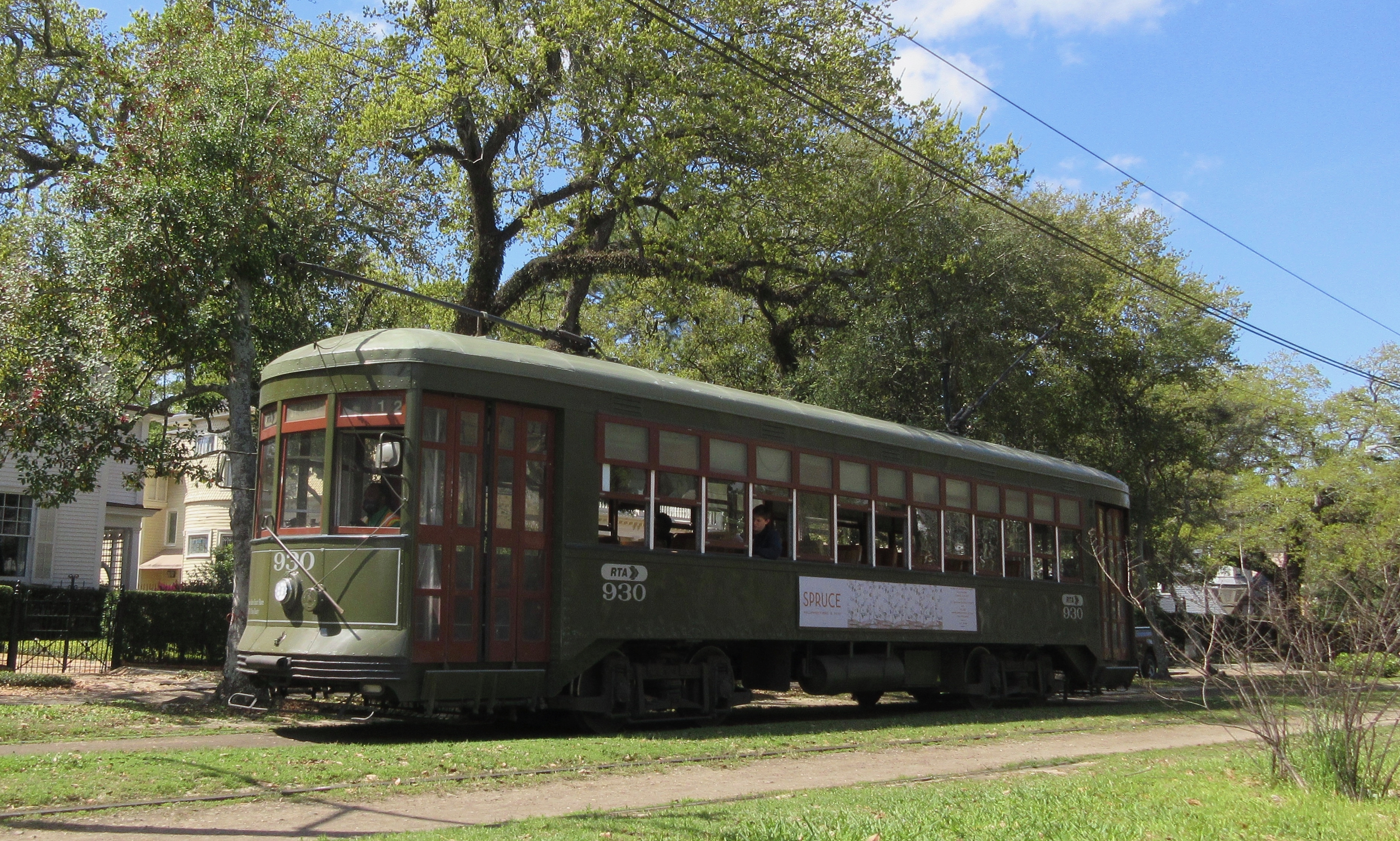
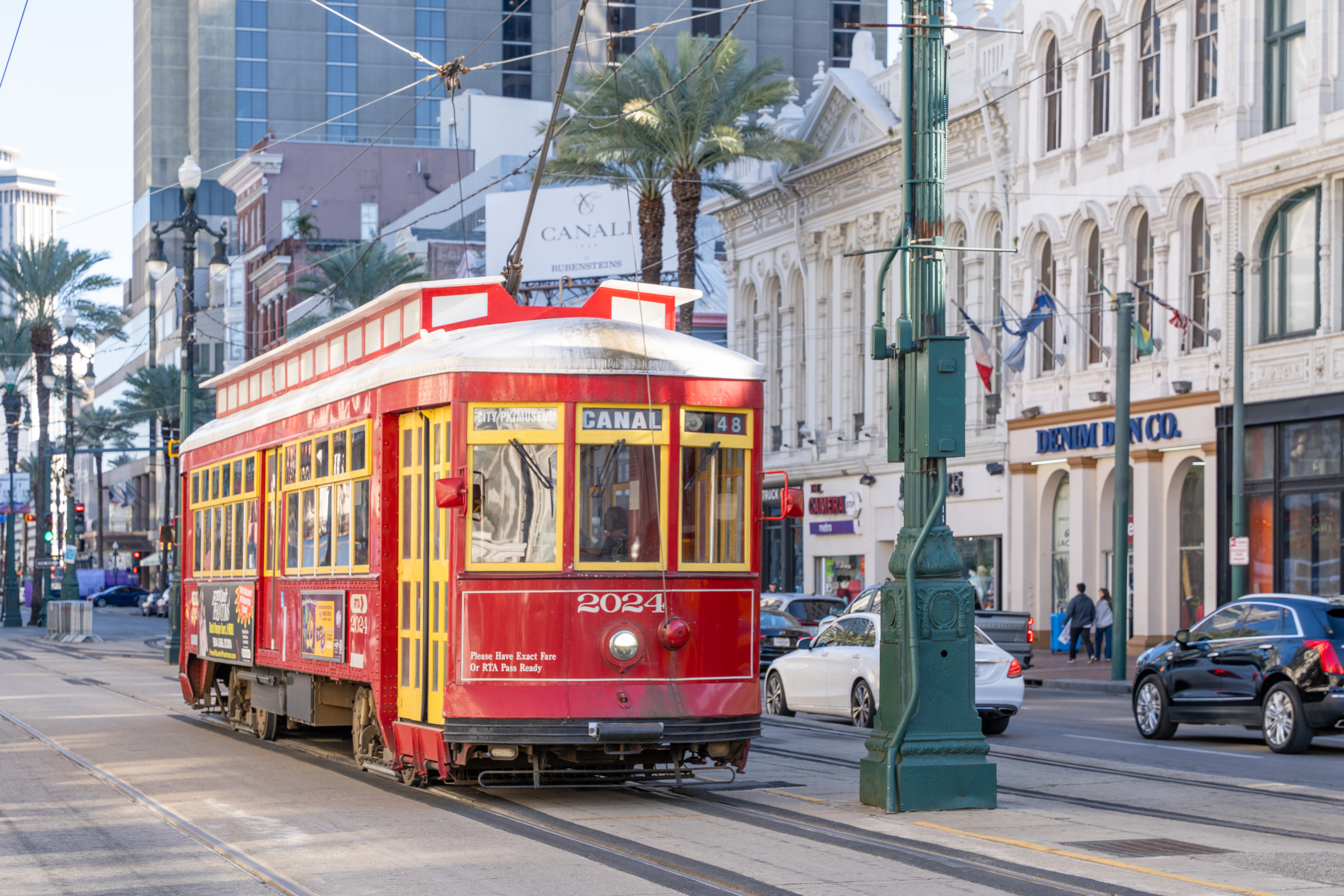
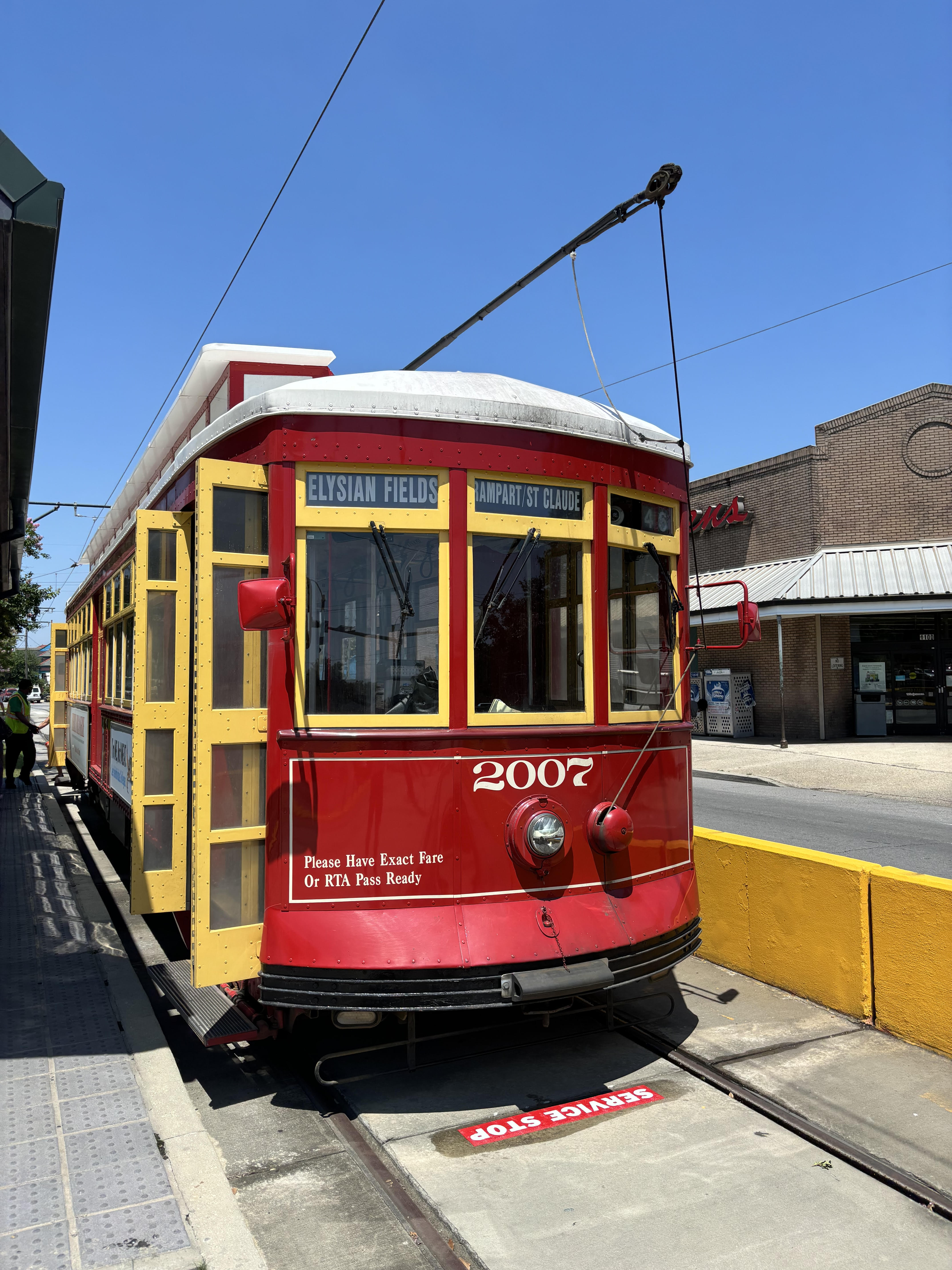
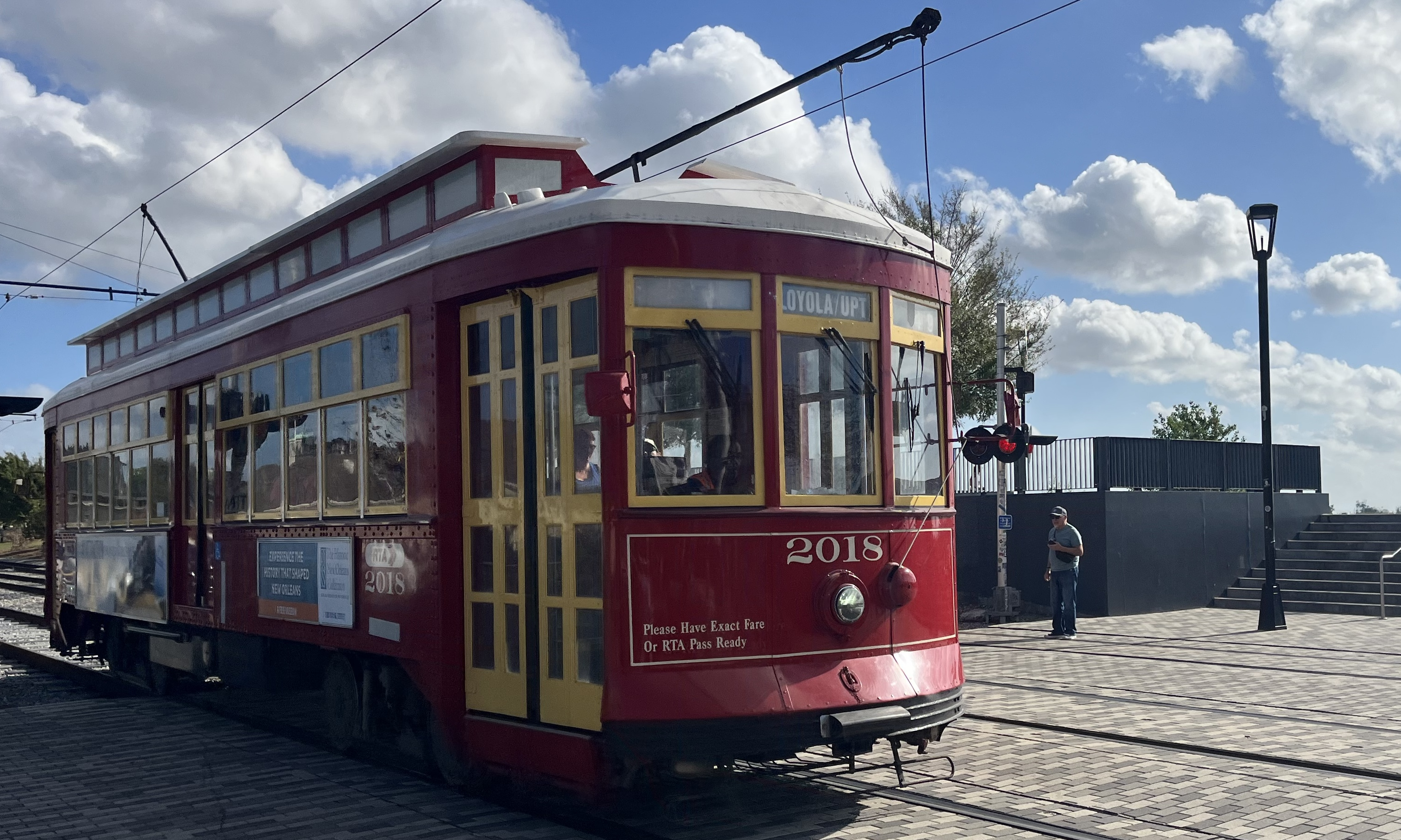
- St. Charles Canal Rampart–Loyola Riverfront

Operation
- Locale: New Orleans, Louisiana
- Open: September 1835 (steam locomotives and horsecars); February 1893 (electric streetcars/trams)
- Lines: 5 operating
- Operator: New Orleans Regional Transit Authority (RTA)

Infrastructure
- Track gauge: 5 ft 2 1/2 in (1,588 mm)
- Minimum curve radius: 28 ft (8.534 m) in yard, 50 ft (15.24 m) elsewhere
- Electrification: Overhead line, 600 V DC

Statistics
- Track length (total): 15.9 mi (25.6 km)
- Annual ridership (2025): 3,136,500
Overview

Streetcars have been part of the public transportation network of New Orleans since the first half of the 19th century. The longest of the city's streetcar lines, the St. Charles Avenue line, is the oldest continuously operating street railway system in the world. Today, the streetcars are operated by the New Orleans Regional Transit Authority (RTA).

New Orleans currently has five operating streetcar lines: St. Charles, Riverfront, Canal (with two branches), and Rampart–Loyola. The St. Charles Avenue Line is the only line that has operated continuously throughout New Orleans' streetcar history (though service was interrupted after Hurricane Katrina in August 2005 and resumed only in part in December 2006, as noted below), All other lines were replaced by bus service between the late 1940s and early 1960s. Preservationists were unable to save streetcar service on Canal Street, but succeeded in securing historic landmark protection for the St. Charles Avenue Line.

Interest in rail transit revived in the late 20th century. The newly constructed Riverfront Line began service in 1988, and streetcar service returned to Canal Street in 2004, forty years after it had been discontinued. A new line on Loyola Avenue opened in 2013 and was extended onto Rampart Street in 2016.

In 2025, the streetcar system had a ridership of 3,136,500, or about 10,400 per weekday as of the second quarter of 2026.

== History ==
=== Beginnings ===
On April 23, 1831, the Pontchartrain Railroad Company (PRR) established the first rail service in New Orleans along a five-mile (8.0 km) line running north on Elysian Fields Avenue from the Mississippi River toward Lake Pontchartrain. These first trains, however, were pulled by horses because the engines had not yet arrived from England. The PRR received its first working steam engine the next year, and first put it into service on September 27, 1832. Service continued in a mixed fashion, running sometimes with locomotives, and at other times with horse traction. A round trip fare at that time was seventy-five cents.

Those first operations included inter-city and suburban railroad lines, and horse-drawn or mule-drawn omnibus lines. The first lines of city rail service were created by the New Orleans and Carrollton Railroad, which in 1835 opened three lines. In the first week of January, the company opened its Poydras-Magazine horse-drawn line on its namesake streets (Poydras Street and Magazine Street), the first true street railway line in the city. New York City was the only place to precede New Orleans with street railway service. Then a horse-drawn line to the suburb of Lafayette, which was centered on Jackson Avenue, opened on January 13. In September, the New Orleans and Carrollton started operating its third line, a steam-powered line along present-day St. Charles Avenue, then called Nayades, connecting the city with the suburb of Carrollton, and terminating near the present-day intersection of St. Charles Avenue and Carrollton Avenue. The Poydras-Magazine line ceased operation in March or April 1836, about the time that a new La Course Street line was opened along that street (now named Race Street). That line ended in the 1840s, but the Lafayette and Carrollton lines continued, eventually becoming the Jackson and St. Charles streetcar lines.

As the area upriver (uptown) from the city began to be built up—much of the new development along the Nayades (St. Charles Avenue) corridor—additional lines were created by the New Orleans and Carrollton. On February 4, 1850, branch lines were opened on Louisiana and Napoleon Avenues. Like the Jackson line, these were horse- or mule-drawn cars, operating from Nayades Avenue to the river along their namesake streets. The Louisiana line was lightly patronized, and was discontinued in 1878. The Napoleon line continued into the next century.

Up until about 1860, omnibus lines provided the only public transit outside the area serviced by the New Orleans and Carrollton Railroad. The need was felt for a true citywide street railway service. Toward this end, the New Orleans City RR was chartered on June 15, 1860. The first line, Rampart and Esplanade (later called simply Esplanade), opened June 1, 1861, followed in quick succession by the Magazine, Camp and Prytania (later called Prytania), Canal, Rampart and Dauphine (later Dauphine), and finally Bayou Bridge and City Park. Despite the beginnings of war, the company opened and continued service on its new lines. A few other efforts were attempted during the Civil War, but progress resumed soon after the war's end.

In 1866, several additional street railway companies made their appearance in New Orleans. The first was the Magazine Street Railroad Company, which soon merged with the second, the Crescent City Railroad Co. The St. Charles Street Railroad Company was next, followed in 1867 by the Canal and Claiborne Streets Railroad Company and in 1868 by the Orleans Railroad Company. The horsecar lines of these companies covered different parts of the city, overlapping in some areas. The City RR even operated a steam railroad to Lake Pontchartrain, the West End line, which eventually became part of the city streetcar system.

=== Desegregation protests ===
Streetcars in New Orleans had been segregated since they were introduced. A few separate cars marked with stars were designated for black people — the so-called "star car" system.

In April 1867, William Nichols got onto a white-only car and was forced out. In the following weeks, thousands of African Americans engaged in protests and some riots broke out. Fearing the repetition of violence seen in previous years, the city, by May 8, desegregated the streetcar system. The chief of police told his officers: “Have no interference with negroes riding in cars of any kind. No passenger, has a right to eject any other passenger, no matter what his color.”

The streetcar system remained integrated until 1902.

=== Horsecar companies and lines operated ===
In the late 1800s, several streetcar companies operated various lines throughout New Orleans:

The New Orleans and Carrollton Railroad Company operated the Carrollton, Jackson, Louisiana, and Napoleon lines.

The New Orleans City Railroad Company managed a larger network that included the Esplanade, Canal, Magazine, Prytania, Dauphine, Bayou Bridge and City Park, Barracks and Slaughter House, French Market, Levee and Barracks, and West End lines.

The Crescent City Railroad Company operated the Annunciation, Coliseum, South Peters, and Tchoupitoulas lines.

The St. Charles Street Railroad Company ran the Clio, Carondelet, and Dryades lines.

The Canal and Claiborne Streets Railroad Company operated the Claiborne (North), Tulane, and Girod and Poydras lines.

The Orleans Railroad Company operated the Bayou St. John, Broad, City Park, and French Market lines.

=== The coming of electrification ===
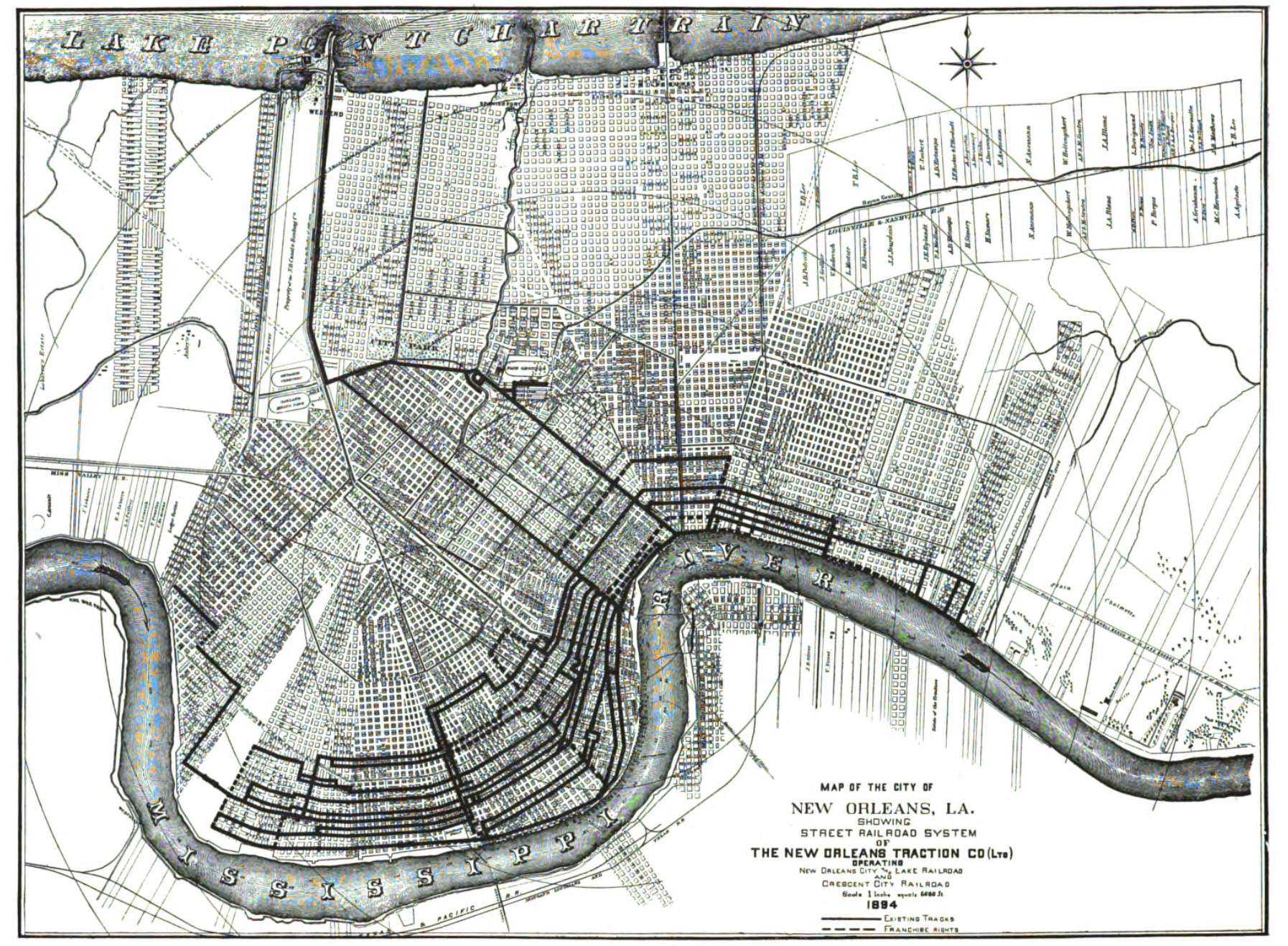
New Orleans Traction Company c. 1894

A number of experiments were tried out over the next few decades in an attempt to find a better method than horses or mules for propulsion of streetcars. These included an overhead cable car system (an underground cable, such as was eventually developed in San Francisco, was impossible because of the high water table under New Orleans); a walking beam system; pneumatic propulsion; an ammonia locomotive; a "Thermo-specific" system using super-heated water; and the Lamm Fireless engine. Lamm engines were actually adopted and used for a time on the New Orleans and Carrollton line, which had previously used steam locomotives. That line gradually gave up steam locomotives because of the objections of residents along the line to the smoke, soot, and noise. The area between the town of Carrollton and the City of New Orleans was sparsely populated with large swaths of agricultural land when the line was laid out in the 1830s; by the latter 19th century it was almost completely urbanized. Carrollton was annexed to New Orleans in 1874. Due to this increased urbanization, horsecars were used on the entire line.

Electrical propulsion of streetcars finally won out over all the other experimental methods. Electric powered streetcars made their first appearance in New Orleans on the Carrollton line on February 1, 1893. The line was also extended out Carrollton Avenue and renamed St. Charles.

Other companies followed suit. Over the next few years, almost all the streetcar lines of all six companies were electrified, including the West End steam line; the few lines that remained animal powered, such as the Girod and Poydras, were discontinued. Also, operations of the six companies began to be consolidated at this time, beginning with formation of the New Orleans Traction Company, which took over operation of the New Orleans City and Lake RR (an 1883 renaming of the New Orleans City RR) and the Crescent City RR in 1892. New Orleans Traction became the New Orleans City RR in 1899, the second company to use that name. The Canal and Claiborne company was merged into the New Orleans and Carrollton in 1899. Then in 1902, New Orleans Railways Company took over operation of all city streetcars, and in 1905 the operating company became New Orleans Railway and Light Company Final consolidation of ownership as well as operation finally became reality in 1922 with the formation of New Orleans Public Service Incorporated (commonly abbreviated NOPSI, never NOPS).

=== Electric streetcars under consolidated operation ===
Labor problems began to occupy the attention of street railway officials as consolidation progressed. At first, each of the street railway companies had its own agreement with its operating personnel. New Orleans Railways tried to maintain those separate agreements, but labor representatives insisted on one agreement for the entire company. They also demanded an increase in pay and recognition of their union, Division 194 of the Amalgamated Association of Street and Electric Railway Employees of America. The union struck on September 27, 1902. After about two weeks of strife, a settlement was reached, and in early 1903, the company signed a contract and recognized the union.

In 1902, there were protests when the Louisiana legislature mandated that public transportation must enforce racial segregation. At first this was objected to by both white and black riders as an inconvenience, and by the streetcar companies on grounds of both added expense and the difficulties of determining the racial background of some New Orleanians.

Consolidation of operations under a single company had the advantage of untangling and rationalizing some streetcar lines. As an extreme example, consider the Coliseum line, which had the nickname Snake Line, because it wandered all over uptown New Orleans. Its early name Canal and Coliseum and Upper Magazine gives an idea of the route. Under consolidation, Coliseum was pretty much limited to service on its namesake street, with trackage on upper Magazine Street turned over to the Magazine line, as one might expect. Other efficiencies were instituted, such as reducing the number of streetcar lines operating over long stretches of Canal Street.

There was another strike beginning July 1, 1920. This one was settled around the end of July with a new contract.

In the early 1920s, several extensions and rearrangements of service resulted in the inauguration of the famous Desire line, the Freret line, the Gentilly line, and the St. Claude line.

In 1929, there was a widespread strike by transit workers demanding better pay, which was widely supported by much of the public. Sandwiches on baguettes were given to the "poor boys" on strike, said to be the origin of the local name of "po' boy" sandwiches. There was much rioting and animosity. Several streetcars were burned, and several people were killed. Service was gradually restored, with the strike ending in October.

The same year, the last of the 4 ft 8 1/2 in (1,435 mm) standard gauge tracks were converted to 5 ft 2 1/2 in (1,588 mm) (Pennsylvania trolley gauge) to match the rest of the streetcar lines.

Buses began to be used in New Orleans transit in 1924. Several streetcar lines were converted to bus or were abandoned outright over the next 15 years. Beginning after World War II, as in much of the United States, almost all streetcar lines were replaced with buses, either internal combustion (gasoline/diesel) or electric (trolley bus). See the Historic Lines section below. Track and overhead wire of abandoned or converted lines were generally removed, although remnants of abandoned track remain in a few places around the city.

The last four streetcar lines in New Orleans were the S. Claiborne and Napoleon lines, which were converted to motor bus in 1953; the Canal, which was converted in 1964; and the St. Charles, which has continued in operation, and now has historic landmark status.

Racial segregation on streetcars and buses in New Orleans was finally ended peacefully in 1958. Until then, signs separating the races were carried on the backs of the seats in streetcars and buses. These signs could be moved forward or back in the vehicle as passenger loads changed during the operating day. Under court order, the signs were simply removed, and passengers were allowed to sit wherever they pleased.

In 1974, the Amalgamated won a representation election and formed Local Division 1560 in New Orleans. Negotiations between the union and NOPSI were unsuccessful, and a strike followed. In December 1974, a contract was signed between NOPSI and Local 1560, but the strike was not completely settled until the following March.

=== Streetcars under RTA ===
In the late 1970s and early 1980s, it became apparent that private operation of the New Orleans transit system could not continue. Creation of a public body that could receive tax money and qualify for federal funding was necessary. The Louisiana legislature created the New Orleans Regional Transit Authority (RTA) in 1979, and in 1983, RTA took over ownership and operation of the system.

In 1988, a new Riverfront line was created, using private right of way along the river levee. This was the first new streetcar line in New Orleans since 1926. Then in 2004, the Canal line was reconstructed and restored to rail operation. An all-new line on Loyola Avenue was opened in 2013. It was extended across Canal Street on Rampart Street and St. Claude Avenue in 2016 in a short form of the historic St. Claude streetcar line. See the Current Lines and Future Network Expansion sections below.

=== Hurricane Katrina ===
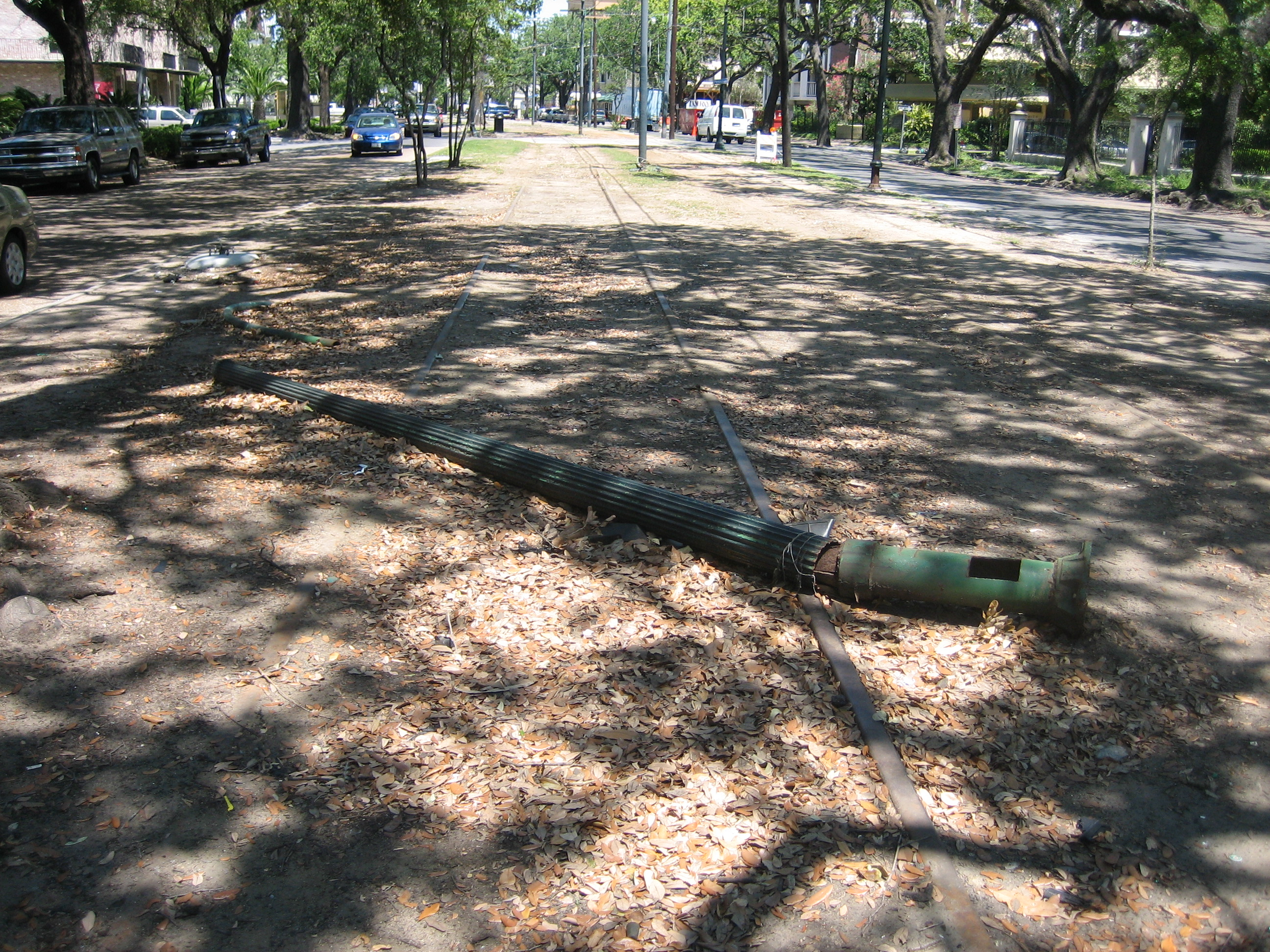
Fallen pole across St. Charles streetcar tracks.

The area through which the St. Charles Avenue Line traveled fared comparatively well in Hurricane Katrina's devastating impact on New Orleans at the end of August 2005, with moderate flooding only of the two ends of the line at Claiborne Avenue and at Canal Street. However, wind damage and falling trees took out many sections of trolley wire along St. Charles Avenue, and vehicles parked on the neutral ground (traffic medians) over the inactive tracks degraded parts of the right-of-way. At the start of October 2005, as this part of town started being repopulated, bus service began running on the St. Charles line.

The section running from Canal Street to Lee Circle via Carondelet Street and St. Charles Street in the Central Business District was restored December 19, 2006 at 10:30 a.m. Central time. Service from Lee Circle to Napoleon Avenue in uptown New Orleans was restored November 10, 2007 at 2:00 p.m. RTA restored streetcar service on the rest of St. Charles Ave. on December 23, 2007. Service along the remainder of the line on Carrollton Avenue to Claiborne Avenue resumed June 22, 2008. The time was needed to repair the damage caused by Hurricane Katrina and to perform other maintenance and upgrades to the lines that had been scheduled before the hurricane. Leaving the line shut down and the electrical system de-energized allowed the upgrades to be performed more safely and easily.

Perhaps more serious was the effect on the system's rolling stock. The vintage green streetcars rode out the storm in the sealed barn in a portion of Old Carrollton that did not flood, and were undamaged. However, the newer red cars (with the exception of one which was in Carrollton for repair work at the time) were in a different barn that unfortunately did flood, and all of them were rendered inoperable; early estimates were that each car would cost between $800,000 and $1,000,000 to restore. In December 2006, RTA received a $46 million grant to help pay for the car restoration efforts. The first restored cars were to be placed in service early in 2009.

Service on the Canal Street Line was restored in December 2005, with several historic St. Charles line green cars transferred to serve there while the flood-damaged red cars were being repaired. The eventual reopening of all lines was made a major priority for the city as it rebuilt.

Brookville Equipment Corporation (BEC) of Pennsylvania was awarded the contract to provide the components to rebuild 31 New Orleans' streetcars to help the city bring its transportation infrastructure closer to full capacity. The streetcars were submerged in over five feet of water while parked in their car barn, and all electrical components affected by the flooding had to be replaced. BEC's engineering and drafting departments immediately began work on this three-year project to return these New Orleans icons to service. The trucks for the cars were remanufactured by BEC with upgraded drives from Saminco and new control systems from TMV Control Systems. Painting, body work, and final assembly of the restored streetcars was carried out by RTA craftsmen at Carrollton Station Shops. As of March 2009, sufficient red cars had been repaired to take over all service on the Canal Street and Riverfront lines. As of June 2009, the last three Canal Street cars were scheduled for repair. The seven Riverfront cars were worked on next; they began to return to service in early 2010.

== Current lines ==
- 12 St. Charles runs from Canal Street along St. Charles Avenue and South Carrollton Avenue to its terminal at Carrollton and Claiborne. It is the oldest continuously operating streetcar line in the world, having opened in 1835.
- 46 Rampart–Loyola runs from the Union Passenger Terminal along Loyola Avenue to Canal Street, then along Rampart Street and Saint Claude Avenue to Elysian Fields Avenue. The line opened in October 2016 following completion of the French Quarter Rail Expansion, which added 1.5 mi (2.4 km) of track and six stops. Service was suspended between October 2019 and May 2024 after the collapse of the Hard Rock Hotel at Canal and Rampart.
- 47 Canal/Cemeteries runs the length of Canal Street, from near the Mississippi River to the cemeteries at City Park Avenue. The line originally operated from 1861 to 1964 and was rebuilt and reopened in 2004. A short extension opened in January 2018 added a new Cemeteries terminal with improved transfers to connecting bus routes.
- 48 Canal/City Park runs along Canal Street from near the Mississippi River to North Carrollton Avenue, terminating at City Park near the New Orleans Museum of Art at Esplanade Avenue.
- 49 Riverfront runs parallel to the Mississippi River from Esplanade Avenue in the French Quarter past Canal Street to the Convention Center near Julia Street. The line opened on October 14, 1988. Service to the Poydras and Julia Street stops was suspended from 2018 to 2025.

== Future network expansion ==
RTA has plans to extend the Rampart-St. Claude line past its present terminal at St. Claude and Elysian Fields to Press Street, and also down Elysian Fields to the river to connect with the Riverfront line. These plans are not funded, and are on hold as more urgent needs are considered for funding.

There was a proposal, along with the general redevelopment of Claiborne Avenue, to build a streetcar line on N. Claiborne Avenue running from Poydras Street to Elysian Fields. However, it appears this proposal was never seriously considered and is unlikely to be fulfilled.

== Current rolling stock ==
The St. Charles Line operates with historic vehicles built between 1923 and 1924 by the Perley A. Thomas Car Works of High Point, North Carolina. A total of 73 cars were built, of which 35 are required for current operations. These 900 series cars are part of the line's designation as a National Historic Landmark and therefore cannot be heavily modified, preventing them from being equipped with wheelchair lifts. In addition, one car built in 1896 by the J. G. Brill Co. to the Ford, Bacon & Davis design remains operational, although it no longer carries passenger seats, and is occasionally used for maintenance duties and special events.

With the introduction of the Riverfront and Canal Street lines, the RTA required additional vehicles. Two series of modern streetcars, designed to resemble the historic Perley Thomas cars, were built in-house by the RTA. Seven cars, designated the 457 series, were completed in 1997 for the Riverfront line. A second group, known as the 2000 series, was constructed beginning with a single car in 1999 and followed by 23 more between 2002 and 2003 for the restored Canal Street line. The trucks for the 2002–2003 vehicles were manufactured by Brookville Equipment Corporation. These red-painted streetcars are accessible to passengers with disabilities and, in the case of the 2000-series, equipped with air conditioning.

The historic green streetcars used on the St. Charles Avenue Line are maintained and stored at Carrollton Station in the Carrollton neighborhood. The block-wide facility consists of two buildings: an older car barn at Dante and Jeannette streets and a newer barn at Willow and Dublin streets. The shop at Carrollton Station is capable of fabricating replacement parts for the vintage Perley Thomas cars. The newer red streetcars are stored and receive routine maintenance at the A. Philip Randolph Operations Facility, which also serves as the headquarters of the RTA; major repairs on these cars are carried out at Carrollton Station.

In late 2020, the RTA retrofitted three modern streetcars, numbers 460 through 462, to provide accessibility for passengers with disabilities on the St. Charles line. A fourth car, number 463, was later modified as well. By 2026, the remainder of the 457-463 series have also been modified for St. Charles service. These cars were repainted in the traditional green livery of the historic 900-series fleet to match the appearance of the Perley Thomas streetcars.

Image	Model	Manufacturer	Built	Number built	Seats
	900 series	Perley A. Thomas Car Works	1923‍–‍1924	73	52
	457 series	New Orleans Regional Transit Authority	1997	7	40
	2000 series	New Orleans Regional Transit Authority	1999, 2002‍–‍2003	24	40
	#29	J. G. Brill Co. to the Ford, Bacon & Davis design	1896	1	None

== Historic lines ==
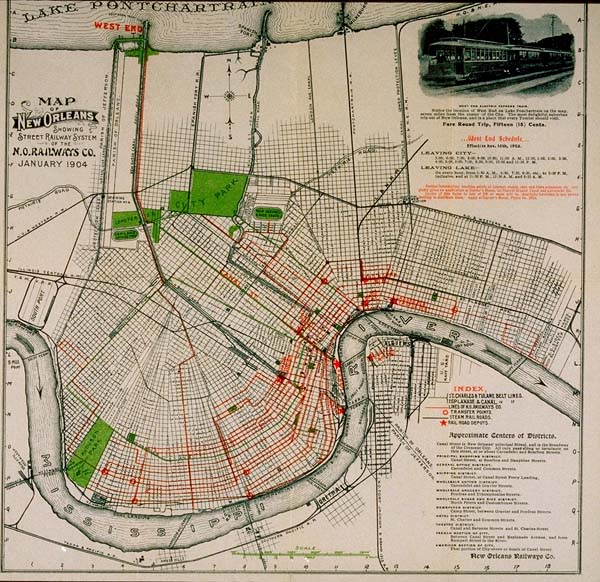
Map of New Orleans Showing Street Railway System of the New Orleans Railways Company, January 1904.

In the mid 19th to early 20th century, the city had dozens of lines, including:

- Poydras-Magazine (January 1835 – March/April 1836) – Though short-lived, this was the first true streetcar line to begin operation in New Orleans, having opened the first week of January 1835.
- Jackson (January 13, 1835 – May 19, 1947) – This long-running line also opened before the St. Charles line, on January 13, 1835. Replaced with trolley bus and later diesel bus service.
- Louisiana (February 4, 1850 – 1878, August 27, 1913 – December 27, 1934) – The original 1850–1878 Louisiana Line was a branch line of the New Orleans & Carrollton, running on Louisiana from St. Charles to the river at Tchoupitoulas. The later 1913–1934 line ran from Canal Street up to Louisiana Ave. on Freret and Howard (now LaSalle) Streets, then to Tchoupitoulas. For part of its life, it terminated on Canal Street at the ferry landing.
- Napoleon (February 4, 1850 – February 18, 1953) – Like the Louisiana Line, the original Napoleon Ave. line was a branch line of the New Orleans & Carrollton, running on Napoleon from St. Charles Ave. to the river at Tchoupitoulas. Unlike the Louisiana, it was extended to Canal Street when electrified in 1893. A second line, popularly known as the Royal Blue Line, was opened on January 1, 1903 from St. Charles out to the end of the Avenue at Broad Street. The two were combined in 1906. With the Shrewsbury Extension on Metairie Road, which operated from 1915–1934, this was the longest streetcar line in New Orleans. Its routing was as follows: on Napoleon Avenue from Tchoupitoulas to S. Broad, then turning right onto S. Broad, left onto Washington Ave. (running between the street and the Palmetto-Washington drainage canal), right onto S. Carrollton Avenue, left onto Pontchartrain Boulevard (this would now be impossible due to the presence of the Pontchartrain Expressway / I-10), left onto Metairie Road, then zig-zagging through several Old Metairie streets to a terminus at Cypress and Shrewsbury Road (now Severn Avenue).

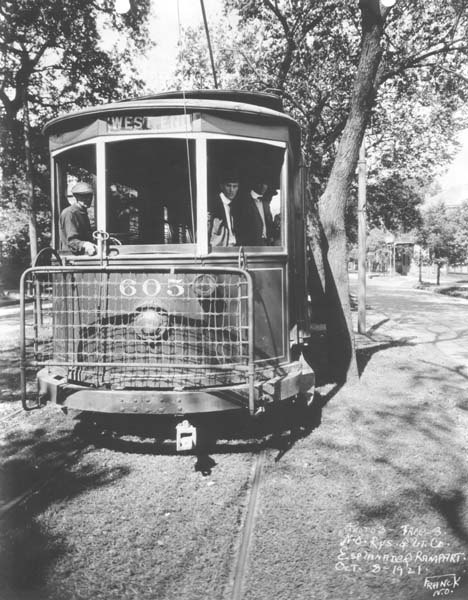
Streetcar on Esplanade Avenue, 1921.

- Esplanade (June 1, 1861 – December 27, 1934) – This was the first streetcar line to traverse the "back-of-town" section of New Orleans, running all the way out Esplanade Ave. to Bayou St. John in its original routing. From 1901–1934 the Canal and Esplanade lines operated in a loop as the Canal-Esplanade Belt, until Esplanade Ave. went to buses in 1934.
- Coliseum (originally Canal and Coliseum and Upper Magazine) (September 1, 1881 – May 11, 1929) – Known as the "Snake Line" because its course in uptown New Orleans was particularly curved. Originally operating on Coliseum Street from Canal to Louisiana, it was extended piece by piece over the years, first on Magazine to the present Audubon Park, then through the park to Broadway and then across to Carrollton Ave., where it connected to the loop on Oak and Willow Streets from Carrollton to the Orleans-Jefferson parish line. Beginning in 1913, however, the Magazine Line took over all trackage on Magazine Street, and a shorter Coliseum Line ended near Audubon Park.
- Magazine (June 8, 1861 – February 11, 1948) – Its longest routing, in the 1910s, took it all the way from Canal Street, up Magazine and Broadway to S. Claiborne Avenue Replaced with trolley bus and later diesel bus service.

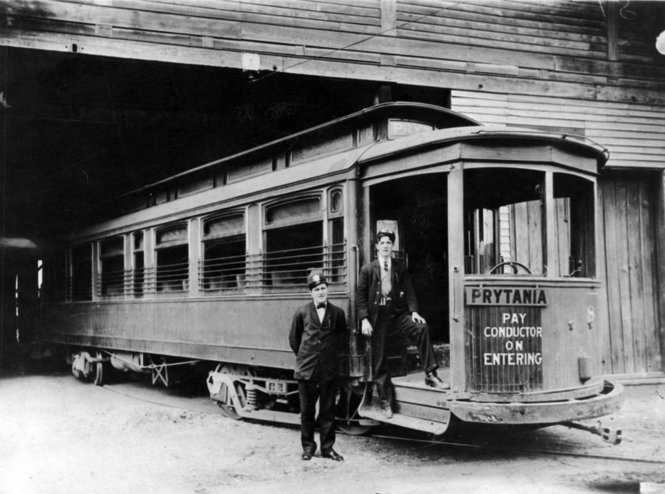
Prytania line streetcar, probably at Prytania Station carbarn, 1907.

- Prytania (June 8, 1861 – October 1, 1932) – Known as the "Silk Stocking Line", Prytania ran through the Garden District on its namesake street.
- Bayou Bridge and City Park (mid-1861 – December 22, 1894, route absorbed into Esplanade line) – This early line ran the full length of the present-day City Park Avenue (then called Metairie Road).
- Tchoupitoulas (August 10, 1866 – July 2, 1929) – This early riverfront line once ran the full-length of Tchoupitoulas Street from Canal Street to Audubon Park.
- N. Claiborne (May 13, 1868 – December 27, 1934) – This was a downtown (i.e., downriver) line. From 1917 to 1925, it was operated as a single line with the Jackson Line.
- Tulane (originally Canal & Common) (January 15, 1871 – January 8, 1951) – From 1900–1951 the St. Charles and Tulane lines operated in a loop as the St. Charles-Tulane Belt, taking passengers past the beautiful homes on St. Charles Avenue, up S. Carrollton Avenue past the St. Charles Line's present terminal at S. Claiborne Avenue, across the New Basin Canal (now the site of the Pontchartrain Expressway), turning at the former Pelican Stadium onto Tulane Avenue and back downtown. The Tulane Avenue service became a trolley bus and later a diesel bus route.
- Broad (originally Canal, Dumaine & Fair Grounds) (1874 – July 16, 1932) – After 1915, the Broad Line had two branches, on St. Bernard and Paris Avenues.

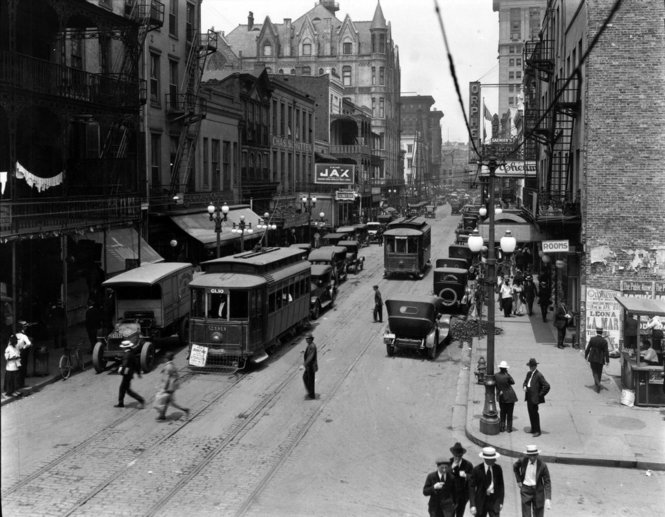
A Clio line streetcar in St. Charles Street, New Orleans Central Business District, 1920.

- Clio (January 23, 1867 - September 1, 1932) - This line originally ran from Canal Street up St. Charles Street and over to Clio Street to Magnolia Street, returning on Erato and Carondelet Streets. In 1874, it was extended across Canal Street to Elysian Fields, making it the first streetcar line to cross Canal Street. It was extended at both ends from time to time, before giving up its territory to newer lines in 1932.
- Carondelet (July 29, 1866 - September 7, 1924) - This uptown line ran on its namesake street from Canal Street to Napoleon Ave. At its most extensive, it also ran on Freret Street from Napoleon to Broadway, on trackage that eventually became part of the Freret line, and it crossed Canal Street into the French Quarter, pioneering the route of the later Desire line.
- Annunciation (February 27, 1867 - December 23, 1917) and Laurel (August 12, 1913 - July 5, 1939) - These were uptown lines near the river, running on Annunciation and Chippewa Streets, and on Laurel and Constance Streets.
- West End (April 20, 1876 – January 15, 1950) – This line is still fondly remembered for its jaunty ride through the grassy right-of-way along the New Basin Canal (now filled in) to the popular West End area on Lake Pontchartrain.
- Spanish Fort (March 26, 1911 – October 16, 1932) – Further east along Lake Pontchartrain at the mouth of Bayou St. John was another amusement area built around an old fort. This was the original location of Pontchartrain Beach before it moved further east to Elysian Fields Ave. The Spanish Fort Line branched off of the West End Line at what is now Allen Toussaint Boulevard.
- S. Claiborne (February 22, 1915 – January 5, 1953) – In its later years, this line operated at the edges of the neutral ground, which covered a large drainage canal, part of which was open. The part of the neutral ground that was covered was planted in grass and ornamental trees and bushes, and was quite beautiful. Replaced by diesel bus service.
- Desire (October 17, 1920 – May 29, 1948) – This line ran through the French Quarter down to its namesake street in the Bywater district. It was immortalized in Tennessee Williams' play A Streetcar Named Desire. The line was converted to buses in 1948. Various proposals to revive a streetcar line with this name have been discussed in recent years, but the New Orleans Regional Transit Authority has no current plans to rebuild. Enthusiasts are nicknaming the new St. Claude line the "Desire line", despite the former and latter each having run on separate and distinct routes. For many years, a 1906 Brill-built semi-convertible streetcar was displayed in the French Market with a Desire route sign, although there is no evidence that cars of this type ever served the Desire Line. At first it was under cover; later out in the open, it deteriorated from the weather, and in the 1990s it was turned over to New Orleans RTA. It is currently housed at Carrollton Station in the car shops.
- Freret (September 7, 1924 – December 1, 1946) – Created from trackage formerly part of the Carondelet line. Replaced with trolley bus and later diesel bus service.
- St. Claude (February 21, 1926 – January 1, 1949) – This and the Gentilly Line were the last two streetcar lines to open in New Orleans until the August 1988 inauguration of the Riverfront line. Replaced with trolley bus and later diesel bus service. The New Orleans Regional Transit Authority has plans to rebuild a similar route.
- Gentilly (February 21, 1926 – July 17, 1948) – Gentilly was derived from the old Villere Line. It was unusual in being named for the neighborhood it served, rather than the street along which it ran. At one end, it traversed the French Quarter. Then it turned up Almonaster (now Franklin) to its outer terminal at Dreux. Replaced by diesel bus service, which was eventually renamed Franklin for the street.
- Orleans/Kenner interurban (or O.K. Line) – This line operated between 1915 and 1931 and connected New Orleans to Kenner. It began at the intersection of Rampart and Canal in New Orleans and followed the Tulane streetcar line to the intersection of S. Carrollton with S. Claiborne, then proceeded along the route of the present-day Jefferson Hwy. through Jefferson Parish to the St. Charles Parish Line in an area then known as Hanson City (now part of Kenner). This line was not a NOPSI service, although it came under NOPSI control in the late 1920s.
- Loyola–Riverfront (January 28, 2013 – May 30, 2025) This line ran along Loyola Avenue from Union Passenger Terminal to Canal Street. It originally continued along Canal Street before running parallel to the riverfront to the French Market. Weekend service extensions to the French Market later became daily following the 2019 Hard Rock Hotel collapse, which blocked access to Canal Street and subsequently affected nearby riverfront stops during construction of the Four Seasons Hotel. The line was later renamed Loyola–UPT and then Loyola–Riverfront in 2024 after partial restoration of service.

== Preserved streetcars ==
In addition to the 35 Perley Thomas-built 900-series streetcars that serve the St. Charles line, the following New Orleans streetcars have been preserved in various ways.

- Preserved in New Orleans

453: The last of the 25 Brill semi-convertible cars. It was on display at the French Market and later at the Mint, but exposure to the weather caused its deterioration. It is known in posed pictures as the Streetcar Named Desire, although there is no evidence that this class of streetcar ever ran on the Desire line. It is currently stored inoperative at Carrollton Station, but it could be restored for operation.

919 and 924: These two Perley Thomas cars, originally twins to the 35 900-series cars running on the St. Charles line, were sold in 1964 when the Canal line was discontinued. They were bought back by RTA in 1985 and refurbished for service on the Riverfront line, beginning August 14, 1988. They were given Riverfront car numbers 451 and 450, respectively. They were again retired in 1997 when the Riverfront line was re-equipped with new cars 457-463. They are currently stored inoperative at Carrollton Station, but they could be restored for operation.

957: When the Canal line was discontinued in 1964, this car was sold to the Trinity Valley Railroad Club in Weatherford, Texas, west of Fort Worth. Then it was sold to the Spaghetti Warehouse Company, then to the McKinney Avenue Transit Authority in Dallas, Texas, and finally it was purchased by New Orleans RTA in 1986. It was stored until 1997, when it was rebuilt with a wheelchair lift and modern controls, becoming the first of the new 457-463 series cars for the re-equipment of the Riverfront line.

- Preserved for revenue operation in San Francisco

952: This Perley Thomas car was sold in 1964 when the Canal line was discontinued, and was bought back by RTA in 1990 and refurbished for service on the Riverfront line. As number 456, it served Riverfront until 1997. After its second retirement, it was rebuilt in the same manner as the 35 St. Charles line cars, given its original number, and sent on long-term loan to the San Francisco Municipal Railway, where it operates on that city's E Embarcadero and F Market & Wharves lines as part of the Heritage Fleet.

913: This car was sold to the Orange Empire Railway Museum in Riverside County, California in 1964 when the Canal line was discontinued. Later, it was sold to San Francisco Municipal Railway to augment service there by car 952. So far, it has not been refurbished for service, but is stored for future use.

- Preserved at museums and heritage operations

832: At Pennsylvania Trolley Museum at Washington, Pennsylvania.
836: At Connecticut Trolley Museum at East Windsor, Connecticut.
850: At Shore Line Trolley Museum at Branford, Connecticut.
These are the last three 800-series cars in existence. All were built by Perley Thomas in 1922. The museums have restored all three to like-new condition, and operate them on museum property.

918: Now at North Carolina Transportation Museum, Spencer, NC, intended for cosmetic restoration. For a time, it was stored at Thomas Built Buses, the current name of its builder, Perley Thomas Car Co.

966: Owned by Seashore Trolley Museum, Kennebunkport, Maine, and operated at Lowell National Historical Park, Massachusetts.
