= St. Charles Avenue =

Thoroughfare in New Orleans, United States

Coordinates: 29.9291°N 90.1007°W

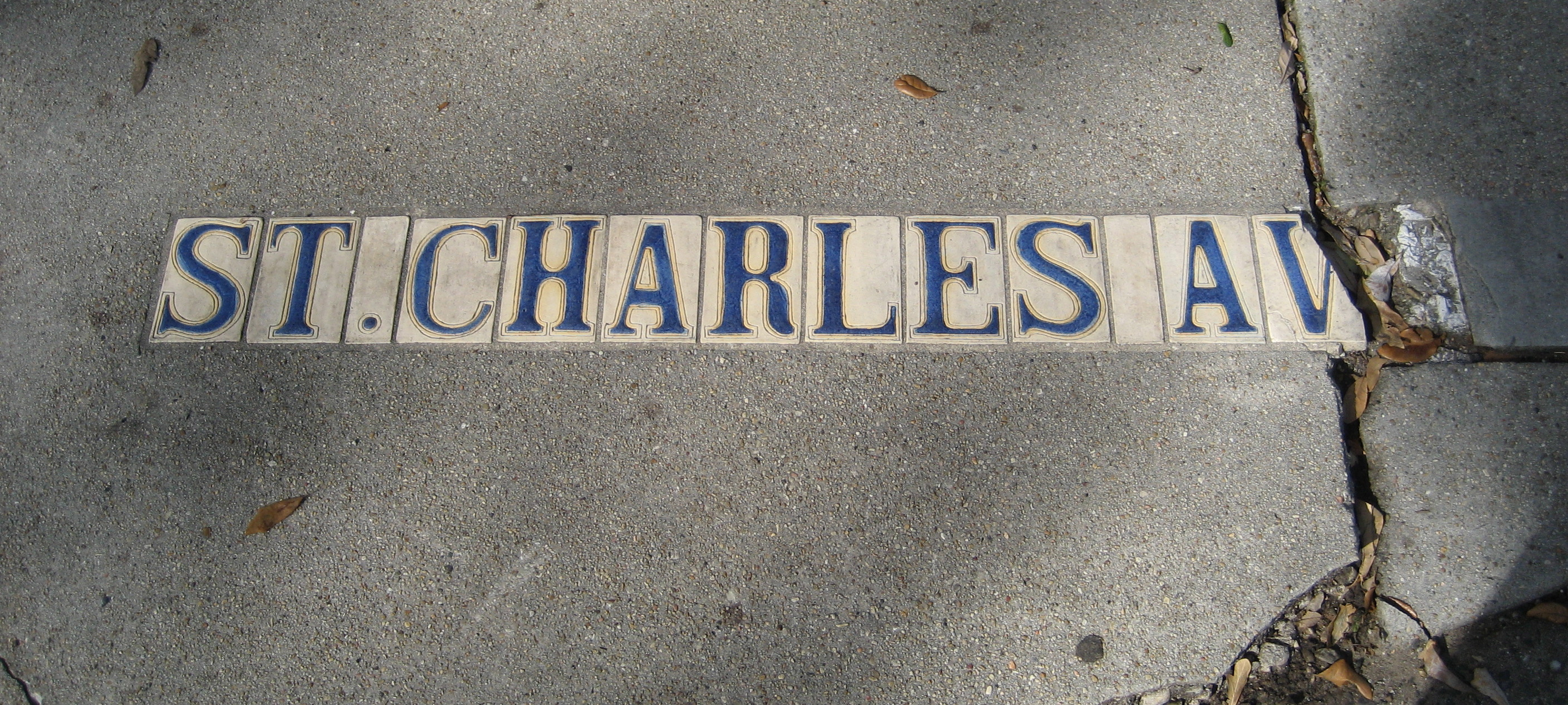
19th century street-name tiles in sidewalk

St. Charles Avenue (French: avenue Saint-Charles) is a thoroughfare in New Orleans, Louisiana, U.S. and the route of the St. Charles Streetcar Line. It is also famous for the dozens of mansions that adorn the tree-lined boulevard for much of the uptown section of the boulevard. It is named for St. Charles Borromeo, patron saint of Charles III of Spain, the monarch when France transferred the then-vast territory of Louisiana to Spain at the conclusion of the Seven Years' War in 1763.

The southern live oak trees, plentiful in the historic Garden District, were planted during the early twentieth century. Similar additions were made on other major New Orleans streets, such as Carrollton Avenue, Napoleon Avenue, and part of Canal Street, becoming one of the city's most memorable features.

St. Charles Avenue is one of the chief Mardi Gras parade routes.

== The street ==
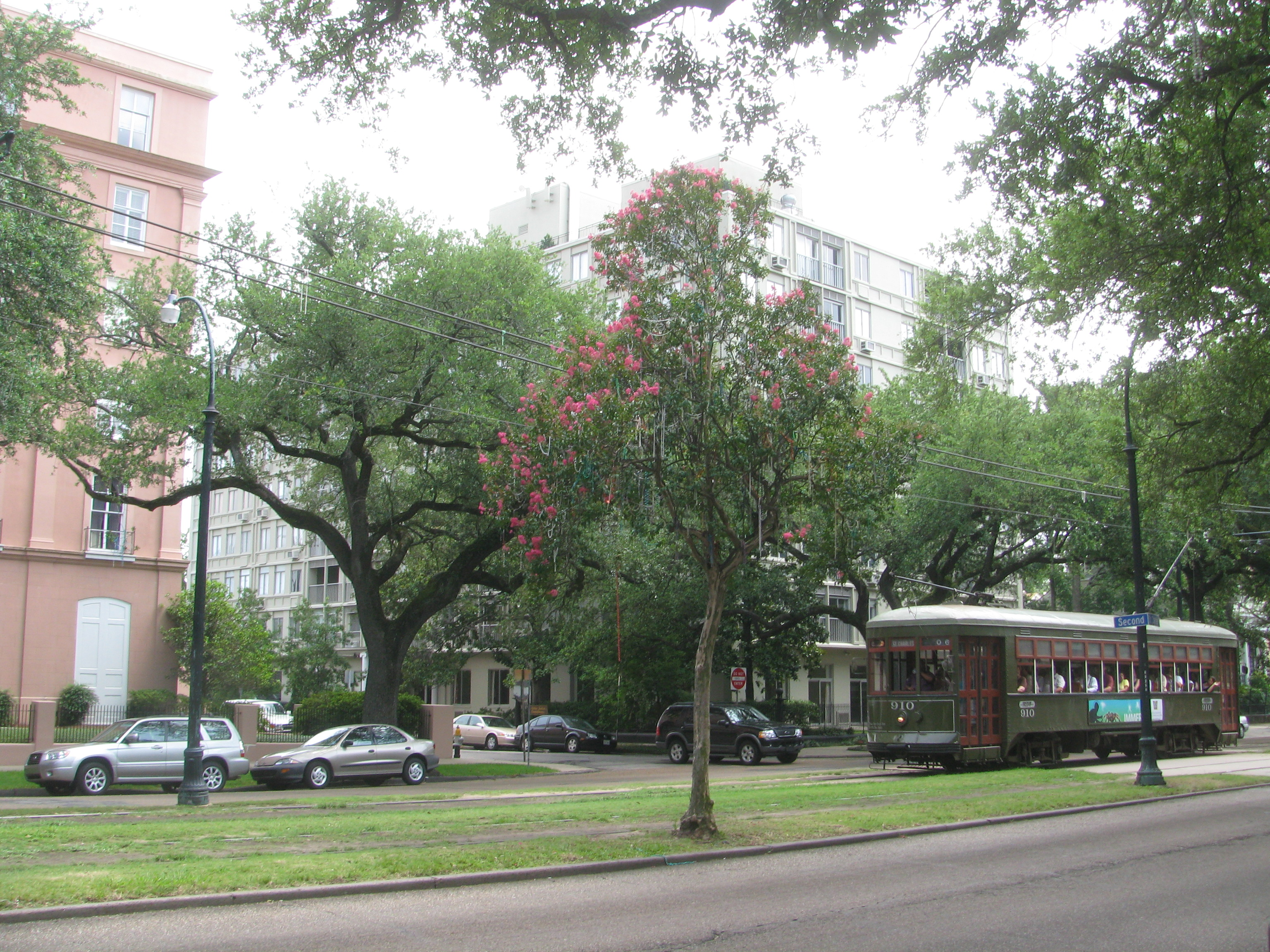
New Orleans streetcar on St. Charles Avenue in the Garden District with Mardi Gras beads on a tree in the foreground.

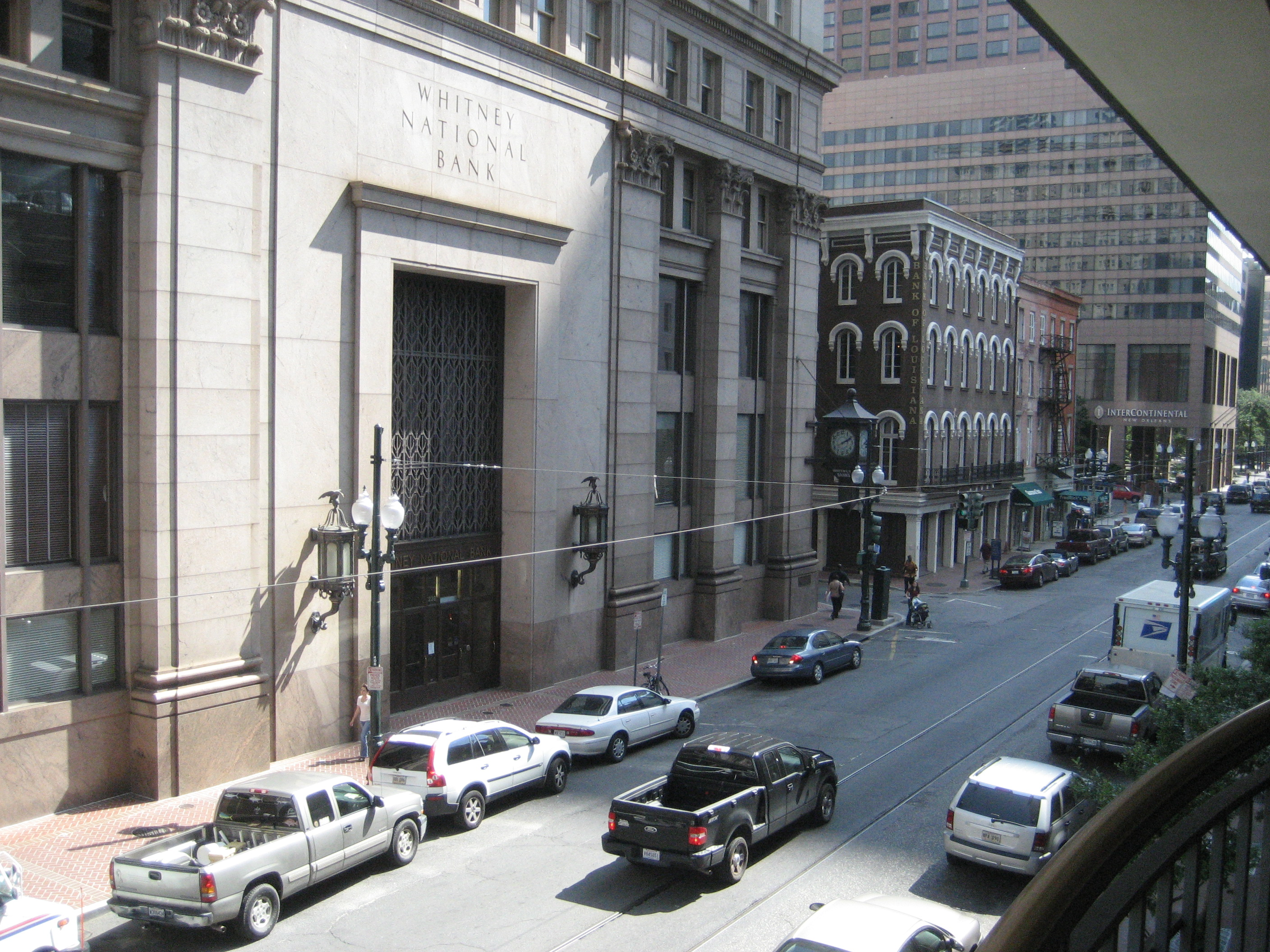
A view of St. Charles in the downtown New Orleans Central Business District

The "downriver" end meets Canal Street. On the other side of Canal Street in the French Quarter, the corresponding street is Royal Street. From Canal Street, St. Charles runs up through the New Orleans Central Business District, then the length of Uptown New Orleans, reflecting the crescent curve of the Mississippi River but at a distance inland. It continues to the Carrollton neighborhood, ending one block past Carrollton Avenue where it intersects with Leake Street/River Road at the foot of the Mississippi River levee.

From Canal Street to Lee Circle, St. Charles Avenue is properly called St. Charles Street and is one way in the upriver direction with two lanes of traffic, with the streetcar track sharing right-of-way with one lane of motor vehicle traffic. From Lee Circle to Louisiana Avenue it has two lanes of traffic in each direction with two streetcar rail lines on the grassy tree-lined median ("neutral ground" in local parlance). From Louisiana Avenue to Carrollton Avenue it has one lane of traffic in each direction plus the streetcar neutral ground. The streetcar line turns inland at Carrollton Avenue to follow the thoroughfare, while the final stretch continues the final short block to River Road.

Major intersections, from east to west, include: Canal Street, Poydras Street, Lee Circle/Howard Avenue, Martin Luther King Jr. Boulevard/Melpomene Avenue, Jackson Avenue, Washington Avenue, Louisiana Avenue, Napoleon Avenue, Jefferson Avenue, Nashville Avenue, Broadway Street, Carrollton Avenue, and Leake Avenue.

== History ==
For the first half of the 19th century, the portion of St. Charles above Lee Circle (then "Tivoli Circle") was known as Nyades Street. The lower portion was and is an important corridor in the Central Business District. Historically significant buildings include Gallier Hall, which was City Hall until the 1950s.

The street was laid out atop a slight rise, the remains of an old natural levee, in connection with the construction of the New Orleans and Carrollton Railroad, which became the St. Charles Streetcar Line. The long traffic avenue originally used for horse-drawn buggies and wagons, with public rail transit running down the center, helped fuel the development of Uptown in the 19th century.

In 1889, writer Martha R. Field observed that "St. Charles Avenue is seven miles long, and is paved with asphalt its entire length" and was lined "with beautiful homes."

St. Charles Avenue was the favored site for construction of mansions by the wealthy from the mid 19th century through the early years of the 20th century. A number of the old mansions were torn down in the mid- and late 20th century, until the area was declared an historic district. Many of the surviving ones have been divided into condominiums or rental apartments; others have been utilized as businesses, small hotels, and a library, while some remain individually-owned residences.

In early 1999, an effort by the New Orleans Police Department was made to clean up the Avenue and the blocks north, which were beginning to show signs of seediness. The illegal drug industry was pushed back into Central City.

During the 2005 flooding of the majority of New Orleans due to levee failures caused by Hurricane Katrina, St. Charles Avenue and the portion of Uptown closer to the Mississippi River escaped significant flooding.

== Prominent buildings ==
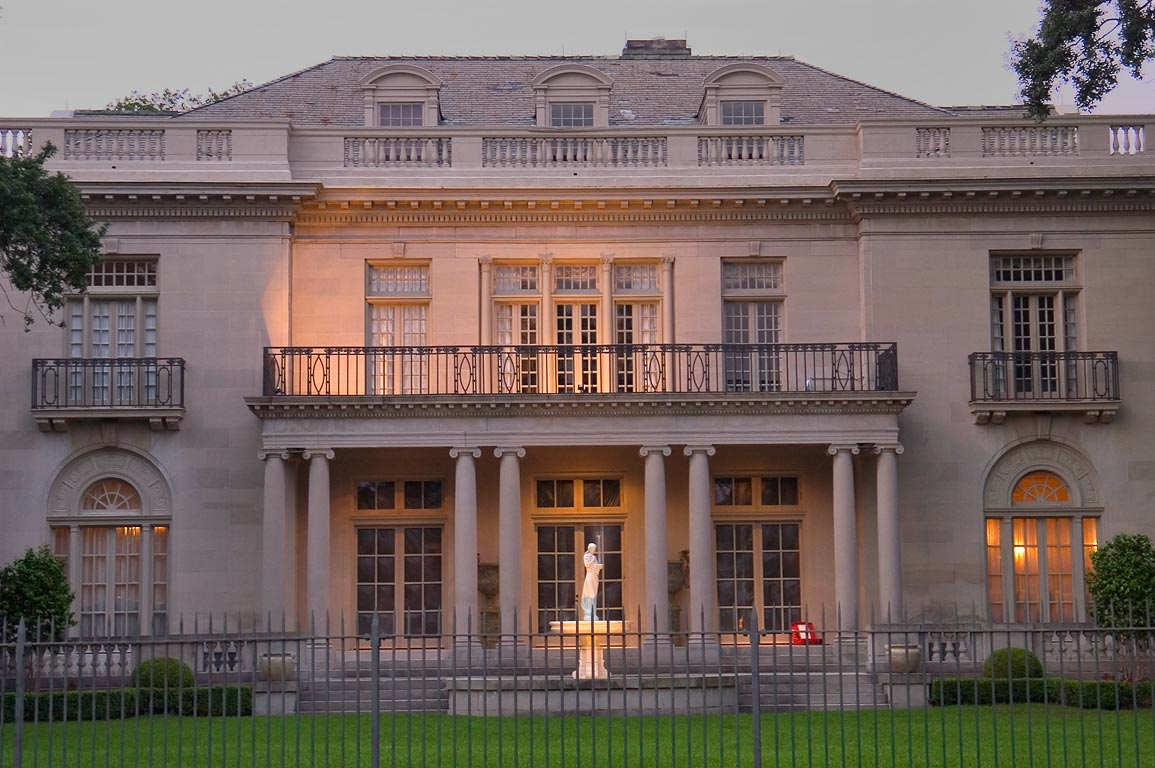
The Benjamin Mansion on St. Charles Avenue - Built in 1907

Notable buildings along St. Charles Avenue include several hotels, perhaps the most famous still in business being the Pontchartrain Hotel, in business since 1927. The Columns Hotel is a small hotel in a 19th-century mansion; part of the film Pretty Baby was made here.

The St. Charles Hotel, near Canal Street, was one of the city's two most well-known hotels through most of the 19th and early 20th centuries; it was torn down in the 1970s. (The other was the St. Louis Hotel in the French Quarter, which was replaced in the 20th century by the Royal Orleans.) The former Bienville Hotel on Lee Circle is now an apartment building.

The headquarters of the United Fruit Company was on St. Charles Avenue in the Central Business District.

The former mansion of silent-film star Marguerite Clark is now the Milton Latter Memorial branch of the New Orleans Public Library.

The facades of both Tulane University and Loyola University New Orleans are located on St. Charles Avenue, opposite Audubon Park.

== See also ==
- Buildings and architecture of New Orleans
- History of New Orleans
- List of streets of New Orleans
- Neighborhoods in New Orleans
- Streetcars in New Orleans
  - St. Charles Streetcar Line
- Uptown New Orleans
- Simon Hernsheim
