= Coleman Adler =

Founder of Adler's Jewelry, New Orleans (1868–1938)

Coleman E. Adler (1868, Slovakia – 1938, New Orleans, Louisiana) founded the historic Adler's Jewelry in New Orleans, Louisiana. Arriving in New Orleans in 1896, Adler was active in the local Progressive movement there. He belonged to the Progressive Union, Association of Commerce, Tourist and Conventions Bureau, and the Canal Street Association. He founded Coleman E. Adler Jewelry in 1898, a business that still operates on Canal Street.

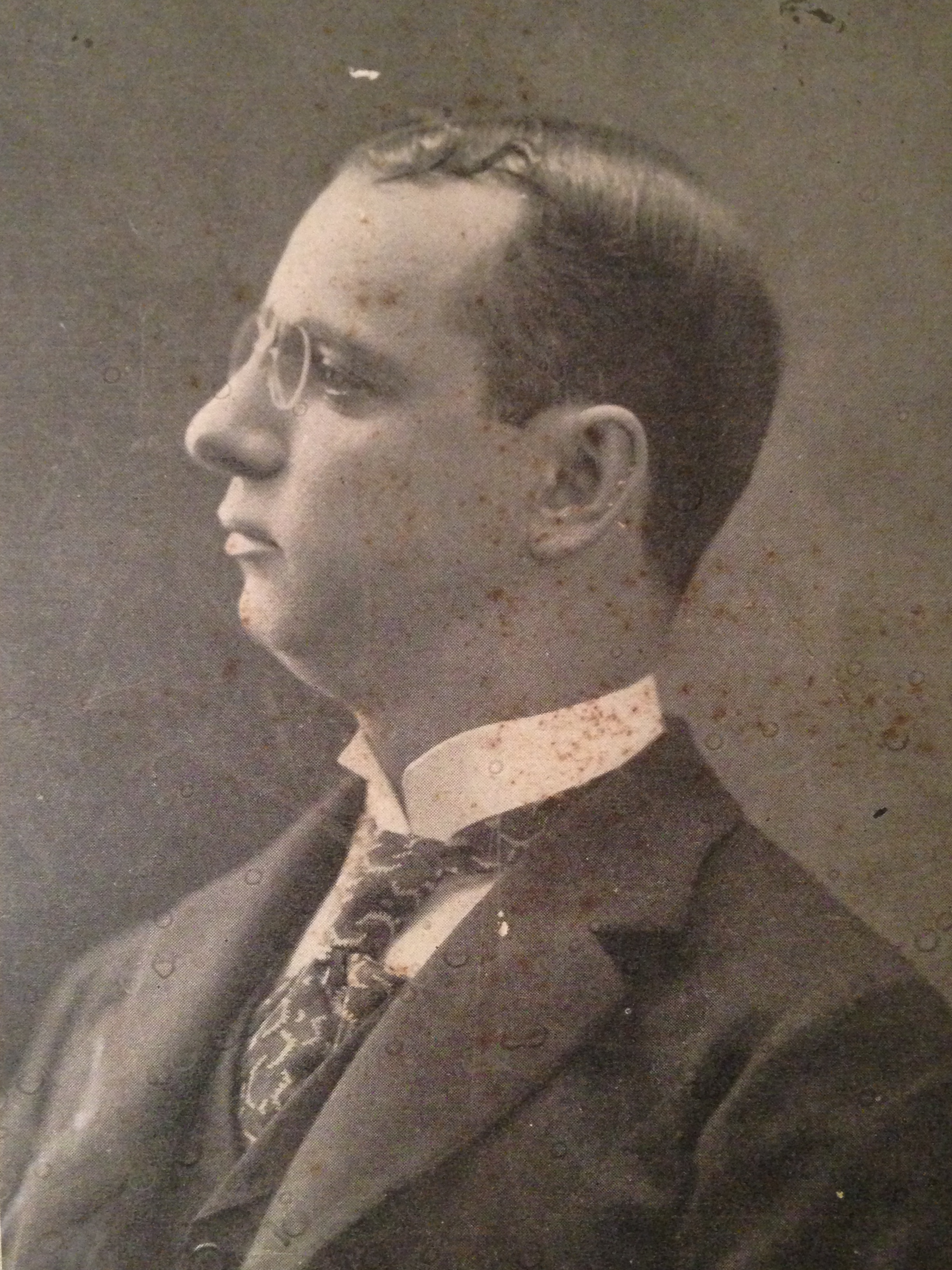
Photograph of Coleman E. Adler, circa 1899

== Early life ==
Coleman E. Adler arrived in New York as boy with his older brother Isaac in 1874. The pair settled in Alabama, where Coleman worked as an apprentice in the jewelry trade as a young man. His early career involved work as a travelling salesman for jewelry firms in New York. His travels brought him to New Orleans, where he met and married Rosa Pokorny.

Rosa was the youngest daughter of Michael and Fannie Pokorny. Originally from Moravia, the Pokornys arrived in New Orleans at the beginning of the Civil War. Michael Pokorny was a master shoemaker and eventually owned three successful shoe stores in downtown New Orleans. Over time, Michael Pokorny became one of the largest real estate owners in the city. By the 1890s, the Pokorny family was much-respected in New Orleans business, philanthropic, and social circles. Coleman and Rosa Pokorny Adler lived at the Pokorny estate at 2113 St. Charles Avenue.

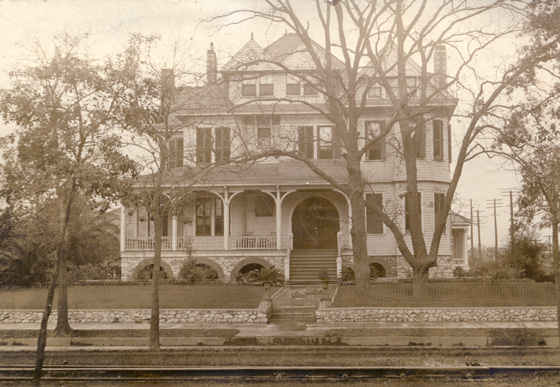
Home of Coleman and Rosa Pokorny Adler at 2113 St. Charles Avenue, circa 1908

== Civic work ==
A resident of New Orleans for 40 years, Coleman Adler worked to improve and promote his adopted hometown. The city's early growth had been stunted by the Civil War, and national economic depression in the 1870s had ravaged the New Orleans economy. The late 1800s, however, was the era of the Progressive movement, which sought to improve society by applying modern ingenuity and methods. In New Orleans, the movement energized local leaders and businessmen to tackle the city's overall decline. Coleman Adler belonged to many of the groups that actively sought to bring New Orleans into the modern era.

For many years, Adler was an active member of the Canal Street Association. In the early decades of the 20th century, this body provided reliable sanitation and modern illumination on Canal Street, New Orleans. It also repaired older buildings and helped negotiate work agreements between the city transportation system and its workers. Adler was vice chairman of the Canal Street Association when that body installed electric lighting along Canal in 1930. Thomas Edison flipped the inaugural switch on the new lights, and the New York Times ran a full-page story on the project and lighting ceremony.

In 1908, the city's Progressive Union appointed Adler to their Committee of 100. The Committee was created to increase tourism in New Orleans by “bringing tourists from the north, east, and west so that wealthy investors may see for themselves the [city’s] wonderful industrial advantages.” Adler also served on the Association of Commerce's convention committee, which was charged with increasing the number of large conventions held in the city. In 1910, Adler travelled to Washington, D.C., with a cadre of city leaders to promote New Orleans as the locale for the World Panama Canal Exhibition of 1915. When Theodore Roosevelt visited New Orleans in 1911, Adler was on the reception committee for his visit. Over the years, Coleman helped coordinate a number of important events in the city, including “Made in New Orleans Week,” a reception for the Ambassador of Italy, and the Commercial Men's Alliance convention. In 1930, Mayor T. Semmes Walmsley appointed Adler head of the city's Retail Stores Committee. During this period, Adler also served on the board of directors of the Young Men's Business League and the New Orleans Zoological Society.

== Adler's of New Orleans ==
Coleman Adler opened his own jewelry firm in 1898. The store was originally located on Royal Street in the French Quarter. In 1902, Adler's moved to 810 Canal Street, in the heart of the city's bustling retail district. In 1908, Adler's obtained its own building at 722-24 Canal Street and is still there today.

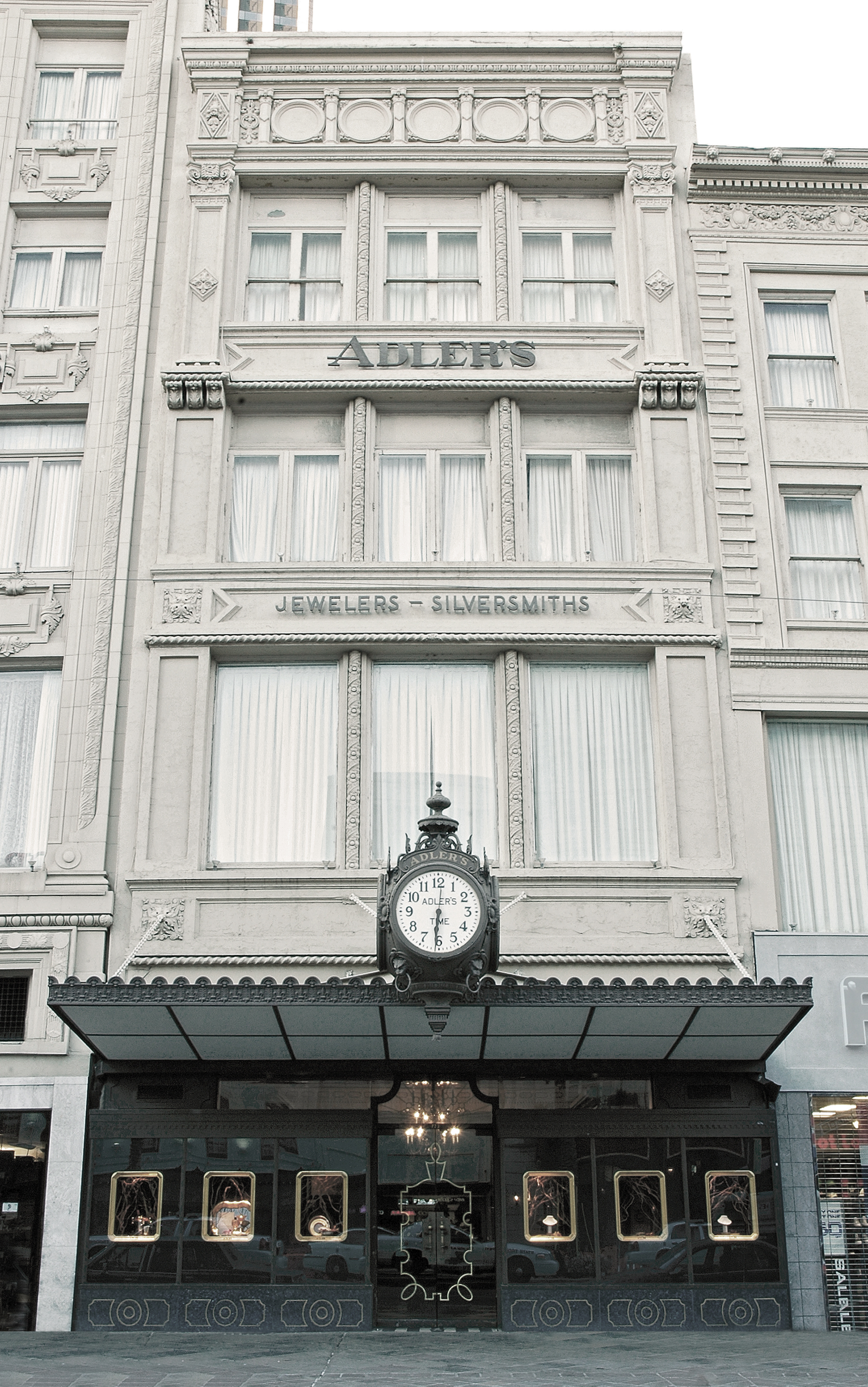
Adler's Jewelry, 722 Canal Street, New Orleans, circa 1990

Adler's quickly became a local favorite. From its earliest years, the firm has designed original pieces for the city's many Mardi Gras krewes each carnival season. Adler's has been commissioned to create pieces for many of the area's historic occasions as well. The firm created the 1904 Times-Picayune Loving Cup awarded to education pioneer Sophie B. Wright. In 1906, Adler's created a solid silver tea service that local dignitaries presented to naval crew of the U.S.S. Louisiana. The firm was commissioned to create the official Louisiana Centennial coin in 1912. Adler's designed the silver football perpetual trophy awarded in the annual Thanksgiving Day contest between Tulane University and Centenary College in the 1920s. In 2012, Adler's created the Louisiana Bicentennial coin from the original 1912 press for the Centennial coin.

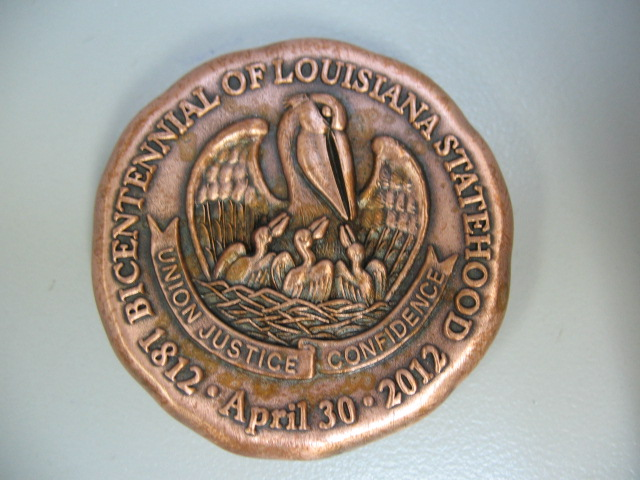
2012 Louisiana Bicentennial Coin, designed and manufactured by Adler's in New Orleans

After decades of hosting fine art and housewares exhibits, Adler's was chosen as the regional dealer for Tiffany and Co. The firm is also the exclusive local dealer of Patek Philippe, Royal Copenhagen, and Gien. Coleman E. Adler died in February, 1938. His sons Milton and Walter Adler continued their father's civic and commercial work, as do their own children and grandchildren today.

== Sources ==
National Archives Records Administration (NARA). United States Passport Applications, 1795-1925. 1922, roll 1901, certificate 144347.

Hamburger Passagierlisten, 1850 to 1934. [database – online]

United States Federal Census, 1880 to 1900.

Chattanooga, Tennessee, City Directory. 1882.

Birmingham, Alabama, City Directory. 1888 to 1890.

NARA, Southeast Region. Orders Admitting Aliens to Citizenship. ARC ID4499449, Record Group 21.

International Find-A-Grave, Memorial #114628266.

Louisiana Marriages, 1718-1925.

New Orleans, Louisiana Birth Records Index, 1790-1899. Vol. 113, p. 381.

Times-Picayune, November 6, 1898.

The Jeweler's Review. Volume XXXIII, December 6, 1899.

New Orleans, Louisiana, City Directory. 1900 to 1938.

United States Federal Census. 1900.

New Orleans Item, January 17, April 19, and June 5, 1902.

New Orleans Item, October 4, 1902.

Times-Picayune, February 2, 1903.

New Orleans Item, April 24, 1904.

Times-Picayune, May 1, 1904.

New Orleans Item, July 5, 22, and 31; September 16; November 25; and December 6, 7, 15, and 30, 1906.

Times-Picayune, July 4, and October 31, 1908.

Times-Picayune, February 13; March 15, 18, and 26; June 12; and September 10, 1909.

New Orleans Item, March 18, May 12, June 4, and August 30, 1909.

National Archives Records Administration (NARA), Southeast Region. Orders Admitting Aliens to Citizenship. ARC ID 4499444, Record Group 21.

Branley, Edward. “When Canal Street was ‘The Mall’,” GoNOLA.com. December 2, 2013.

United States, Passport Applications, 1795-1925. 1922, roll 1901, certificate 144347.

Times-Picayune, March 11, April 8, May 9, June 28, 1910.

New Orleans Item, July 6 and 21, 1910.

Times-Picayune, January 18; March 25, 10, 12; and October 19, 1911.

New Orleans Item, February 14 and 18, March 12, and November 11, 1911.

Times-Picayune, May 6, 9, and 11; July 12; August 1 and 21; October 28; and November 17, 1913.

New Orleans Item, May 7, 1913.

Times-Picayune, September 21, 1919.

Times-Picayune, November 24, 1925.

Times-Picayune, May 23, 1926.

Times-Picayune, February 23, 24, and 25; April 3; June 1 and 21; November 19 and 26, 1930.

Times-Picayune, January 11, April 2, June 1, October 28, and November 7, 1931.

Times-Picayune, November 8, 1931.

Times-Picayune, January 12, 1932.

Times-Picayune, March 3, 20, and 30; and April 1, 1935.

Times-Picayune, March 7, August 16, and November 23, 1936.

Times-Picayune, January 25 and November 15, 1937.

Obituary for Coleman E. Adler, Times-Picayune, February 28, 1938.

Times-Picayune, March 1 and 2, 1938.
