= Adler's Jewelry =

Jewelry shop in the late 1800s, founded in New Orleans

Adler's Jewelry was founded in New Orleans in December 1898. It is located at 722 Canal Street in the city's historic shopping district.

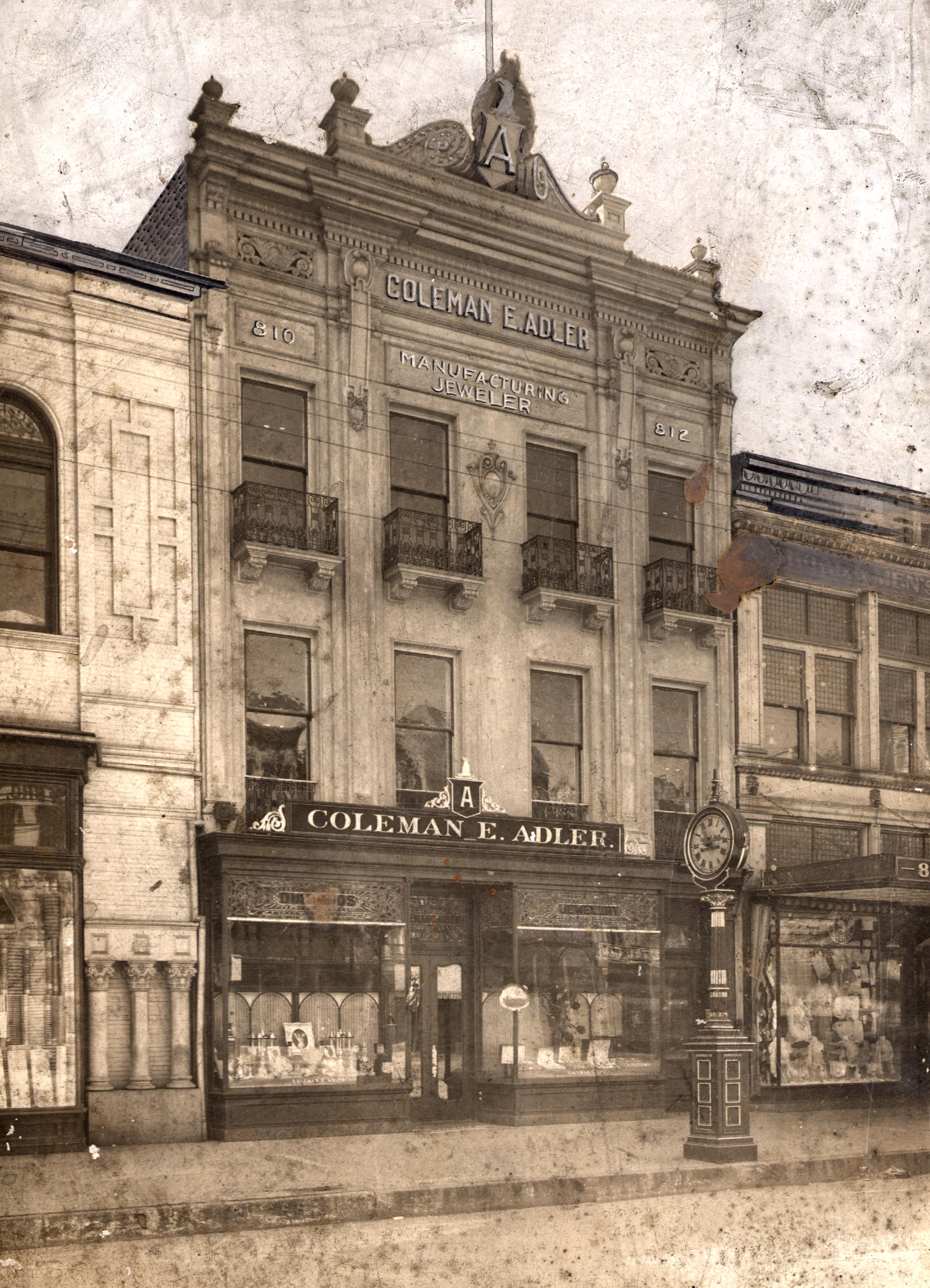
Adler's of New Orleans at 810 Canal Street, ca. 1905.

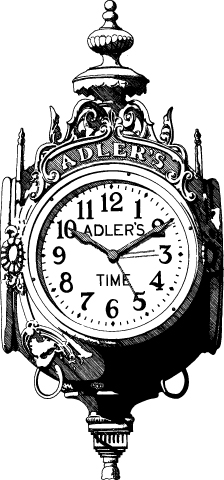
"Adler's Time" signature clock, est. 1910

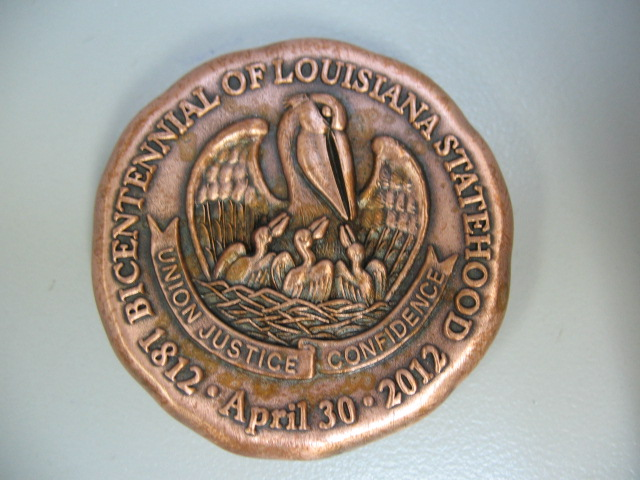
Louisiana Bicentennial Coin, 2012

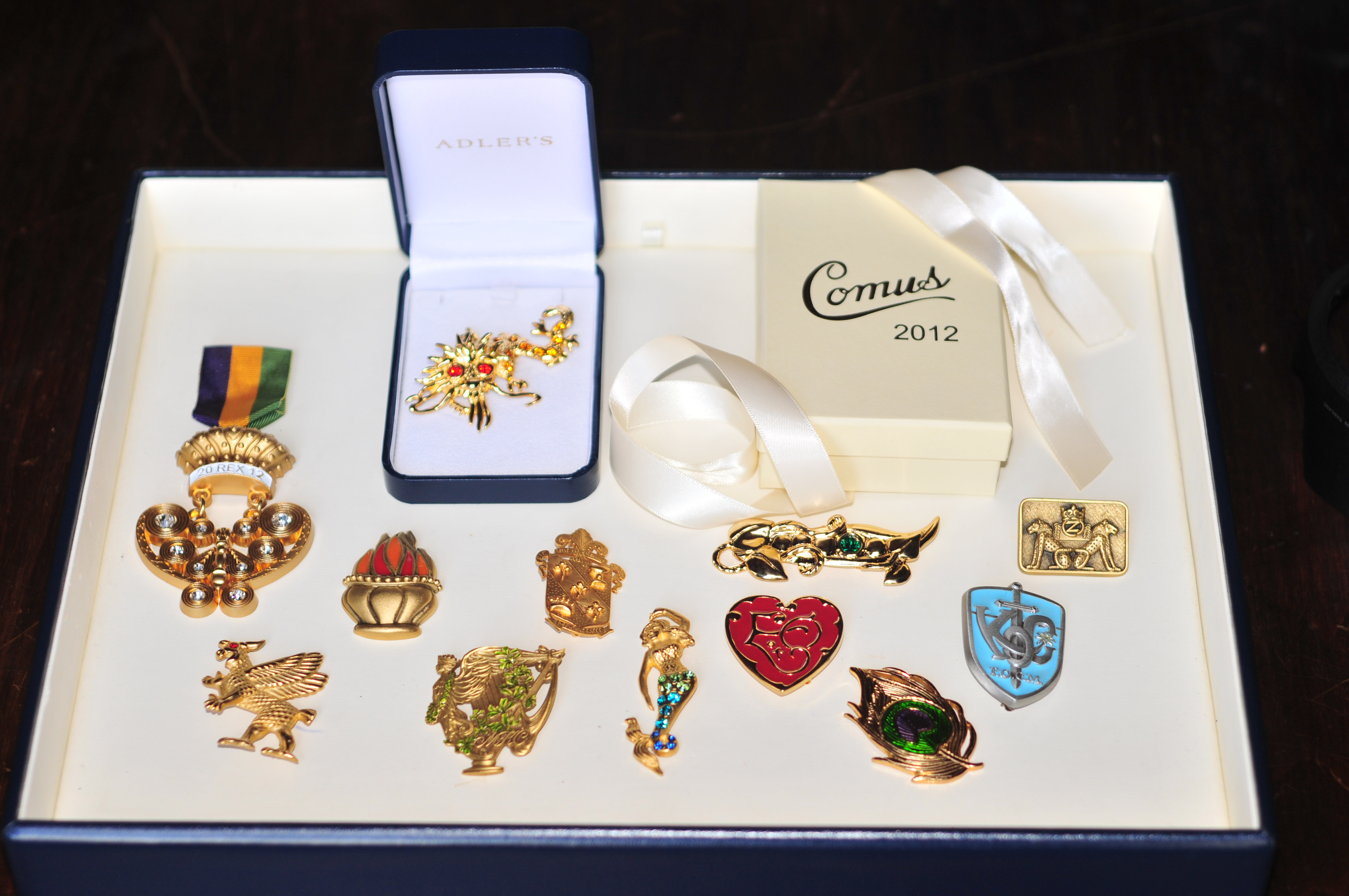
Custom Mardi Gras pins and favors for the Krewe of Comus, 2012

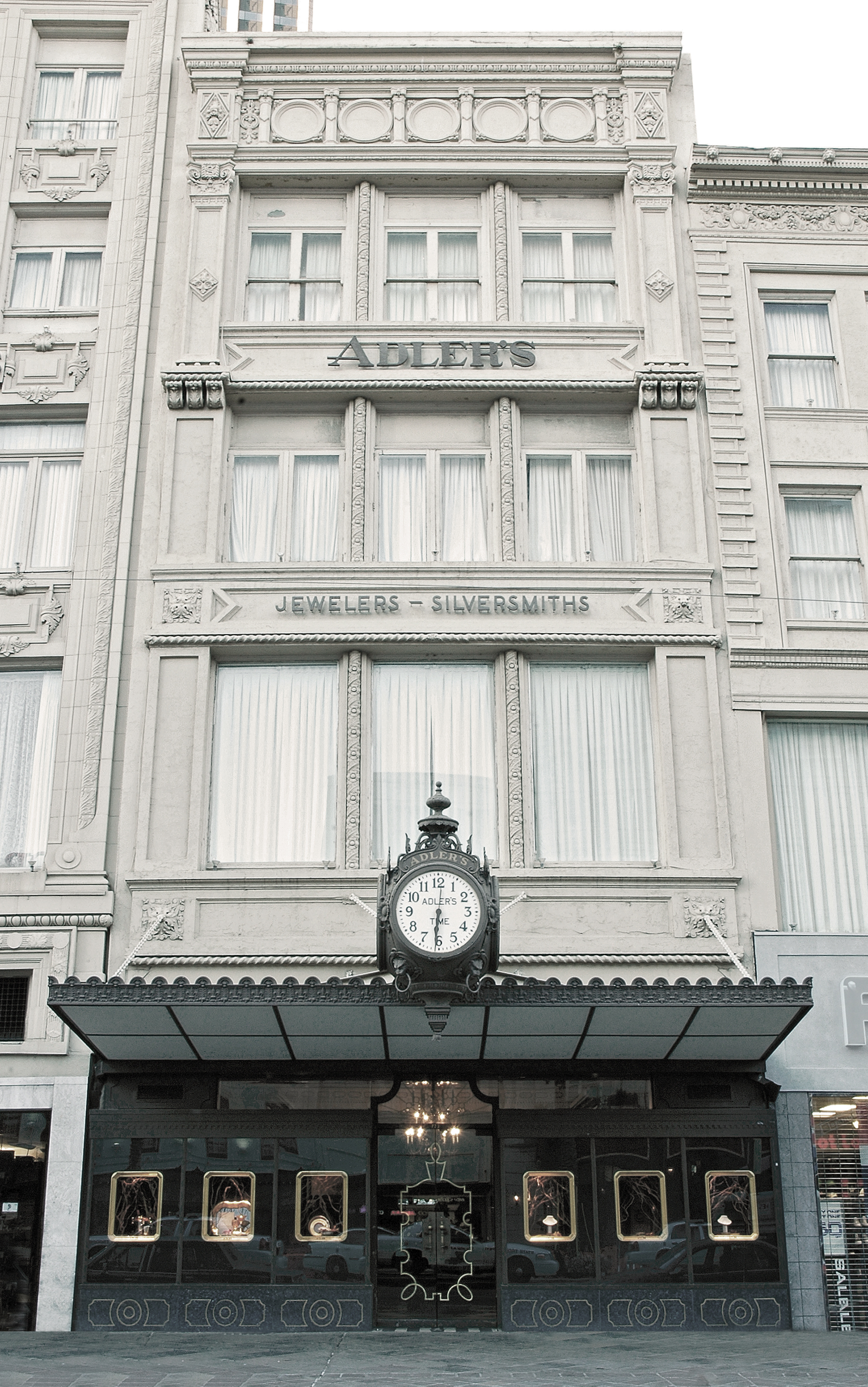
Adler's today at 722-724 Canal Street, New Orleans

== Early history ==
Adler's began as Coleman Adler Jewelry in 1898 in a two-story shop on Royal Street in the French Quarter. In its early years, Adler's designed call-out favors and other jewelry for Mardi Gras krewes.

In 1902, the store moved to 810 Canal Street. Canal Street, New Orleans was the shopping district of the region during the first half of the 20th century, and Coleman E. Adler was active in the Canal Street Commission for over thirty years.

In 1904, Adler's was chosen to create the Times-Picayune Loving Cup awarded to educator Sophie B. Wright. Adler's designed and crafted the silver service of the State of Louisiana presented to the navy's U.S.S. Louisiana upon its first arrival at the port of New Orleans in December 1906.

The firm moved to its current location at 722-724 Canal Street in 1909. In 1912, the State of Louisiana chose Adler's to design and manufacture the official Louisiana Centennial coin. The New York Metropolitan Museum of Art houses one of Adler's Centennial Coins in their permanent collection. Adler's also designed the perpetual silver football trophy awarded to the winner of the annual Thanksgiving Day football game played between Tulane University and Centenary College during the 1920s.

The second generation of Adler's Jewelry began in 1932 when Coleman's sons Milton and Walter Adler joined the company as vice-president and secretary-treasurer. The firm officially changed its name to Coleman E. Adler and Sons. All three of the Adlers contributed regularly to local charitable causes, including the local Red Cross, the Tuberculosis League, Touro Infirmary, the Community Chest, and the annual Doll and Toy Fund.

== A New Orleans tradition ==
Items from Adler's Jewelry have had local favor over the years, including Vacheron-Constantin pocket watches and picayune frog spoons at the turn of the century. Later favorites included crystal oyster plates, sterling silver souvenir spoons, Oscar Heyman pieces, Marcel Boucher moonstone jewelry, Georg Jensen silver, and a series of souvenir plates by Crown Ducal.

Since the 1930s, the store's gift gallery has hosted art and cultural events. The 1937 “Exhibit of Old Masters” featured works by Van Dyck, Reubens, Goya and others on loan from the Metropolitan Art Gallery of New York. Adler's hosted the New Orleans Garden League's annual flower show for many years, as well as a Steuben glass exhibit in cooperation with the Institute of International Education in 1961. The gallery has showcased gems from around the world, including the Maximilian diamond and the Black Star sapphire of Queensland.

In 1953, Tiffany and Co. of New York chose Adler's as its sole local representative. That same year, Adler's designed the official 14-carat gold plaque commemorating the 150th anniversary of the Louisiana Purchase presented to President Eisenhower.

Adler's regularly coordinated their window displays with events in civic life. The store created a special display for the local Association of Commerce's “Made in New Orleans Week.” Adler's displayed local high school students’ work spotlighting the field of social work in 1935, and created a window display of special medals awarded by the branches of the U.S. armed services for National Defense Week in 1937. In 1953, the New Orleans Chamber of Commerce awarded Adler's a plaque for the best store window display during "World Trade Week."

== Adler’s today ==
Adler's Jewelry is now owned and run by third and fourth generation members of the Adler family. Coleman E. Adler II, the founder's grandson, is president of the firm. His children Tiffany, Mickal, Coleman III, and Mildred Ann Adler are on the executive team. The company creates signature designs for Mardi Gras krewes each year, and Adler's is the local dealer for Patek Philippe watches, Gien tableware, and Royal Copenhagen china. In 2012, Adler's minted the Louisiana Bicentennial coin using its original press from the 1912 Centennial coin.
