= Daniel Henry Holmes =

American businessman

Daniel Henry Holmes (April 28, 1816 – July 3, 1898) was born in the Point Pleasant area of Clermont County, Ohio. Orphaned at age two, he lacked any formal education. He became a successful businessman, developing the D.H. Holmes department store business in New Orleans in 1842 and opening the store in 1849. It was the largest in the South, with more than 700 employees.

== Early life and education ==
Daniel Henry Holmes was born in Point Pleasant, Ohio, on April 28, 1816. Both of his parents died when he was two years old, and he eventually became friends with the children of Eugene Lavassor. The Lavassors were in the dry goods business, and also spoke French. Holmes eventually was sent to New York by Lavassor to work at Lord and Taylor. When Lord and Taylor, a few years later, opened a New Orleans store, Holmes, who spoke French as a result of the Lavassors, was an obvious candidate to run their store. French was a dominant language in New Orleans at the time.

After several years in New Orleans, he opened his own department store in April of 1842, called the D. H. Holmes Department Store. It made him a rich man. Not wanting to keep his family in the hot South in the summer, he built a summer home in Covington, KY on what is now the Holmes campus. His original estate was called "Holmesdale," and more or less was bordered by Madison, 25th Street, the Licking River, and Lavassor Avenue.

He also had homes in New York City, New Orleans, and Tours, France.

Holmes died on July 3, 1898, in New York. His body was sent to New Orleans to be buried in the family crypt, but disappeared.

Holmesdale “Castle” was inherited by his son, Daniel Henry Holmes Junior, but was mostly ignored by him. At the son's death, the daughter in law, Rachel Susanna Goff Holmes, sold 13 acres of the estate to the Covington School Board for $50,000. A senior high building was started east of the castle in 1916, finished in 1919. A Junior high was built to the west in 1926. And needing space for a cafeteria, offices and more classroom the Board elected to raze the castle. Its contents were auctioned. Everything that did not sell was burned on the football field, and the building was demolished over Thanksgiving, 1936.

Holmes made his way to New Orleans, working on riverboats. He eventually went into business for himself in 1842 with his retail company, and built the D.H. Holmes department store in 1849 on Canal Street in New Orleans, at the edge of the French Quarter. The city was booming and prosperous, buoyed by its port, from where it exported cotton to Great Britain and France, and by its large slave market and associated businesses. Holmes borrowed ideas from the pioneering department stores in England and Paris, such as Le Bon Marché, as well as major New York City retailers. Department stores were a new way of doing business that appealed to many shoppers, and the D.H. Holmes store became a city landmark.

In Holmes' many trips by steamboat between New York and New Orleans in the early 1850s, the businessman frequently journeyed by the Ohio River and was attracted to Covington, Kentucky, as a rest stop. Holmes bought land in the Kenton County area known as Buena Vista; in 1866, he began to build the home of his dreams. He named the three-story, English-gothic castle as Holmesdale. The 32-room mansion was built on about 17 acres (69,000 m^{2}). Holmes divided his time between Holmesdale, a home in France, and an apartment in New Orleans.

By his death in 1898, Holmes had become fluent in the French, German, and Spanish languages. His New Orleans department store was the largest in the South, with more than 700 employees. Holmes often said he owed his success as a businessman to his commitment to selling only the best merchandise. He traveled extensively across the country and to Europe, searching out the products he sold.

Holmes died on July 3, 1898, while on a business trip to New York. His personal estate was valued at more than $1.2 million. Holmes' obituary ran on the front page of The Kentucky Post on July 4, 1898. The article termed Holmes the "retail king of New Orleans" and !one of the richest people in Covington."

In 1915 the Holmes family sold the Holmesdale mansion to the Covington Board of Education for $50,538.36. The site is now part of the Holmes Junior/Senior High School campus.

D.H. Holmes in New Orleans was bought by Dillard's in 1989, becoming part of a chain. The original store on Canal Street was sold and redeveloped as a boutique hotel, opening in 1995 as Chateau Sonesta. It was renovated in 2012 and is now the Hyatt French Quarter Hotel.
