= Hyatt Centric French Quarter New Orleans Hotel =

Hotel in New Orleans, Louisiana

Coordinates: 29.9551°N 90.0700°W

Hyatt Centric French Quarter New Orleans
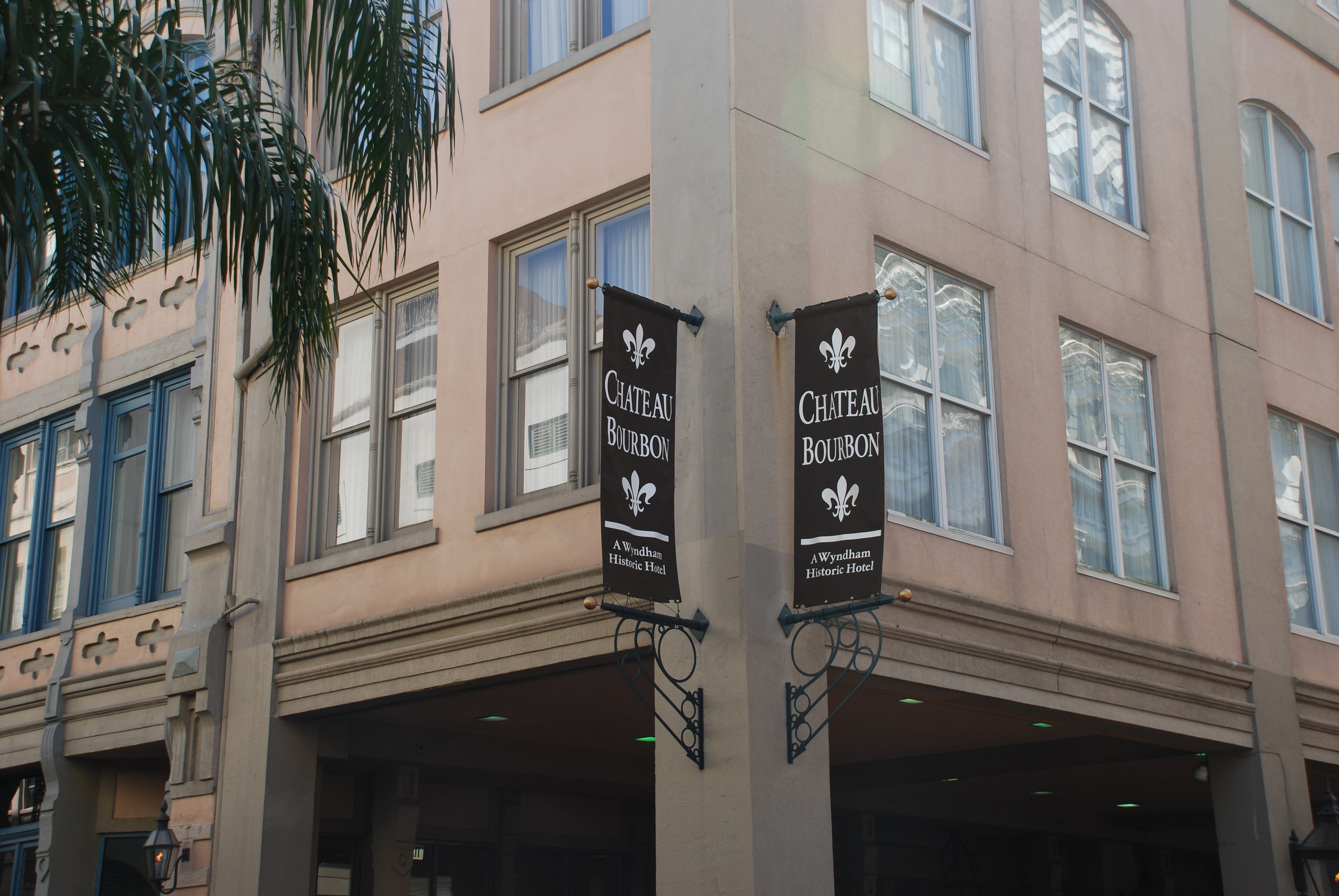
- The hotel in 2009 (prior to being renamed the Hyatt French Quarter Hotel)
- Interactive map of the Hyatt Centric French Quarter New Orleans area
- Hotel chain: Hyatt

General information
- Location: United States, 800 Iberville St., New Orleans, Louisiana, United States
- Opening: 1995
- Operator: HRI Lodging, Inc.

Technical details
- Floor count: 4

Other information
- Number of rooms: 254
- Number of restaurants: 3

Website
- http://frenchquarter.centric.hyatt.com/

Hyatt Centric French Quarter New Orleans is a hotel on Canal Street in New Orleans, Louisiana. A downtown landmark, the building was constructed in 1849 and served as a highly successful department store for more than a century. The structure was redeveloped as a boutique hotel, opening in 1995. It features suites named for writers Tennessee Williams and John Kennedy Toole, as well for jazz musician Louis Armstrong – all of whose work is associated with the city and the Quarter.

== Building history ==
On October 15, 1849, Daniel Henry Holmes established the D. H. Holmes department store on Canal Street. A pioneering venture in retail at the time, and styled after stores in Paris, it became known as one of the most successful retail businesses in the country and a Canal Street landmark. In 1989, the Dillard's department store chain bought D. H. Holmes.

== Redevelopment as hotel ==
The City of New Orleans and Historic Restoration Inc. collaborated to redevelop the building as a luxury hotel, given demand in the French Quarter. The hotel opened in 1995 as the Chateau Sonesta. It was renamed Chateau Bourbon - A Wyndham Hotel in 2008 when it joined the Wyndham chain.

It was renamed Hyatt French Quarter in early May 2012. The Hyatt French Quarter contains a suite named for John Kennedy Toole, an award-winning late 20th-century author, as well as ones honoring Louis Armstrong and Tennessee Williams, artists associated with the Quarter. The hotel moved from the Hyatt division to the Hyatt Centric division on September 1, 2016 and was renamed Hyatt Centric French Quarter New Orleans.

== D.H. Holmes clock ==
The D.H. Holmes department store was known for its clock on the Canal Street facade, which became a popular meeting place. The clock disappeared about the time the D.H. Holmes store closed, but it was anonymously returned to the hotel in 1995.

Under the clock is a life-size sculpture titled Ignatius Reilly. This is a fictional character featured in John Kennedy Toole's Pulitzer Prize-winning novel, A Confederacy of Dunces. In the novel's opening scene, Reilly meets his mother at the clock. The sculpture was financed as public art jointly by Chateau Sonesta (the name of the hotel at the time) and the Downtown Development District.
