= D. H. Holmes =

Defunct department store chain

D.H. Holmes
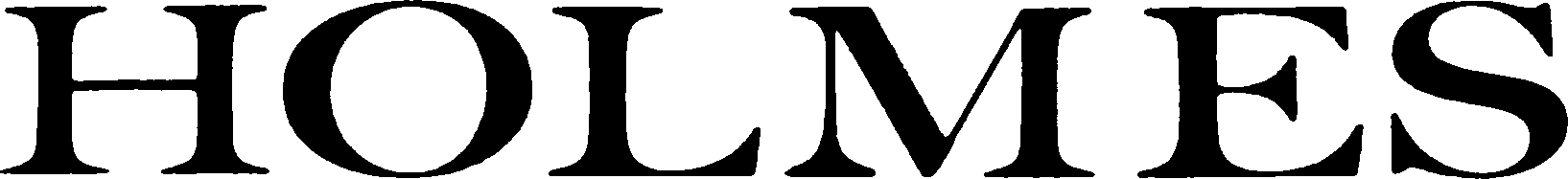

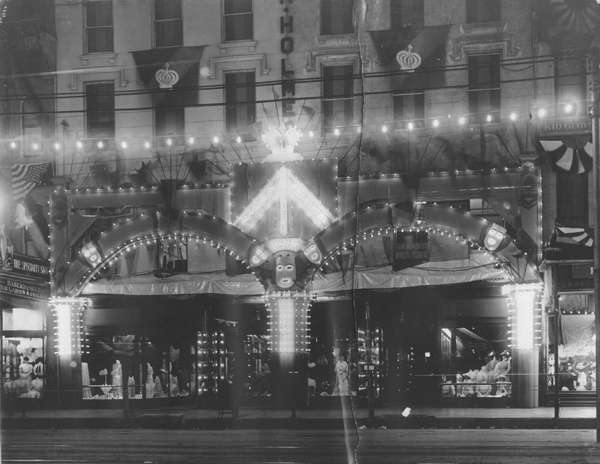
- Type: Public
- Industry: Retail
- Founded: 1842
- Founders: Daniel Henry Holmes
- Defunct: 1989 (Acquired By Dillard's)
- Headquarters: New Orleans, Louisiana
- Area served: Louisiana, Mississippi.
- Products: Clothing, footwear, bedding, furniture, jewelry, beauty products, and housewares

D. H. Holmes was a New Orleans department store and later a New Orleans–based chain of department stores. The company was founded in 1842 by Daniel Henry Holmes, after whom it is named. In 1849 he moved his headquarters to Canal Street, where he developed his first department store. He followed the model of pioneering department stores in Paris and New York City to offer his customers the best products and services.

D.H. Holmes's main building on Canal Street was long considered a landmark. By the end of the 19th century, it was the largest department store in the South, with customers being served by more than 700 employees. Meeting under its clock, located on the Canal Street facade, was a popular rendezvous when this part of the city was a major shopping area. In the first scene of the Pulitzer Prize-winning novel, A Confederacy of Dunces by John Kennedy Toole, the character Ignatius Reilly agrees to meet his mother at the clock.

In the 1970s the store employed artist Charles Kerbs, who designed an Art Nouveau-style mural for the company as well as elaborate holiday window displays.

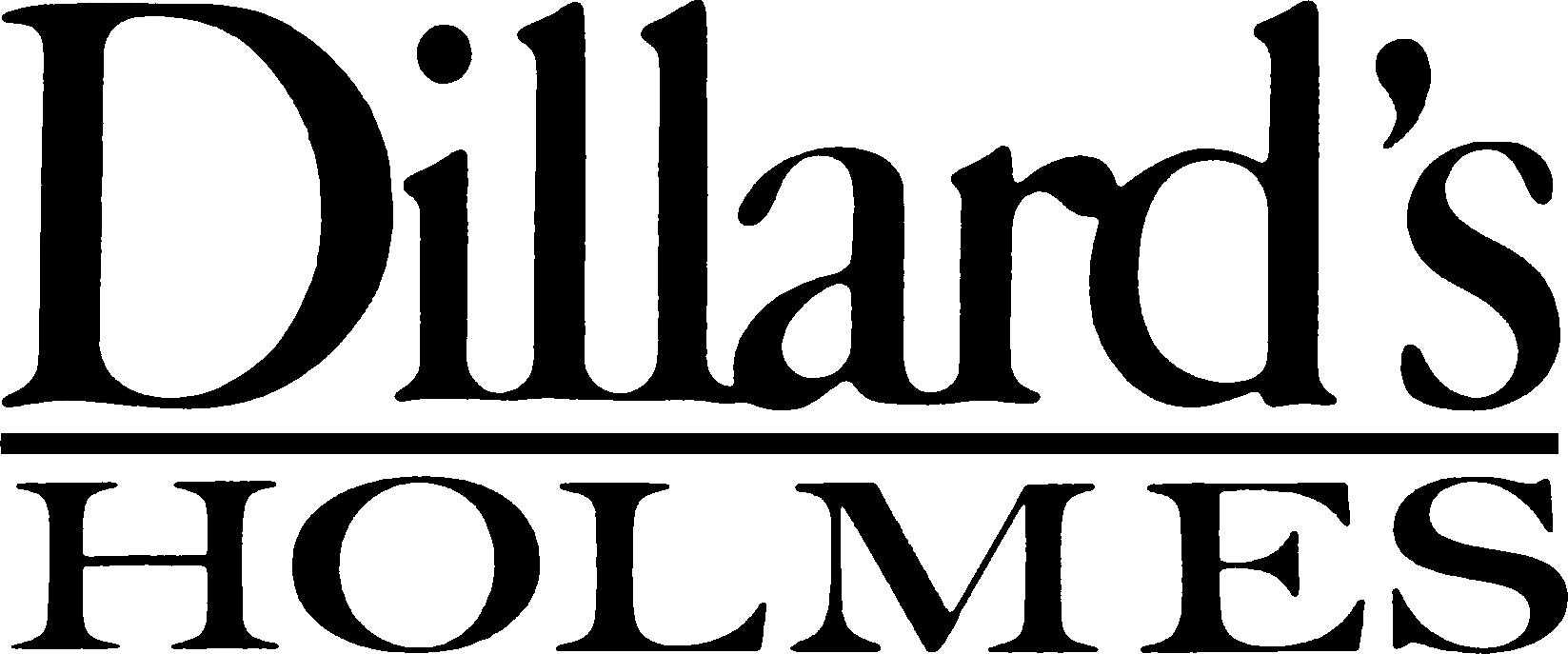
Dillard's-Holmes transition logo

In 1989 D.H. Holmes was purchased by Dillard's, one of numerous mergers among retail stores.

The former main store of D.H. Holmes was redeveloped as a boutique hotel and opened in 1995 as the Chateau Sonesta Hotel. It completed a major renovation of all guest rooms, lobby, swimming pool, bar, and meeting spaces in May 2012, and is now the Hyatt French Quarter Hotel, managed by HRI Lodging.

== See also ==
- Maison Blanche
- Dillard's
