= Oscar Heyman & Brothers =

American fine jewellery design and manufacturing firm

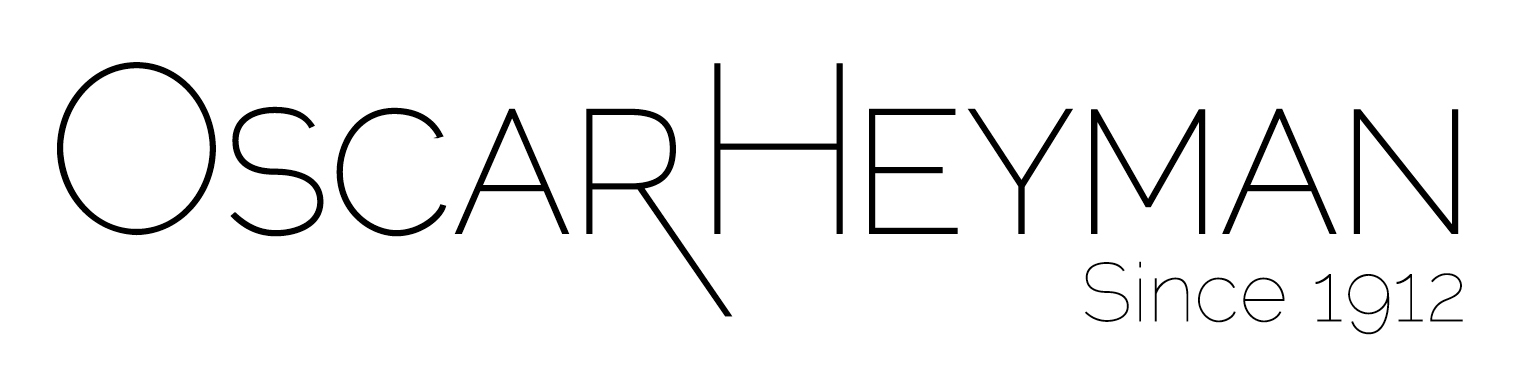
The Oscar Heyman & Brothers official logo.

Oscar Heyman & Brothers is an American fine jewellery design and manufacturing firm. The company is known for its expertise in manufacturing and as well as its use of colored gemstones. The company is known in the jewelry industry as ′The Jewelers’ Jeweler,′ which is the name of the book on the company researched, written, and published by the Museum of Fine Arts, Boston.

== History ==
Oscar, Nathan, and Harry Heyman founded the company in 1912 in New York City. They were later joined by their three younger brothers, George, William, and Louis, along with two sisters, Frances and Lena. Today, Oscar Heyman is managed by the second and third generations of the family. The current officers of the company are Adam C. Heyman (President), Thomas Heyman (Co-President), and Lewis Heyman (Co-President).

=== Manufacturing ===
Oscar and Nathan learned the art of working in platinum jewelry as apprentices at a workshop in Kharkiv, Ukraine. They emigrated to New York in 1906 and set up their own shop in October 1912 on Maiden Lane. In February 1916, the company was granted its first of six U.S. patents related to jewelry making. The office and manufacturing facilities have remained in New York, and are today on Madison Avenue. The firm employs designers, jewelers, lapidaries, setters, engravers, and a tool and die shop.

=== The Jewelers’ Jeweler ===
At the World’s Fair in 1939, Oscar Heyman made jewelry for 4 of the 5 retailers exhibiting in the House of Jewels, thus earning the company the trade name ‘The Jewelers’ Jeweler.’ In April 2017, the Museum of Fine Arts, Boston published a book on the brand by the same name.

== Retail relationships ==
Oscar Heyman & Brothers is a wholesale business, selling through retail stores. Oscar Heyman & Brothers produced jewelry for 20th century retailers such as Black, Starr & Frost, Udall & Ballou, Marcus & Co, J.E. Caldwell & Co, Laykin et Cie, and Shreve, Crump & Low. The firm produced invisibly set jewelry made in New York for Van Cleef & Arpels from 1939 – 2001, up until the time the Richemont Group acquired a majority interest. Oscar Heyman produced jewelry for Tiffany & Co. including American Flag pins, pansy brooches, and guard rings. Oscar Heyman also had a relationship with Cartier, dating to around 1910 when Oscar was hired by Pierre C. Cartier at his newly established New York workshop. Working for Cartier in 1969, Oscar Heyman & Brothers designed and crafted the pear shape diamond necklace for the Taylor- Burton Diamond.

=== Notable Clients ===
Elizabeth Taylor, Nancy Reagan, Evelyn Lauder, Marjorie Merriweather Post, President Jimmy Carter, Frank Lloyd Wright, John Hay Whitney, Benno Charles Schmidt Sr.

== Awards ==
- 2017: AGTA Spectrum Awards
- 2014: PGI-USA’s JCK Platinum Innovation Awards
- 2002: AGTA Spectrum Awards
