= Canal Street, New Orleans =

Street in New Orleans, Louisiana

Canal Street
- Rue du Canal (French)
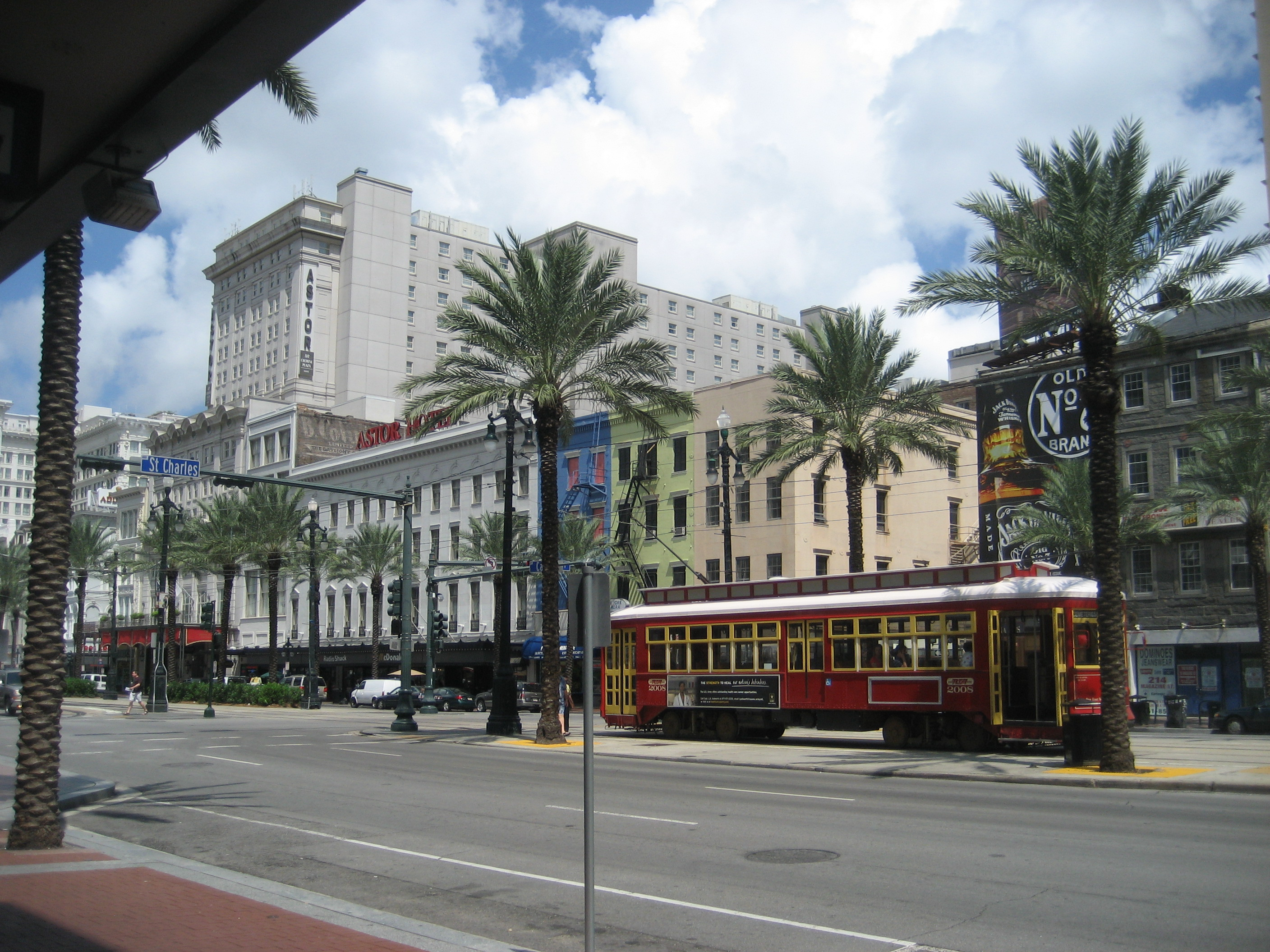
- Canal Street in 2009
- Length: 3.6 mi (5.8 km)
- Width: 171 ft (52 m)
- Location: New Orleans, Louisiana, United States
- West end: City Park Avenue Navarre–Mid-City neighborhood line
- Major junctions: US 90 at the Mid-City–Tulane-Gravier neighborhood line I-10 in the Central Business District
- East end: Canal Street Ferry Terminal in the Central Business District

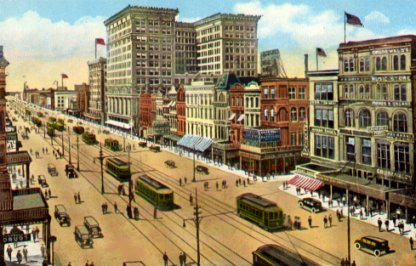
Canal Street in the Central Business District, looking away from the river, 1920s

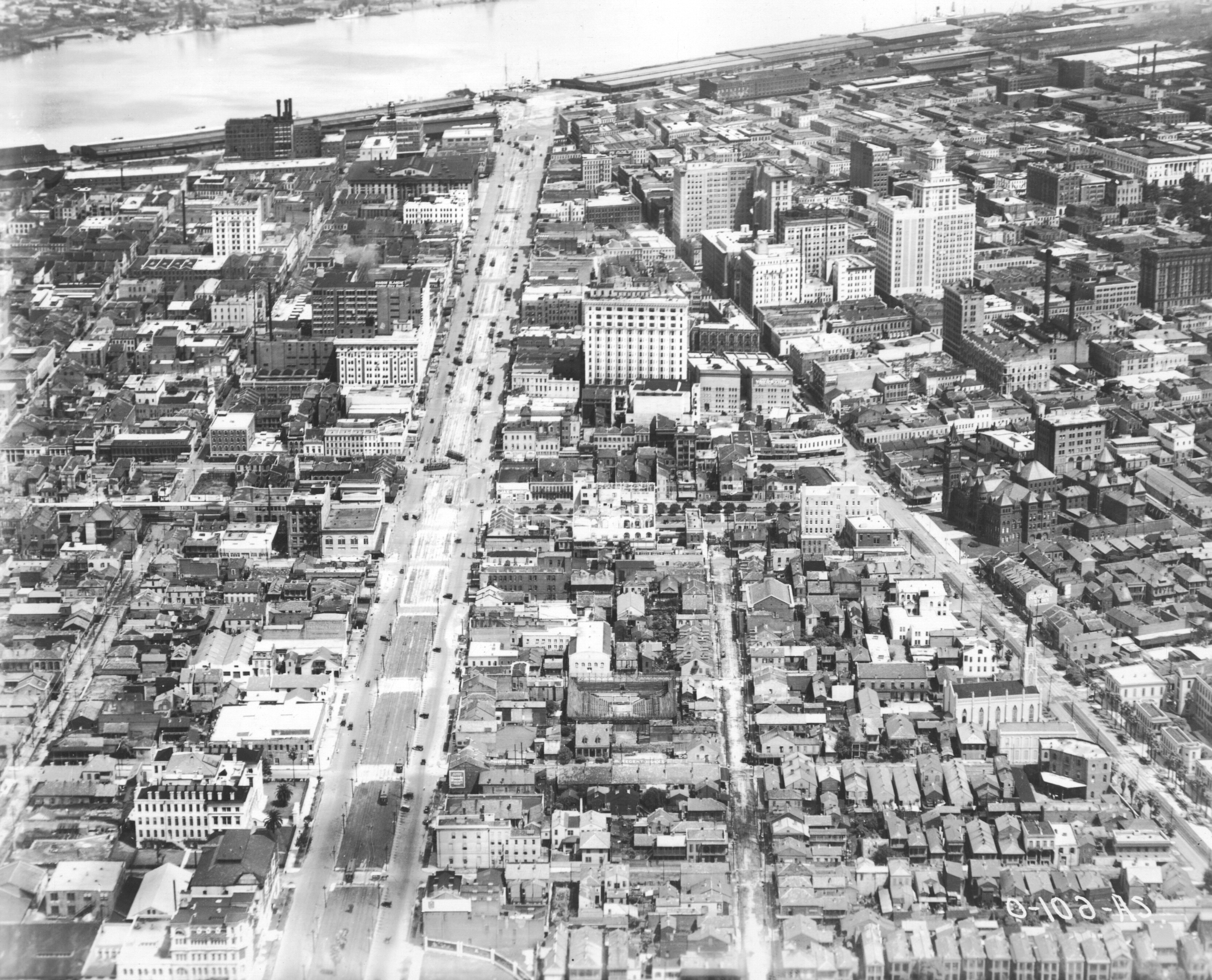
Aerial view of Canal Street in the Central Business District, 1922

Canal Street (French: Rue du Canal) is a major thoroughfare in the city of New Orleans. Forming the upriver boundary of the city's oldest neighborhood, the French Quarter or Vieux Carré, it served historically as the dividing line between the colonial-era (18th-century) city and the newer American Sector, today's Central Business District.

Up until the early 1800s, it was primarily Creoles who lived in the Vieux Carré. After the Louisiana Purchase (1803), a large influx of other cultures began to find their way into the city via the Mississippi River. A number of Americans from Kentucky and the Midwest moved into the city and settled uptown. Along the division between these two cultures, a canal was planned. The canal was never built but the street which took its place received the name. Furthermore, the median of the street became known as the neutral ground, acknowledging the cultural divide. To this day, all medians of New Orleans streets are called neutral grounds.

One end of Canal Street terminates at the Mississippi River. Sometimes called "the head" or "front" of Canal Street, at the riverfront the Canal Street Ferry offers a connection to the Algiers Point neighborhood, an older, 18th-century portion of the larger Algiers section of New Orleans. The street continues inland from the Central Business District through the Mid-City section, to Canal Street's other terminus is at a collection of cemeteries, commemorated in the popular song "At the Foot of Canal Street by John Boutté and Paul Sanchez. Slightly offset from the Mid-City end is the beginning of Canal Boulevard, which extends to the shore of Lake Pontchartrain via the Lakeview neighborhood. Throughout its length, Canal, which runs east and west, serves as a dividing line for cross streets running north and south; although the New Orleans layout follows the Mississippi River.

The street has three lanes of traffic in both directions, with a pair of streetcar tracks in the center. Canal Street's downtown segment serves as the hub of the city's public transit system or RTA, with numerous streetcar and bus route terminals. (Of note, it is the home of the Canal Streetcar Line, operated by the RTA.)

Canal Street has been called "America's widest main street." Canal Street is often said to be the widest roadway in America to have been called a street, instead of the avenue or boulevard titles more typically appended to wide urban thoroughfares.

== History ==
In 1796, Bertrand Gravier helped enlarge Faubourg Sainte Marie by including Phillipa St., which is now referred to as Poydras Street. Years later, Gravier died and Jean Gravier, his brother, was appointed to be the new owner of this estate. He continued in his brother's footsteps by further extending the Faubourg to Circus Street, which is currently known as Rampart Street. As Jean Gravier continued to expand the Faubourg, he allotted land near Poydras Street, approximately 40 feet in width, for a canal. This canal linked with an agency in Bayou St. John and flowed into an area called Hagan Avenue. The region which was the canal is now Jefferson Davis Parkway. In addition, Gravier designated a tract for a turning basin which linked to Canal Street. At that time the basin was an uninhabited district of land which was allocated for the community. Unsurprisingly, he later called the basin "Place Gravier."

Jean Gravier didn't realize that the canal and “Place Gravier” would become the basis of dissension between the city of New Orleans and the New Orleans and Carrollton Railroad. At this time, the railroad company possessed the Canal, the Basin, and asserted ownership of segments of “Place Gravier.” The dispute between New Orleans and the railroad concluded when the Supreme Court of the Territory of Orleans announced a judgment in support of Jean Gravier, on May 23, 1805.

In 1841, the Supreme Court of Louisiana pronounced that the Canal and Basin were property of the railroad company. However, years later, in 1876, the Supreme Court altered their judgment and decided that the “Place Gravier” would be owned by New Orleans and as a location for the general public. This explains why in 1897, the city of New Orleans took legal action against Philip Werlein for possession of this basin. The location was declared to be public property as had been stated in the judgment of 1841. New Orleans won the lawsuit against Werlein and the Supreme Court of Louisiana. When the displeased Werlein decided that this verdict wasn't fair, he appealed the finding to the Supreme Court of the United States and they rendered a judgment in support of him. The U.S. Supreme Court reasoned that New Orleans had lost ownership of “Place Gravier.” So Philip Werlein was able to obtain possession of the disputed property, and this site is now occupied by the infamous Hotel de Soto.

== Shopping ==
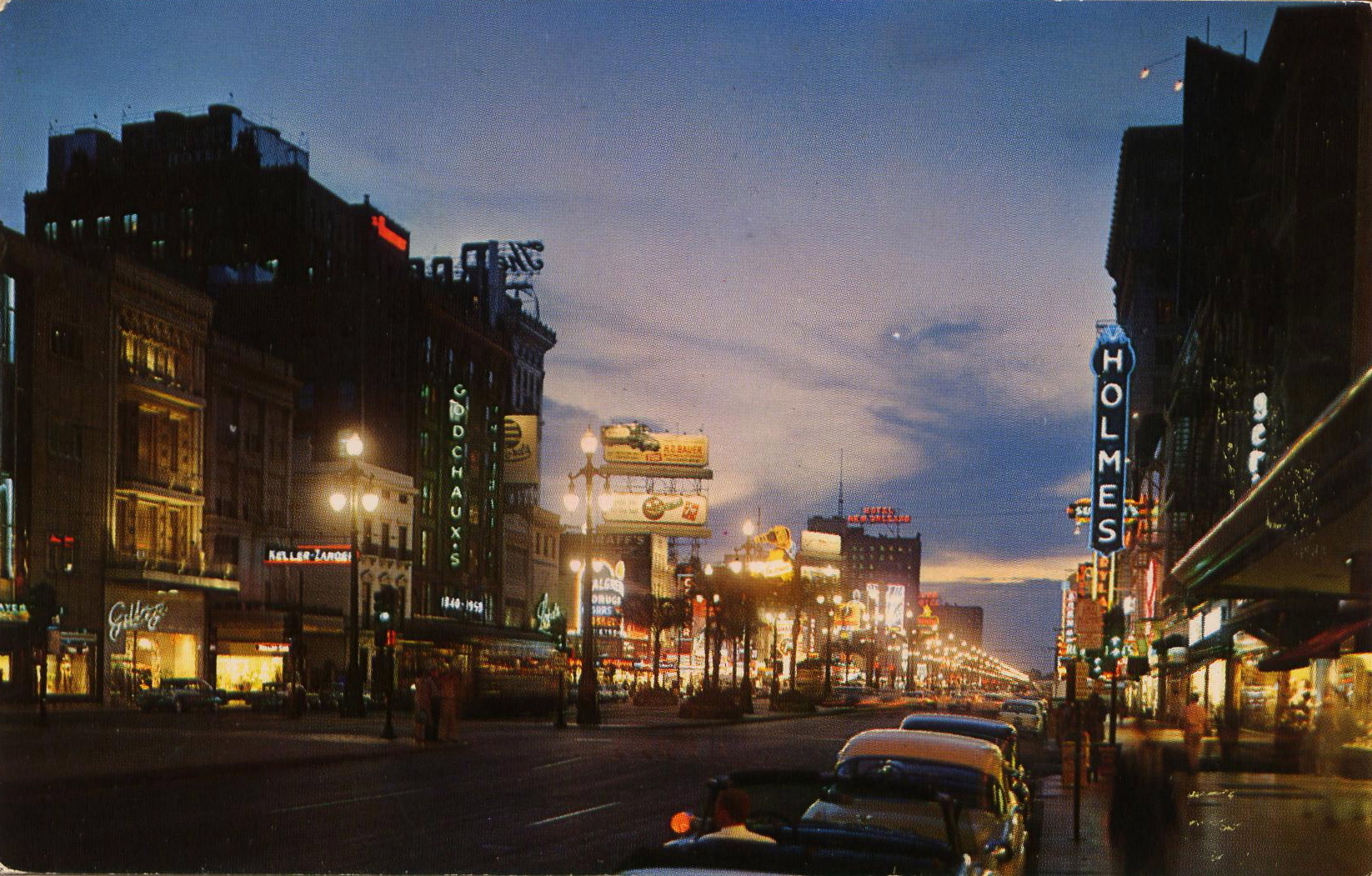
Canal Street Central Business District, 1950s

For more than a century, Canal Street was the main shopping district of Greater New Orleans. Local or regional department stores Maison Blanche, D. H. Holmes, Godchaux's, Gus Mayer, Labiche's, Kreeger's, and Krauss anchored numerous well-known specialty retailers, such as Rubenstein Men's Store, Adler's Jewelry, Koslow's, Rapp's, and Werlein's Music, as well as bookstores, drugstores, Kress, Woolworth's, and others. The department stores began as sellers of fabric, notions, and accessories, with extensive floor space and glass windows. As elevators and escalators allowed for multi-floor department stores, the stores were enlarged and made more elegant by incorporating adjoining buildings.

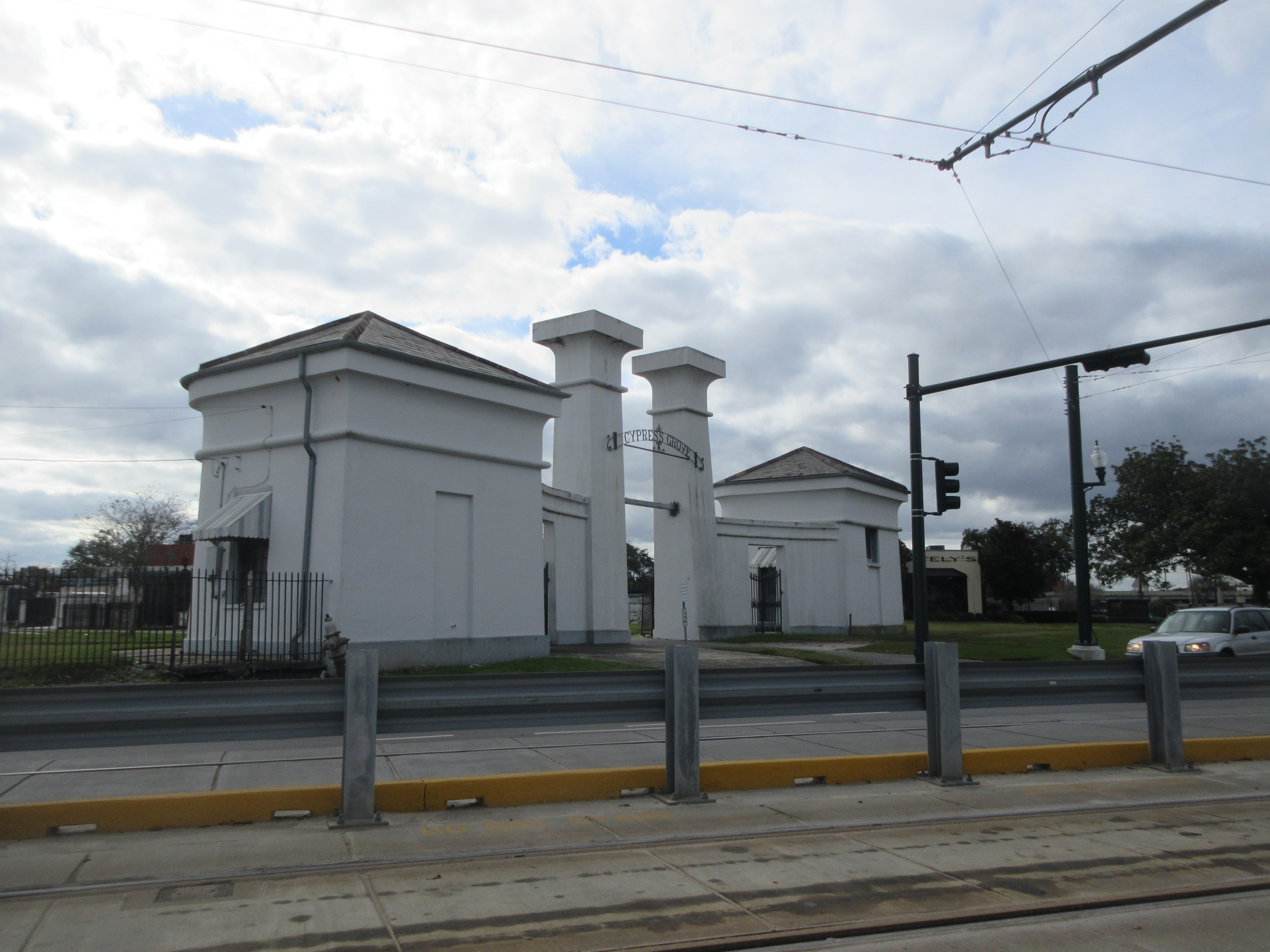
Cypress Grove, one of the group of cemeteries at the foot of Canal Street.

Although Canal Street began to lose its primacy as a regional shopping destination in the late 1960s, it retained a robust mix of department stores and specialty shopping into the mid-1980s — somewhat later than main-street shopping districts in other U.S. cities — and it received a boost in 1983 with the completion of Canal Place's retail component. However, national trends disfavoring downtown retail finally caught up with Canal Street — with a key assist from the regional economic depression of the mid-80s (the Oil Bust).

One Canal Place has three lower levels which are occupied by The Shops at Canal Place. The mall contains a Saks Fifth Avenue, the Theatres at Canal Place, a food court, and approximately 45 high-end retailers including Anthropologie, Brooks Brothers, Michael Kors, and Morton's the Steakhouse. In the aftermath of Hurricane Katrina, a fire inflicted heavy damage to the Saks Fifth Avenue store. The mall reopened in February 2006, and a completely-remodeled Saks reopened in November.

One Canal Place Office Tower is a Class A commercial office building managed by Corporate Realty. It is adjacent to the Westin New Orleans Hotel. The office space is made up of more than 650,000 square feet (60,000 m^{2}) and includes a parking garage and health club facilities.

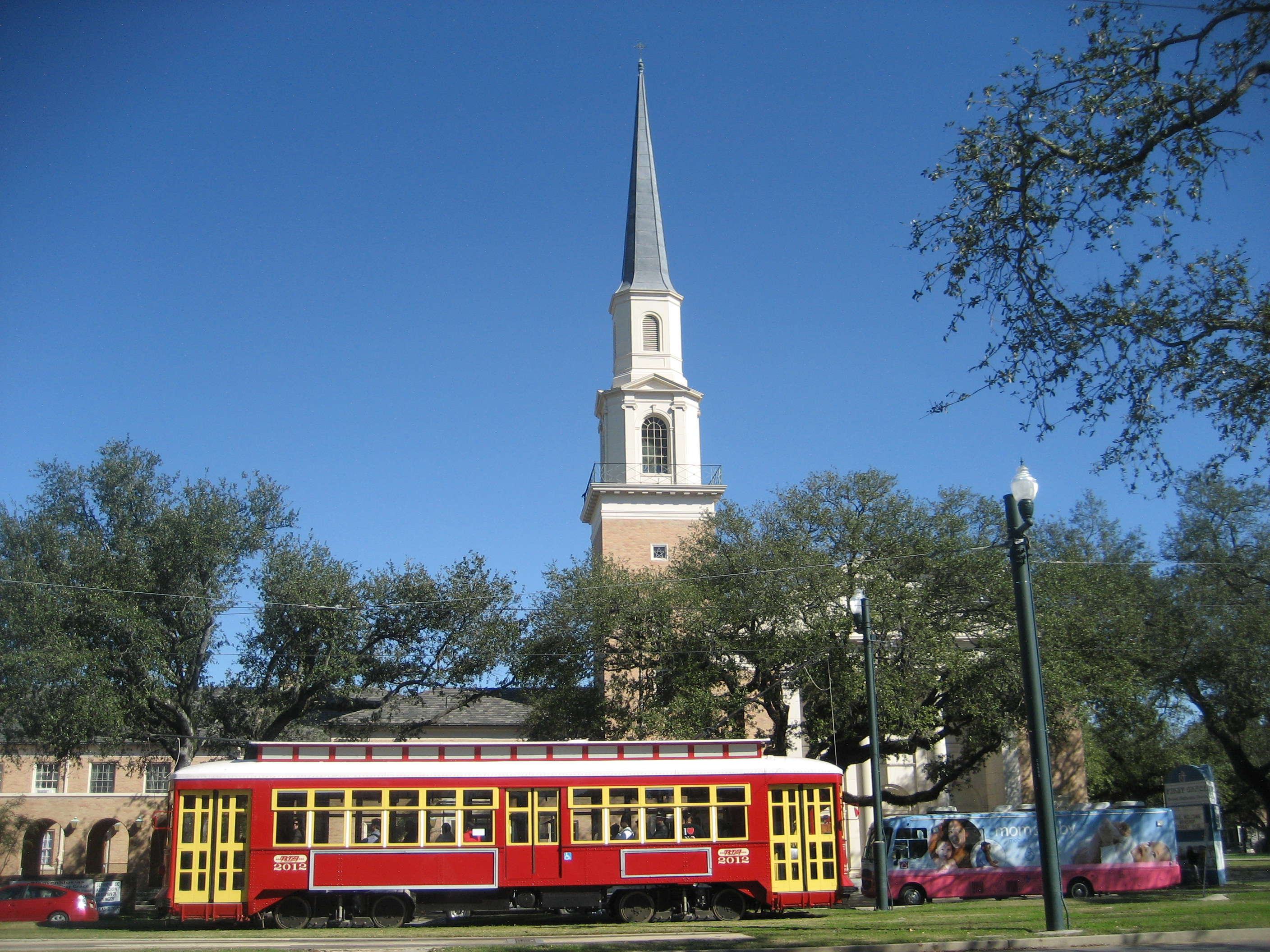
Streetcar passing First Grace Methodist Church on Canal Street in Mid-City New Orleans, 2009

== Entertainment ==
New Orleans has historically been a center for opera, theater, and concerts. In 1871 the Varieties Theater opened on Canal Street between Dauphine and Burgundy streets. The building was renovated and renamed the Grand Opera House in 1881, which could be used as both a theater and ballroom. Theaters and movie houses were clustered around the intersection with Rampart Street, with the neon marquees of the Saenger, Loews State, Orpheum, and Joy casting multi-colored light nightly onto surrounding sidewalks.

It is said that the world's first movie theater (that is, the first business devoted specifically to showing films for profit) was "Vitascope Hall", established on Canal Street in 1896. By the 1910s there were several movie theaters on Canal, including the Alamo, the Plaza, and the Dreamworld. In 1912 the Trianon, the first "movie palace" in the city opened. The Tudor followed in 1914 and the Globe in 1918. By the 1950s they had become low-grade theaters, and in the 1960s they were closed.

Although most of the grand movie theaters have closed over the years, several cinemas on Canal Street operate today.

== Hotels ==
In the 1830s, several hotels on Canal Street near the river were in operation, including the Union Hotel and the Planters Hotel. Although most of the grand 19th-century hotels were located in the French Quarter, the Perry House was on Canal Street. By the 1920s a growth was seen in the number of hotels on Canal Street. These included the LaSalle Hotel, the Hotel New Orleans, and the Jung Hotel with its rooftop ballroom. As convention industry began to grow in the 1960s, the Governor House Motor Hotel and the International Hotel were built. Almost a whole block was taken up by the Marriott Hotel which opened in 1972 as the tallest hotel in the city.

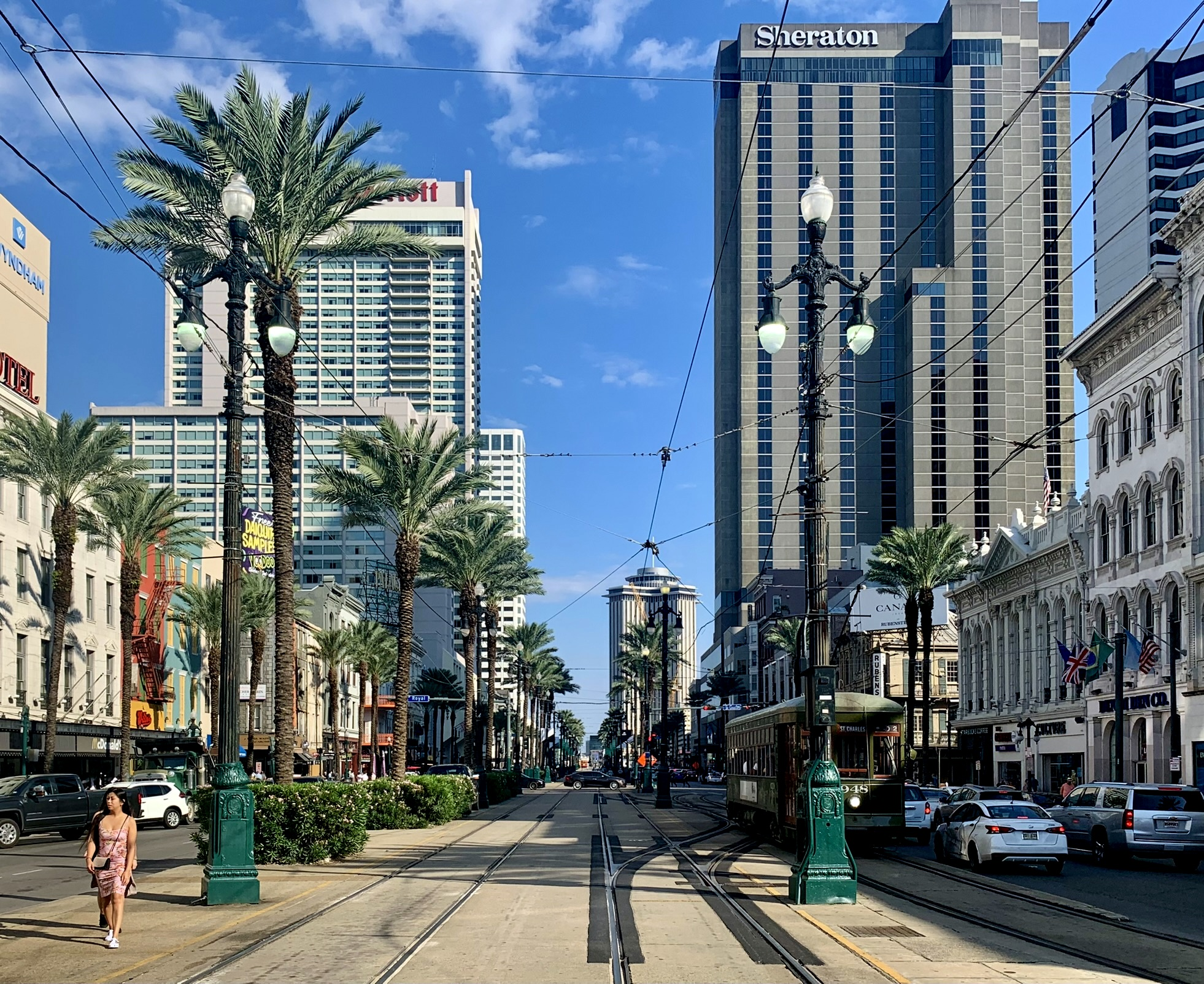
Facing riverwards (south) on Canal Street in the Central Business District. The Sheraton New Orleans, New Orleans Marriott and Four Seasons Hotel and Private Residences New Orleans are visible.

Canal Street began to accommodate large convention hotels, such as the Sheraton New Orleans and the JW Marriott. The emergence of new hotels has since slowed, but continued operation of many on Canal Street indicate the sustained importance of the street in both business and entertainment. (See Redevelopment section below, for additional Canal Street hotels.)

Two of Canal Street's former department stores are now hotels. D. H. Holmes has become the Hyatt Centric French Quarter Hotel, and the former Maison Blanche store is now the New Orleans Ritz-Carlton Hotel. Both are on the French Quarter side of Canal.

At least two other high-rise hotels are just off Canal Street, the Roosevelt in the Central Business District (CBD) and the Monteleone in the French Quarter. In the 19th century, the St. Charles Hotel on St. Charles Avenue was another icon of the CBD.

== Redevelopment ==
Both business and government leaders in New Orleans have taken steps over the past 50 years to encourage development and corporate centered business in the city. These began with the construction of the Superdome using public money, choosing not to build an expressway along the Mississippi River in the French Quarter and allowing the riverfront to be developed for tourism, and the under used wharves made available by the New Orleans public port authority for non-maritime use in the 1960s. These decisions opened the door for changes in land use, encouraging business, especially that of the tourism industry, for the city. The downtown New Orleans segment of Canal Street has been undergoing redevelopment along the lines called for in the Downtown Development District's Canal Street Vision and Development Strategy (2004). In recent years the street has welcomed the addition of numerous new anchor enterprises, including the Ritz-Carlton New Orleans, luxury apartments at 1201 Canal, the New Orleans Bio-Innovation Center, the rehabilitated Joy Theater, the Saint Hotel, the Audubon Nature Institute's Audubon Insectarium, and the Astor Crowne Plaza. In October 2011, the New Orleans City Council granted final approval for the construction of 1031 Canal, a 190-foot (58 m) multi-use high-rise at the northeast intersection of Canal and North Rampart Streets. The building, under construction as a Hard Rock Hotel, was the site of a partial building and crane collapse on October 12, 2019.

After exiting downtown, Canal Street runs for its remaining length through the Mid-City neighborhood, part of which is now designated as BioDistrict New Orleans, a state-chartered economic development district created to encourage growth in the region's biomedical sector. Construction of two new teaching hospitals, the University Medical Center and a U.S. Department of Veterans Affairs regional facility, involving the expenditure of approximately $2 billion, is now underway in the BioDistrict.

In 2024, Sandra Herman and others founded a coalition called Celebrate Canal in order to help redevelop Canal Street.

== See also ==
- Downtown New Orleans
  - French Quarter
  - Central Business District
- Streetcars in New Orleans
- List of streets of New Orleans
