= Sophie B. Wright =

American educator

Sophie Bell Wright
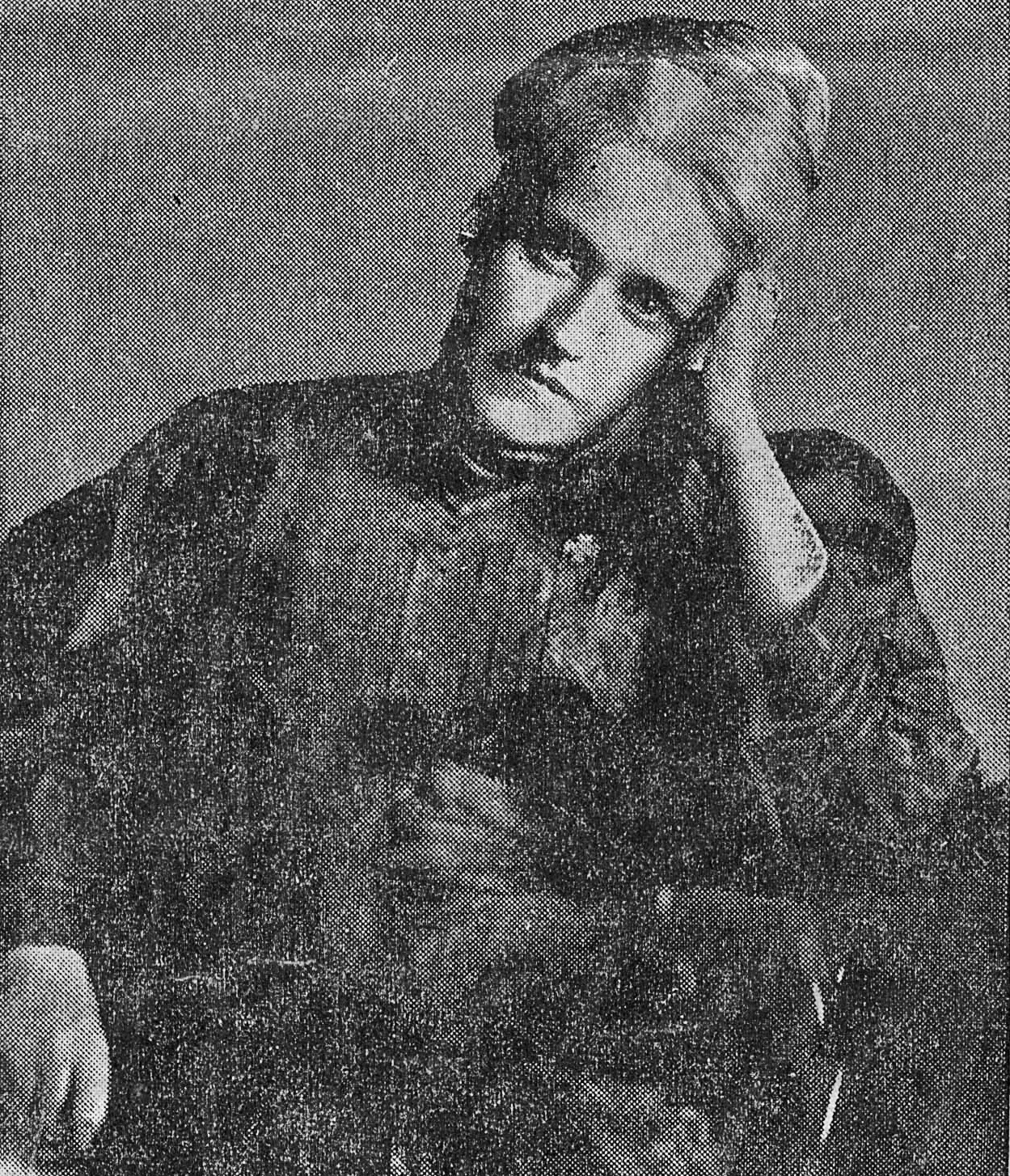
- Sophie Bell Wright, from a 1909 newspaper.
- Born: 5 June 1866; New Orleans
- Died: 10 June 1912 (aged 46); New Orleans
- Occupation(s): Educator, philanthropist

Sophie Bell Wright (June 5, 1866 – June 10, 1912) was an American educator from New Orleans, Louisiana. In recent years, Wright's membership in the Daughters of the Confederacy has led to calls for a reconsideration of her legacy.

== Early years ==
Wright was born in New Orleans, the daughter of William H. Wright, a Scottish immigrant, and Mary Bell Wright, from a Southern planter family. Her family was wealthy before the American Civil War, and her father was a Confederate States Army veteran. As a small child, Wright survived a fall with spinal and pelvic injuries that resulted in lifelong physical disabilities.

Unable to walk to school as a little girl, she was educated at home by her father, and showed an aptitude for mathematics. Eventually, she learned to use crutches and wore a back brace to attend school. She taught mathematics in exchange for her tuition at the Peabody Normal Seminary in New Orleans.

== Career ==
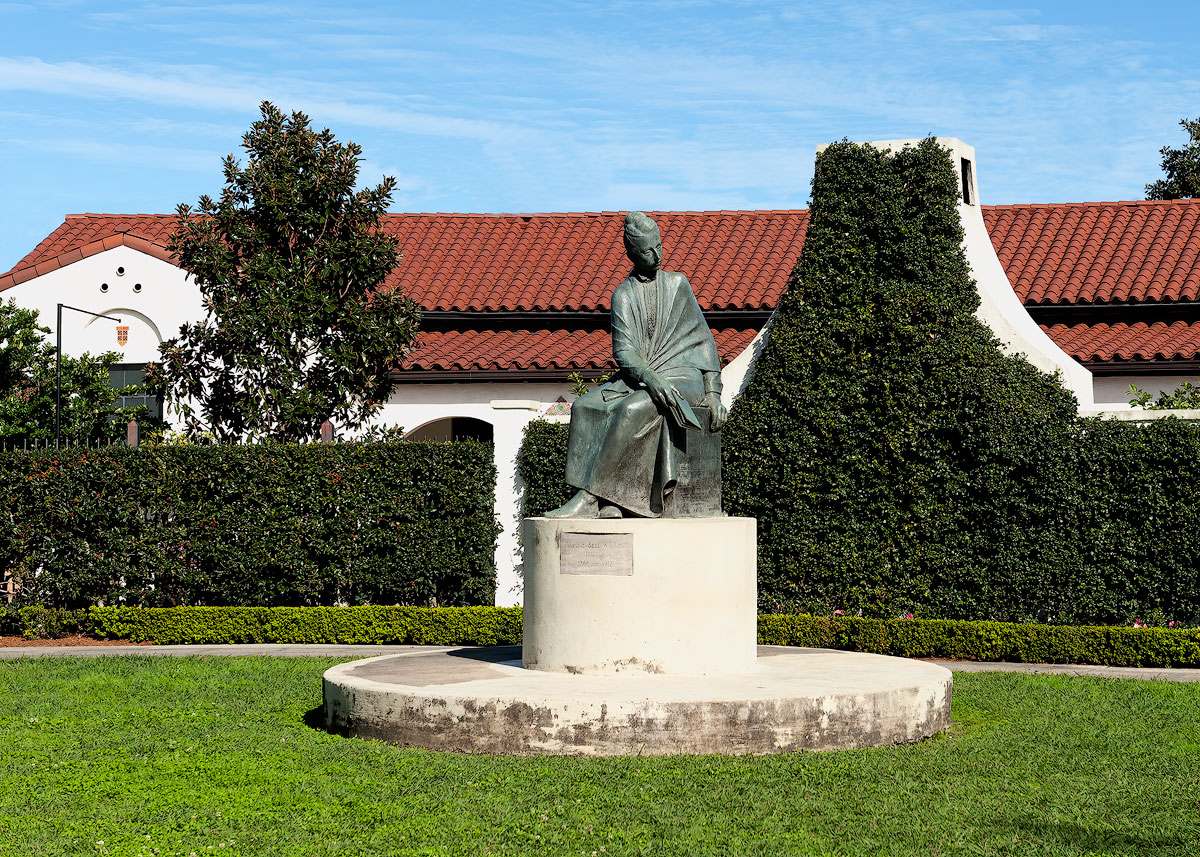
This statue of Wright by Enrique Alférez was erected in 1988.

In her teens, Wright began teaching, converting a room in her family's home into a classroom for day students. She started a boarding school, several free schools, and a very popular night school for working adults, with a faculty of forty teachers and hundreds of students.

Wright petitioned for a children's annex for the city's "Home for Incurables", and was president of the Home for Incurables. During the 1897 yellow fever epidemic, she spent all her money to turn her school into a storehouse, and distribute clothing, food, and medicine to the sick in her neighborhood. For this and other acts of sacrifice and charity, she was sometimes called "Saint Sophie."

Wright was also active in the prison reform movement, projects to build public playgrounds, and the Woman's Christian Temperance Union. She was president of the New Orleans Woman's Club, and published a collection of advice essays, Heart to Heart Talks (1908). She was honored by the National Congress of Mothers, and a leader in the International Order of the King's Daughters and Sons.

In 1903, Wright as the first woman to be awarded the Daily Picayune Loving Cup, given to New Orleans residents who exhibited outstanding philanthropy. Along with the award, she was given $10,000 to pay off her school's mortgage.

== Personal life ==
Wright died from heart disease at her home in New Orleans on June 10, 1912, aged 46 years, and was buried in Metairie Cemetery. New Orleans has a school and a street named after her, as well as a statue of her on Magazine Street.

== Controversy in 2020 ==
Though honored for her social activism and philanthropy during her lifetime, Wright's membership in the Daughters of the Confederacy led in 2020 to calls for a reconsideration of her legacy, and the removal of her monument in the Garden District of New Orleans.
