= Effects of Hurricane Laura in Louisiana =

Hurricane Laura
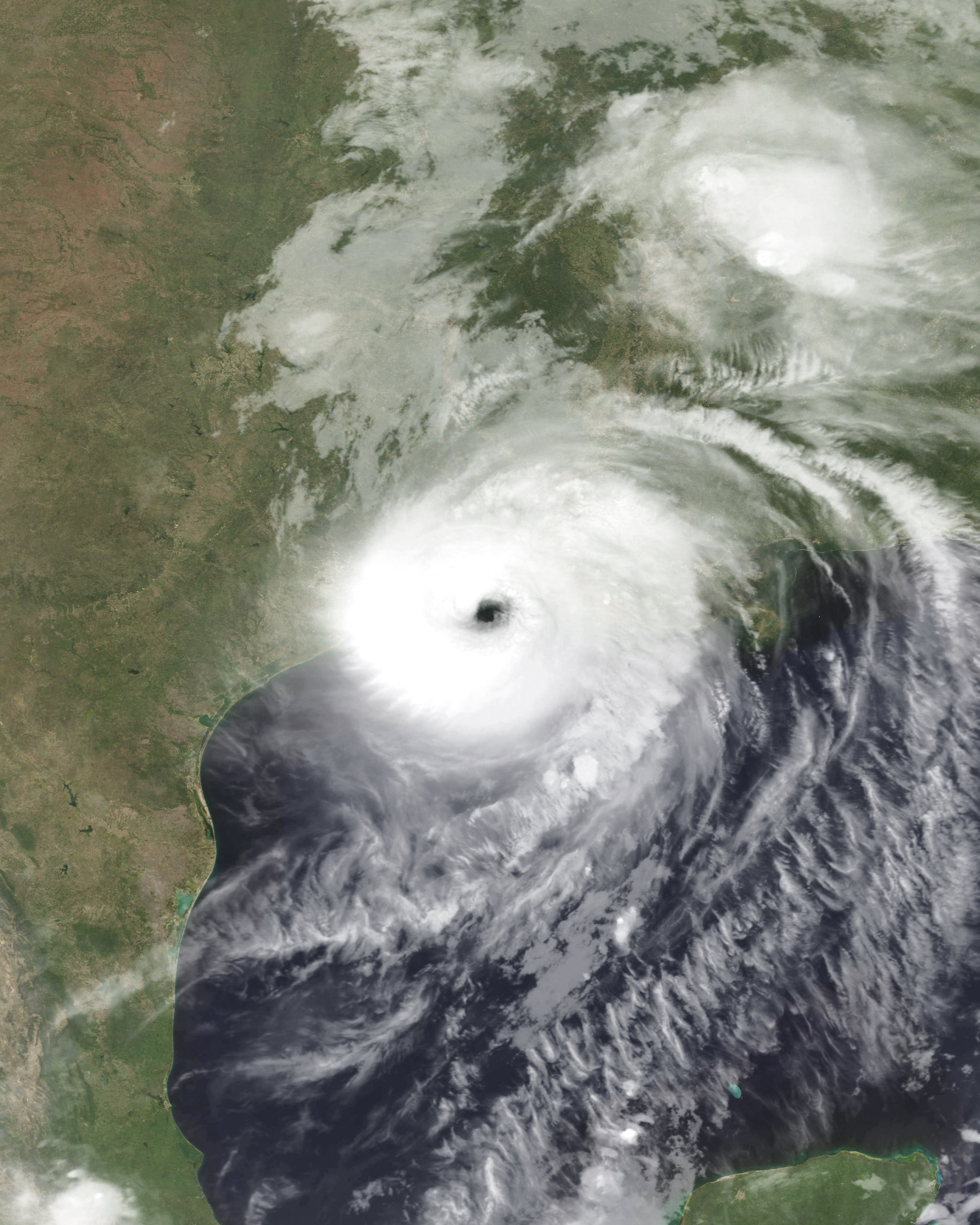
- Laura making landfall in Cameron, Louisiana near peak intensity early on August 27

Meteorological history
- Duration: August 26–28, 2020

Category 4 major hurricane
- 1-minute sustained (SSHWS/NWS)
- Highest winds: 150 mph (240 km/h)
- Lowest pressure: 939 mbar (hPa); 27.73 inHg

Overall effects
- Fatalities: 33
- Damage: $17.5 billion (2020 USD)
- Areas affected: Louisiana
- Part of the 2020 Atlantic hurricane season
- History: Meteorological history; Effects: Louisiana; Other wikis: Commons: Laura images

The effects of Hurricane Laura in Louisiana were extensive and historic. Laura was tied with the 1856 Last Island hurricane and Hurricane Ida as the strongest hurricane on record to make landfall in the U.S. state of Louisiana in terms of wind speed. It was the twelfth named storm, fourth hurricane, and first major hurricane of the extremely active 2020 Atlantic hurricane season. It made landfall on August 27, 2020 near Cameron, Louisiana as a Category 4 hurricane. Within Louisiana, the storm killed 33 people and caused around $17.5 billion in damage. Laura brought extremely high winds that ripped roofs off houses and brought a storm surge of up to 18 feet (5.5 m) to areas in Cameron Parish.

== Background ==
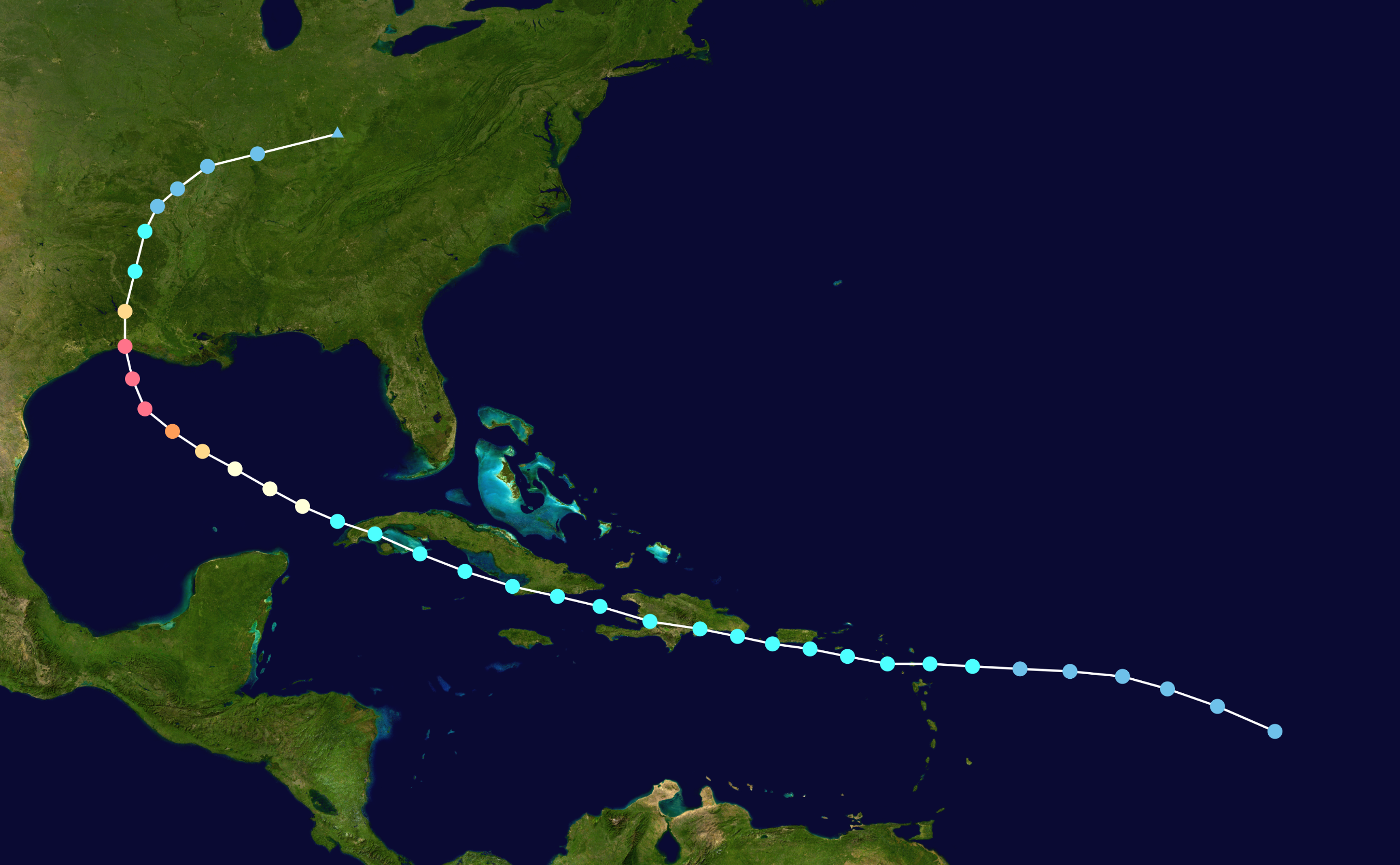
Map plotting the storm's track and intensity, according to the Saffir–Simpson scale Map key Saffir–Simpson scale Tropical depression (≤38 mph, ≤62 km/h) Tropical storm (39–73 mph, 63–118 km/h) Category 1 (74–95 mph, 119–153 km/h) Category 2 (96–110 mph, 154–177 km/h) Category 3 (111–129 mph, 178–208 km/h) Category 4 (130–156 mph, 209–251 km/h) Category 5 (≥157 mph, ≥252 km/h) Unknown Storm type Tropical cyclone Subtropical cyclone Extratropical cyclone, remnant low, tropical disturbance, or monsoon depression

Laura originated from a large tropical wave that moved off the West African coast on August 16 and became a tropical depression on August 20. Laura intensified into a tropical storm a day later, becoming the earliest twelfth named storm on record in the North Atlantic basin, forming eight days earlier than 1995's Hurricane Luis. Laura first hit the Lesser Antilles and brushed Puerto Rico as a tropical storm, then moved across the island of Hispaniola. The storm then moved across the length of Cuba. Subsequently, the outer rainbands extended into the Florida Keys and South Florida. Laura then moved across the Gulf of Mexico, strengthening slowly at first, before a period of rapid intensification on August 26. That day, Laura became a major hurricane, and later attained peak 1-minute sustained winds of 150 mph (240 km/h), making it a Category 4 hurricane. Early on August 27, Laura made landfall near peak intensity on Cameron, Louisiana. This was the tenth-strongest U.S. hurricane landfall by windspeed on record. After landfall, Laura rapidly weakened as it moved inland, becoming a tropical storm later that day, and weakening further to a tropical depression over Arkansas the next day. On August 29, Laura degenerated into a remnant low over Kentucky, before being absorbed into another extratropical storm near the East Coast of the U.S. shortly afterward.

== Preparations ==
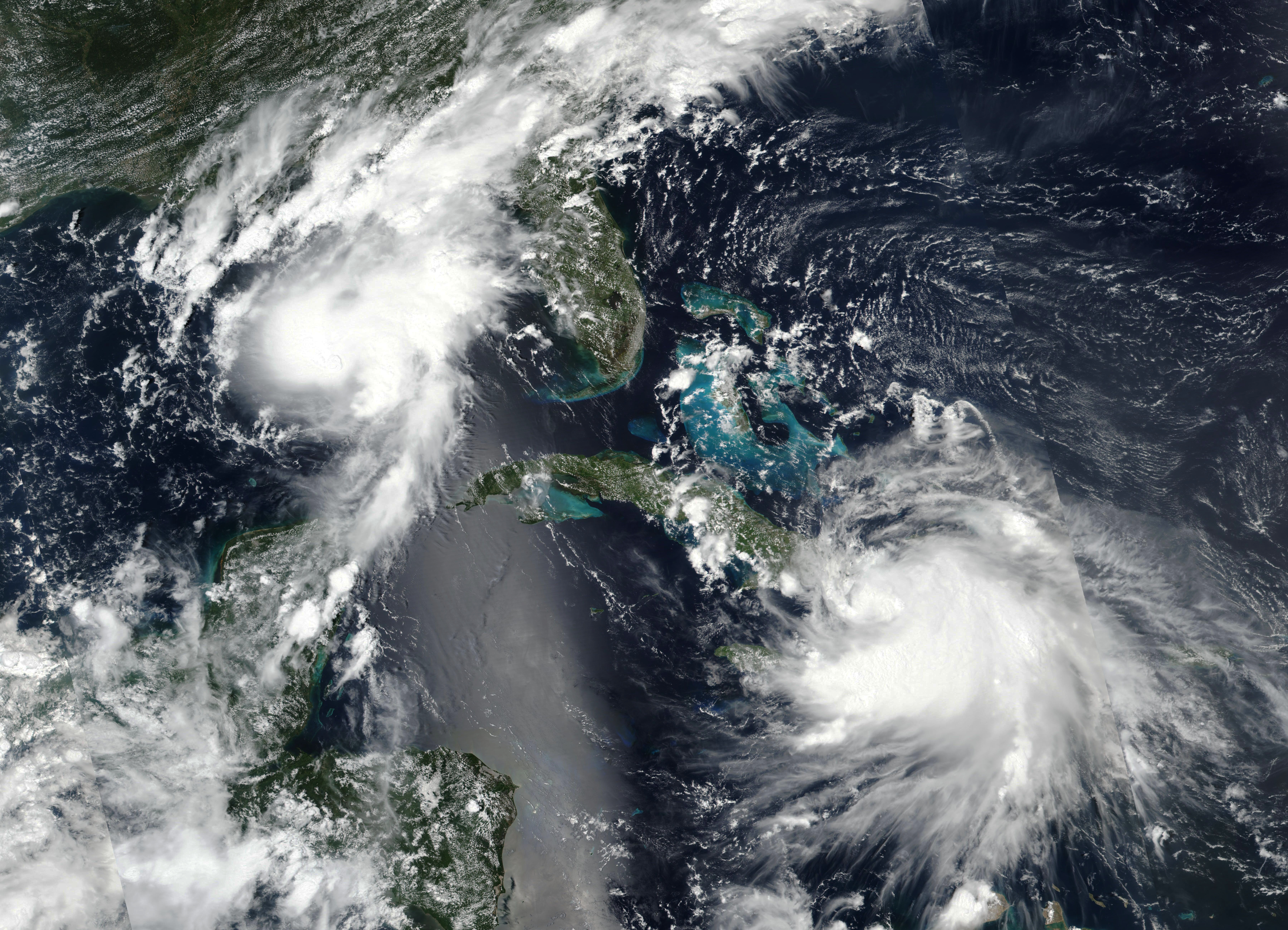
Hurricane Marco (left) and Tropical Storm Laura (right) on August 23. Both were threatening the Gulf Coast as hurricanes at the time, although Marco ultimately weakened.

The NHC first noted the possibility of Laura impacting the U.S. Gulf Coast on August 21, although they did not specifically mention Louisiana. At first, the predictions were that it would hit the Gulf Coast as a minimal hurricane, although the NHC noted there was a distinct possibility that it could be much stronger. As the days went by, it became increasingly likely that Laura would make landfall near or in Louisiana as a strong hurricane. Additionally, Tropical Storm Marco entered the Gulf of Mexico and strengthened into a minimal hurricane, creating concerns that two hurricanes would impact the Gulf Coast just days apart, although Marco ultimately weakened to a minimal tropical storm by the time it got very close to the coast. Hurricane, tropical storm, and storm surge watches were issued for almost the entire coastline on August 24. This came just hours after the southeastern portion of the state had their tropical storm and storm surge warnings for Marco cancelled. Most of the watches were upgraded to warnings the next day and a flash flood watch was also issued for the western half of the state as over 10 inches (250 mm) of rain was expected. As the threat of surge increased for the coastline, the NHC stated that there would be "unsurvivable storm surge with large and destructive waves." Three tornado watches were ultimately issued in all but the extreme northwestern part of the state. As Laura neared landfall, rare Extreme Wind Warnings were issued for Louisiana and Texas. These wind warnings are only issued when winds of above 110 miles per hour (180 km/h) are imminent or occurring in the area.

On August 21, Louisiana Governor John Bel Edwards declared a state of emergency for 36 parishes due to the concurrent threat of Hurricanes Marco and Laura. Evacuations related to Marco were in place for Plaquemines Parish, Jefferson Parish, Grand Isle, and Port Fourchon. A mandatory evacuation for the entirety of Calcasieu Parish, approximately 200,000 people, was ordered on August 25. State-run shelters were opened with cots spread farther apart due to the COVID-19 pandemic. Just hours before Laura made landfall on August 26, I-10 was shut down in both directions between the Louisiana/Texas border eastward to the Atchafalaya Basin.

== Impact ==
Numerous tornado warnings began to be issued throughout Louisiana as Laura approached the coast on August 26. An EF0 tornado touched down briefly Paincourtville, although no damage occurred. Another tornado was reportedly spotted by a trained spotter in Bell City, but was never confirmed. Coastal water rises began at around 19:00 UTC on August 26. The first report of sustained tropical-storm force winds on land was at Cypremort Point, on Vermilion Bay, where 45 mph (72 km/h) winds were recorded. Statewide, around 900,000 customers lost power due to the hurricane. Laura damaged 757,538 acres of timber throughout the state.

=== Cameron Parish ===
Hurricane Laura made landfall in Cameron, Louisiana on 06:00 UTC on August 27, 2020 as a Category 4 hurricane, with winds of 150 miles per hour (240 km/h) and a pressure of 939 mb. Widespread power outages were reported near the landfall point in Cameron. Near Cameron, a wind gust of 127 miles per hour (204 km/h) was recorded at Calcasieu Pass, which saw at least 9.19 feet (2.80 m) of storm surge. At Holly Beach, a wind gust to 153 miles per hour (246 km/h) was measured. Holly Beach was extensively damaged as an RV was destroyed and several homes suffered roof damage. Storm surge flooding also covered SH 82. The town of Hackberry was severely damaged by storm surge flooding and two trains were derailed in Grand Lake, where the Grand Lake High School suffered damage.

=== Lake Charles ===
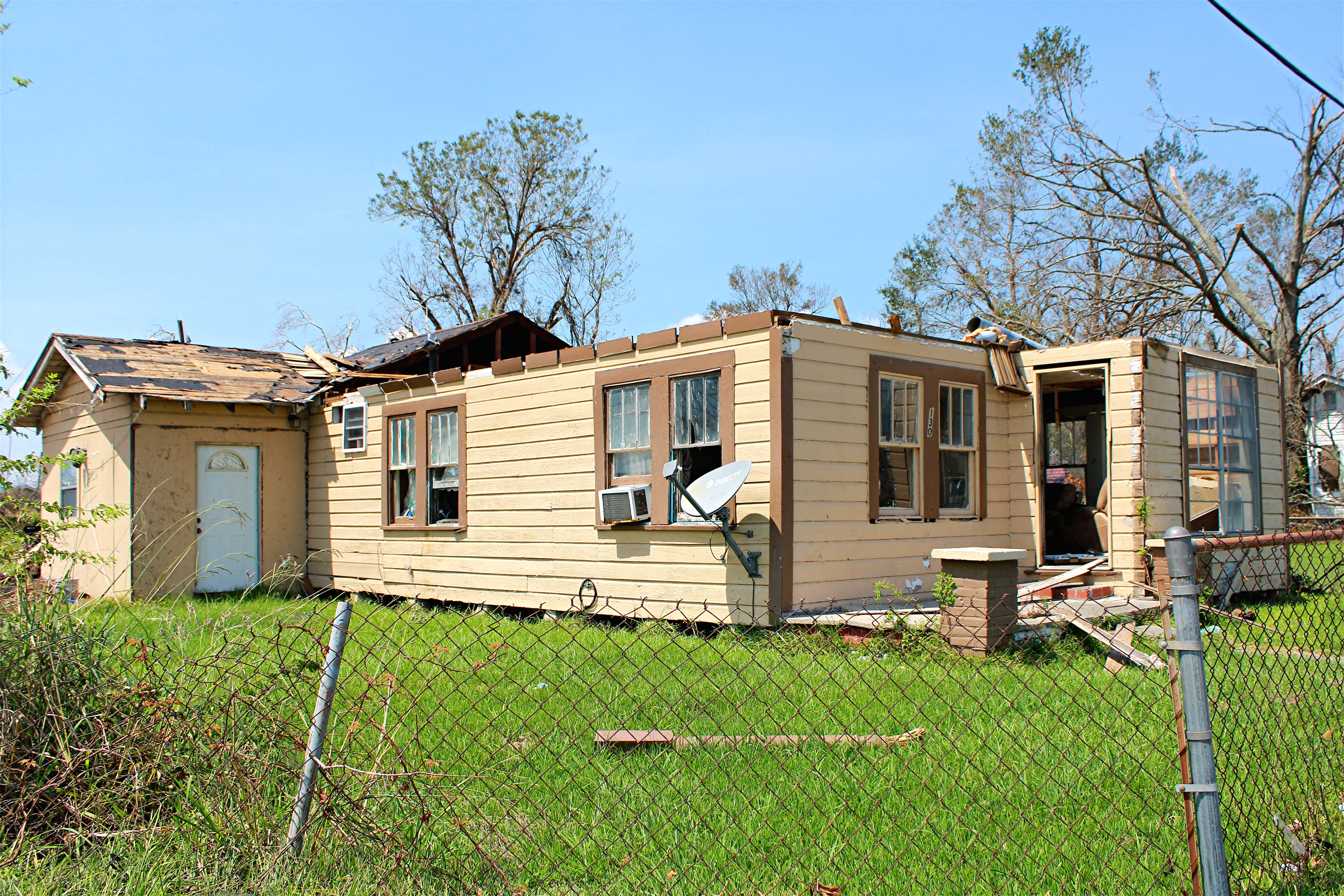
A damaged house with no roof in Lake Charles

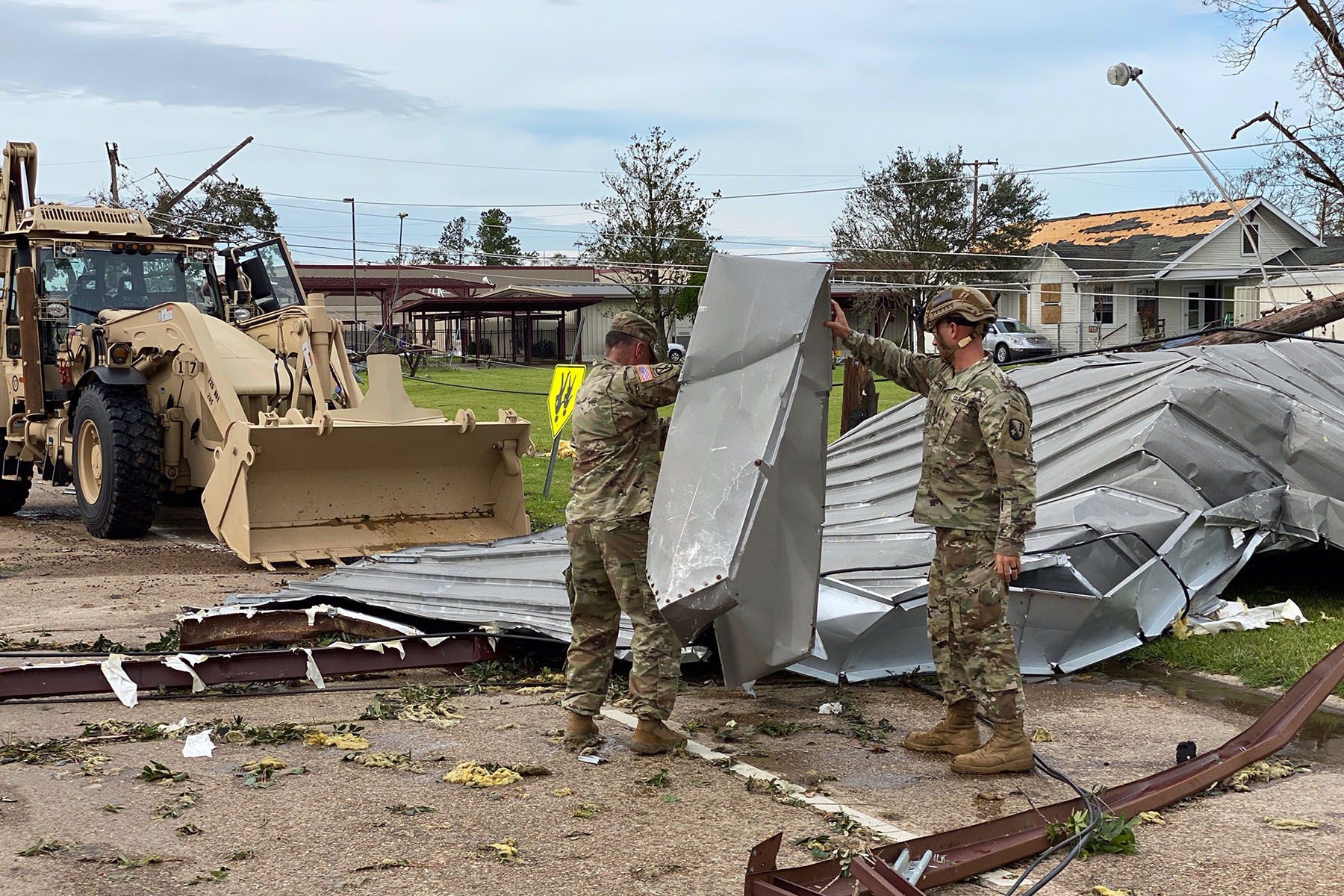
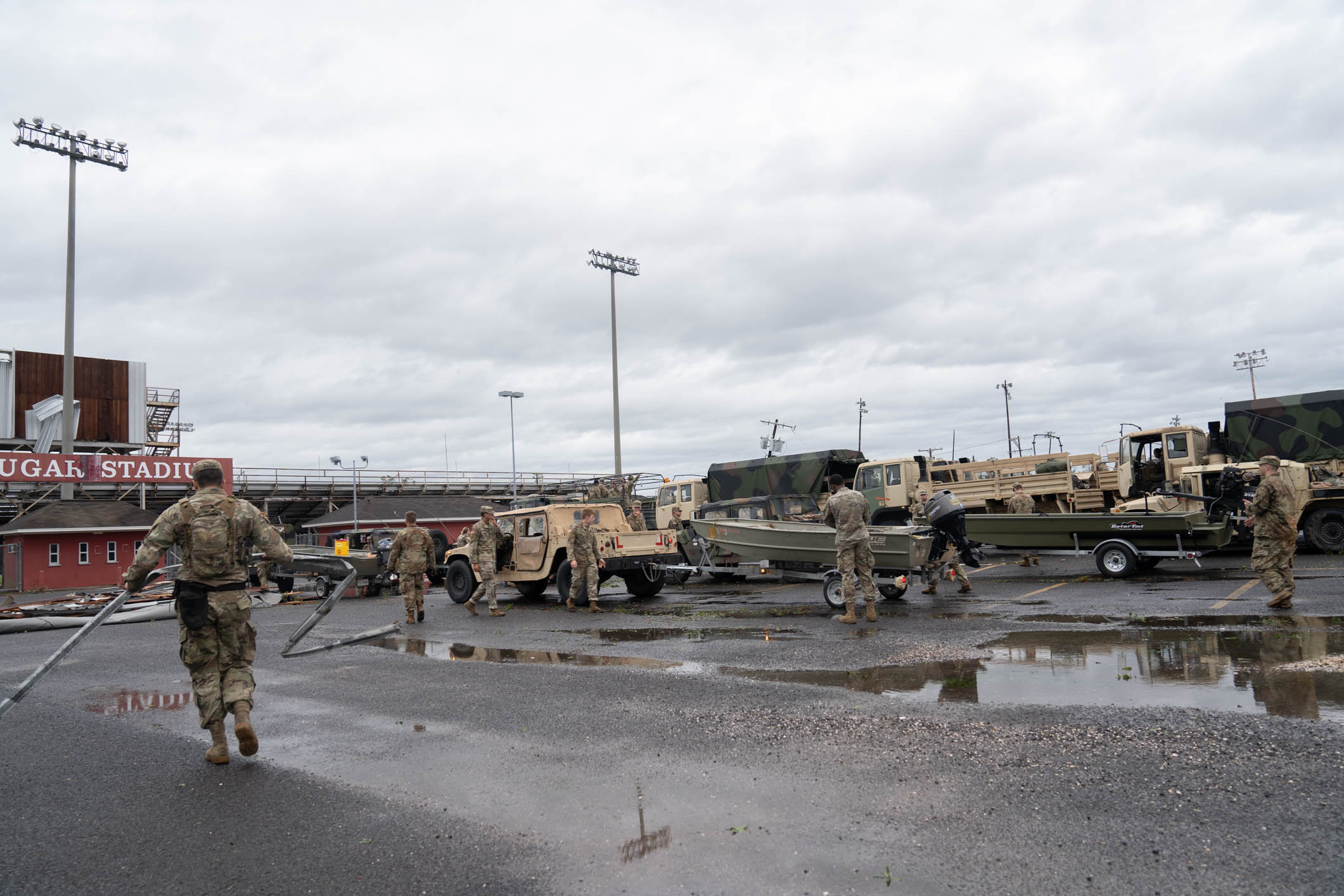
Members of the Louisiana National Guard assessing storm damage in Lake Charles

Though all of Calcasieu Parish saw extensive impact from Hurricane Laura, it was most obvious in the parish seat of Lake Charles and its nearby 'satellite' communities, with widespread catastrophic-level damage to residential and commercial building roofs and structure, as well as half of all matured trees either blown down, badly stripped of branches, or 'broken over'. Double- and Triple-KVA (kilovolt-amp) power transmission towers and lines feeding power throughout the area were heavily damaged and/or destroyed. An RV was blown over and many mobile homes in parks were knocked off of their mounts, some rolled over, older ones stripped of their siding and gutted. The Lake Charles Regional Airport saw a wind gust of 133 miles per hour (214 km/h) before the instrument was destroyed. Several Texas Tech sticknet instruments reported high winds, including a gust to 124 miles per hour (200 km/h) at a height of 2.25 metres (7.4 ft).

Another wind gust in the city reached 137 miles per hour (220 km/h). Many windows were blown out of Capital One Tower in Downtown Lake Charles. The tower stood empty afterwards for several years until it was demolished in 2024. A communications tower collapsed onto the KPLC studio building (which had been evacuated ahead of the storm) and a portion of a skybridge was blown out. The radar at the NWS Lake Charles forecast office (which had its staff evacuate in advance of the storm, and the office's operations being transferred in the interim to the NWS office in Brownsville, Texas) was destroyed around the time of landfall, with its dome and much of its internal equipment sheared from the radar tower's base. Multiple hangars at Lake Charles Regional Airport were destroyed. Farrar Hall at McNeese State University also suffered damage, and a Motel 6 building partially collapsed. A chlorine leak caused a large chemical fire on the west side of Lake Charles, and several freight cars were derailed on the east side of the city. A railroad crossing cantilever was also knocked down.

=== Elsewhere ===
Intracoastal City saw a storm surge of 6 feet (1.8 m). Storm surge also flooded over SH 317 at Burns Point in St. Mary Parish, and flash flooding surrounded homes in Abbeville.

Elsewhere, power flashes were seen in Sulphur, where a hotel was damaged. Extensive structural damage also occurred in Vinton, and a salon was destroyed in Westlake. Softwood trees were blown down in Fort Polk and the roof of a home collapsed in Alexandria after a tree fell on it. More than 70 trees fell in the Alexandria Zoological Park, damaging 20 animal habitats, including destroying the cougar enclosure; however, no animals were injured during the storm. The NWS radar at Fort Polk also suffered a communication outage, causing it to go down. A home in Carlyss had its roof and entire back room ripped off while another home was damaged in New Llano after a carport was blown into it. There was extensive damage to trees, power lines and poles, and structures in De Quincy and much of the town of Delcambre was left underwater due to flooding. The roof of a Market Basket store in Welsh and Hicks High School in Lacamp was blown off. A tree was blown down onto a fraternity house in Lafayette.

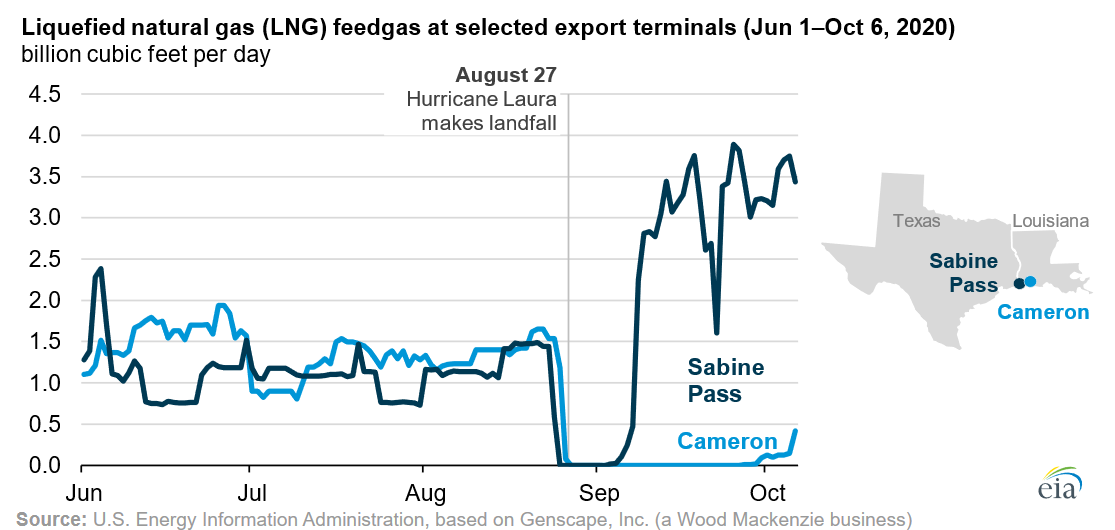
Impact of landfall on natural gas exports in western Louisiana

Farther inland, a mesonet near Calvin measured a wind gust of 70 miles per hour (110 km/h). Trees and power lines were blown down all over the cities of Mansfield and Shreveport. In the latter city, a tree fell on a house, injuring a person inside while another tree fell on a vehicle. Multiple roads throughout Shreveport had to be closed due to the widespread tree damage. In Monroe, trees and parking light poles were downed and metal roofing was blown off of multiple buildings. Widespread flooding was reported in Natchitoches Parish, where I-49 had to be closed past SH 174 west of Powhatan due to a downed tree. In Natchitoches, utility poles were snapped and broken and power lines were blown down on a business on SH 1. The police station in Robeline had its roof ripped off to go with the numerous downing of large trees throughout the town. In Shreveport, a large tree was blown down on the Centenary College of Louisiana campus while several homes were damaged by falling trees south-southwest of the city. In Greenwood, flash flooding led to high water over the shoulder roads of I-20 at exit 5 with drivers being advised to use US 80 as an alternative. In Jena, multiple trees were blown down on homes and vehicles and power lines were downed all over town. At Rutherford Beach, a 17-foot storm surge was measured ranking it as one of the highest storm surges on the gulf coast. The storm also caused the largest power outage in Baton Rouge since Isaac in 2012.

=== Fatalities ===
A total of 33 fatalities occurred throughout the state with four of them coming from falling trees. They included a 14-year-old girl in Vernon Parish, a 68-year-old man in Acadia Parish, a 51-year-old man in Jackson Parish, and a 64-year-old man in Allen Parish. Carbon monoxide poisoning from generators being inside homes, which is strongly discouraged, led to the deaths of 12 people in Calcasieu Parish and two people in Allen Parish. Another man died of drowning while aboard a sinking boat during the storm. Finally, one person died in Calcasieu Parish in a house fire, four people died in Calcasieu Parish, Natchitoches Parish, and Rapides Parish during the cleanup process, and eight others died in Beauregard Parish, Grant Parish, Rapides Parish, and Vernon Parish due to heat-related illnesses following the loss of electricity.

== Aftermath ==
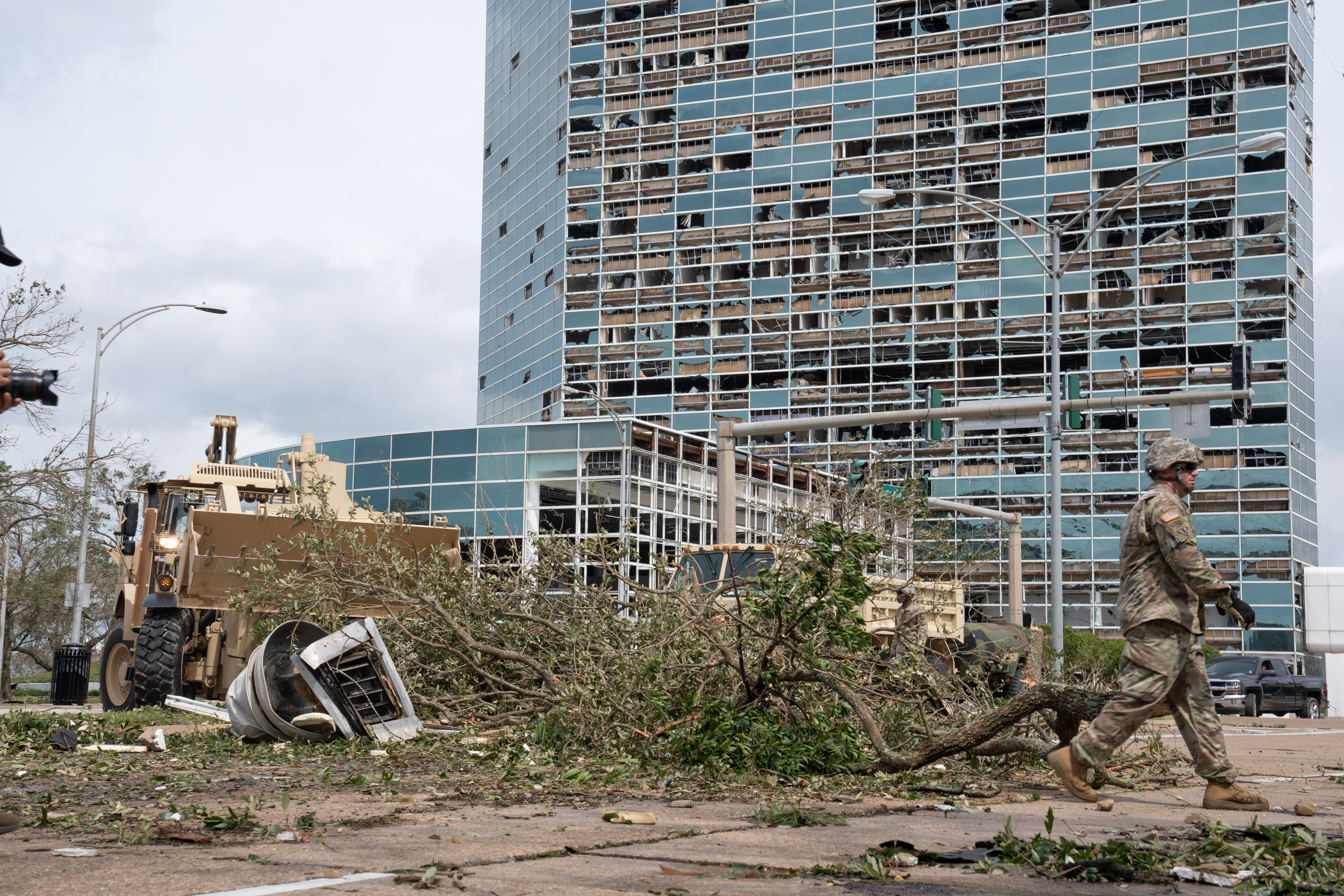
National Guard troops respond in the aftermath of Hurricane Laura in Lake Charles. The Capital One Tower in the background had many of its windows blown out.

The governors of both Texas and Louisiana surveyed storm damage in the hardest hit parts of their respective states after the storm had passed. Roads in both Calcasieu and Cameron Parishes in Louisiana were impassable, cutting off road access to both Cameron and Creole. About 200,000 people were left without drinking water after Laura made 80 water systems inoperable. Additionally, some areas saw complete destruction in their power grids, and over a million people lost power. Some areas were expected to be without power for weeks or even months. Multiple homes also were uninhabitable due to air conditioning units being destroyed. Recovery efforts were brought to a halt by additional rainfall in the days after Laura had passed.

After the storm, President Donald Trump approved a post-storm major disaster declaration for 23 parishes in Louisiana on August 27. Two days later, he visited the areas most heavily affected by the storm, including Lake Charles in Calcasieu Parish, and Orange County. Trump visited the Cajun Navy, a rescue organization, and met with Governor John Bel Edwards.

Post-storm assessments indicated extensive damage and losses to Louisiana's timber industry with some small private forest landowners reporting complete loss of their timber acreage, an outcome which they had not experienced in the aftermath of Hurricane Rita, 15 years earlier. Extensive damage was also reported to Louisiana's industrial facilities with one-third showing some type of damage and nine out of the 138 facilities showing critical damage, causing environmental concerns. Some of the most critically damaged facilities were the BioLab facility and the Equistar Chemicals facility in Westlake, and the Chemical Waste Management facility and the Lotte Chemical plant in Lake Charles.

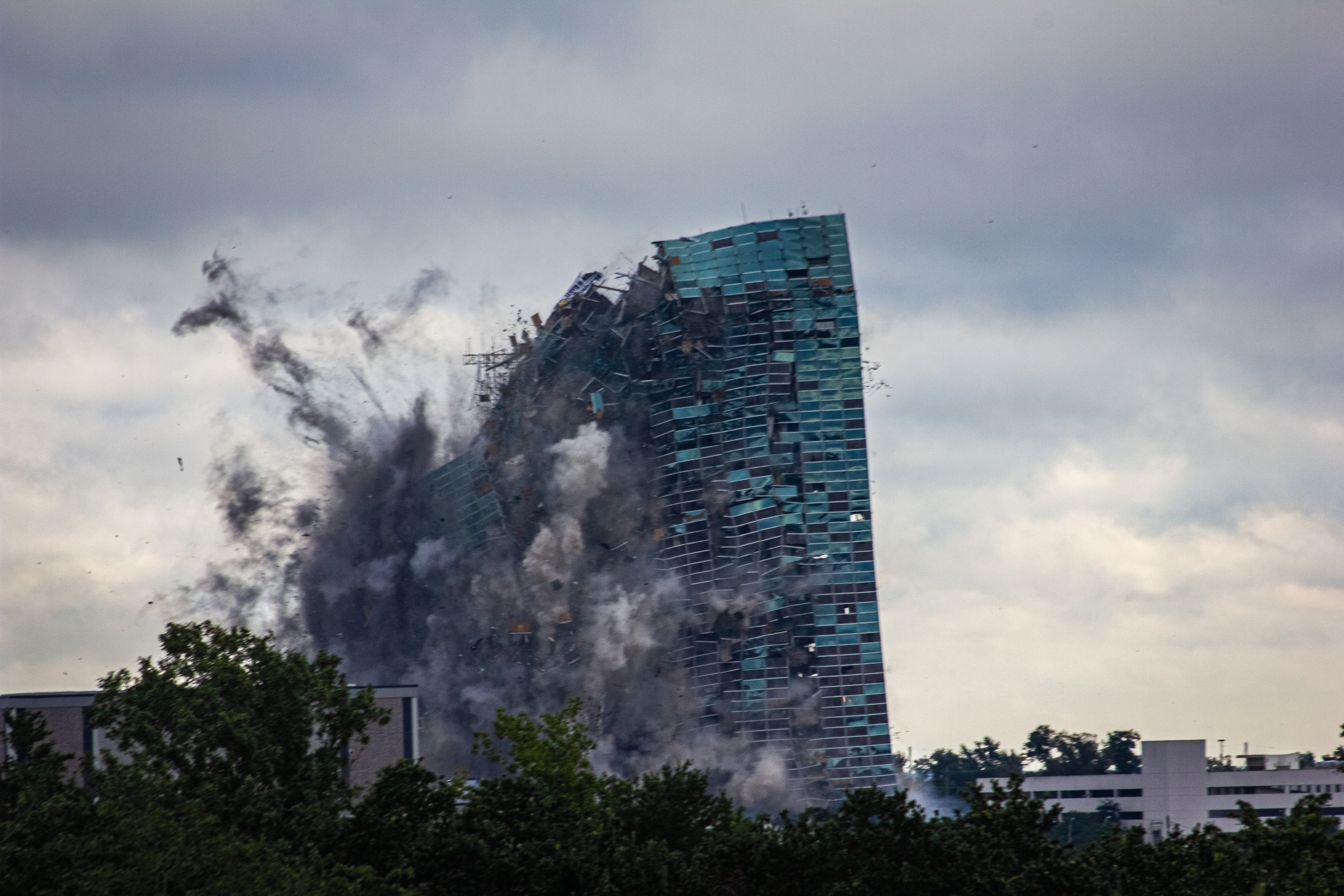
Demolition of the Capital One Tower on September 7, 2024

Many of the repairs in Louisiana were undone six weeks later by Hurricane Delta, which made landfall just 12 miles (19 km) east of where Hurricane Laura did, with many areas in and around hard-hit Lake Charles being damaged again.

In the aftermath of the storm, the Capital One Tower stood vacant until the owners decided to demolish the building. On September 7, 2024, the skyscraper was imploded by a demolition crew after the property's owners, Hertz Investment Group, settled with the building's insurance provider, Zurich Insurance Group, for an undisclosed amount. The $7 million demolition was funded by private money secured by the Lake Charles city government. The future of the property remains uncertain.

== See also ==
- List of Louisiana hurricanes (2000–present)
- History of Lake Charles, Louisiana
