= Hurricane Laura =

Category 4 Atlantic hurricane in 2020

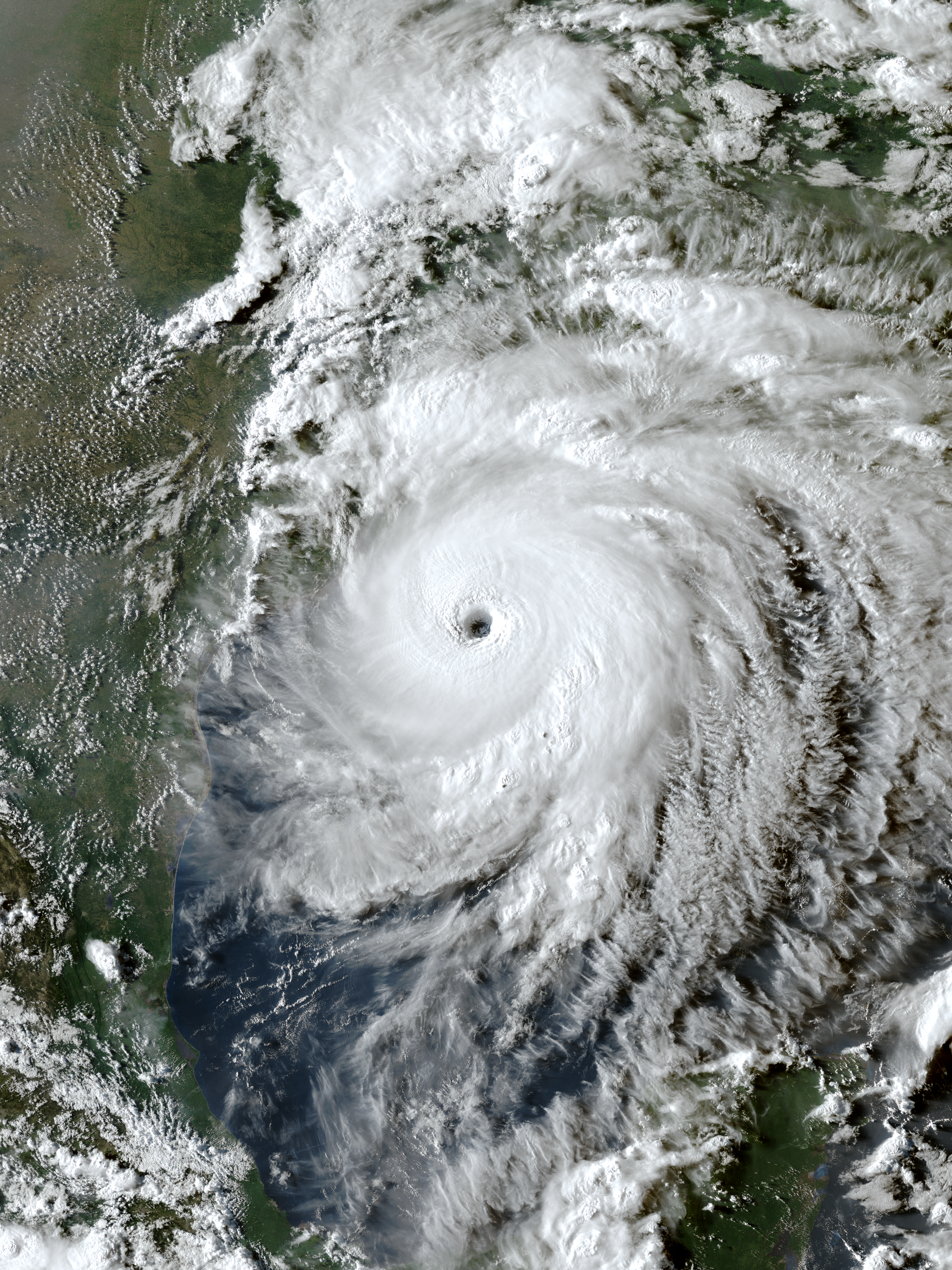
- Hurricane Laura near peak intensity while approaching Louisiana late on August 26

Meteorological history
- Formed: August 20, 2020
- Dissipated: August 29, 2020

Category 4 major hurricane
- 1-minute sustained (SSHWS/NWS)
- Highest winds: 150 mph (240 km/h)
- Lowest pressure: 937 mbar (hPa); 27.67 inHg

Overall effects
- Fatalities: 81 (47 direct, 34 indirect)
- Damage: ≥$23.3 billion (2020 USD)
- Areas affected: Lesser Antilles, Greater Antilles, The Bahamas, Gulf Coast of the United States, Midwestern United States, Eastern United States
- IBTrACS
- Part of the 2020 Atlantic hurricane season
- History: Meteorological history; Effects: Louisiana; Other wikis: Commons: Laura images

Hurricane Laura was a deadly and destructive tropical cyclone that is tied with the 1856 Last Island hurricane and 2021's Hurricane Ida as the strongest hurricane on record to make landfall in the U.S. state of Louisiana, as measured by maximum sustained winds. The twelfth named storm, fourth hurricane, and first of seven major hurricanes of the record-breaking 2020 Atlantic hurricane season, Laura originated from a large tropical wave that moved off the West African coast on August 16 and became a tropical depression on August 20. Laura intensified into a tropical storm a day later, becoming the earliest twelfth named storm on record in the North Atlantic basin, forming eight days earlier than 1995's Hurricane Luis.

Laura first hit the Lesser Antilles and brushed Puerto Rico as a tropical storm, then moved across the island of Hispaniola, killing 31 people in Haiti and four in the Dominican Republic. The storm then moved across the length of Cuba, prompting tropical storm warnings and the evacuation of more than 260,000 people there. Subsequently, the outer rainbands extended into the Florida Keys and South Florida. Laura then moved across the Gulf of Mexico, strengthening slowly at first, before a period of rapid intensification on August 26. That day, Laura became a major hurricane, and later attained its peak 1-minute sustained winds of 150 mph (240 km/h), making it a Category 4 hurricane. The approaching storm prompted the issuing of many warnings and watches for Louisiana, as well as the evacuation of many people.

Early on August 27, Laura made landfall near peak intensity on Cameron, Louisiana. Measured by windspeed, Laura was the tenth-strongest U.S. hurricane on record to made landfall in the U.S. The effects of Laura across Louisiana were devastating. Nearly 10-foot high storm surge was recorded in Cameron Parish. Numerous parishes had severe flooding and extreme damage to houses. Several roads had to be closed, and drivers were advised to use different routes. The storm caused the deaths of 30 people in the state alone. Texas and Arkansas were struck notably hard as well. The storm caused the deaths of at least 41 people in the United States. An estimated $23.3 billion in damages was inflicted on southwestern Louisiana and southeastern Texas near the Gulf of Mexico.

After landfall, Laura caused significant wind damage in southwest and central Louisiana before becoming a tropical storm later that day. It weakened further to a tropical depression over Arkansas the next day. On August 29, Laura degenerated into a remnant low over Kentucky, before being absorbed into another extratropical storm near the East Coast of the U.S. shortly afterward. Overall, Laura caused more than $23.3 billion in damage and 81 deaths. Areas that were affected by Laura, namely the Gulf Coast, were affected again six weeks later by Hurricane Delta.

== Meteorological history ==
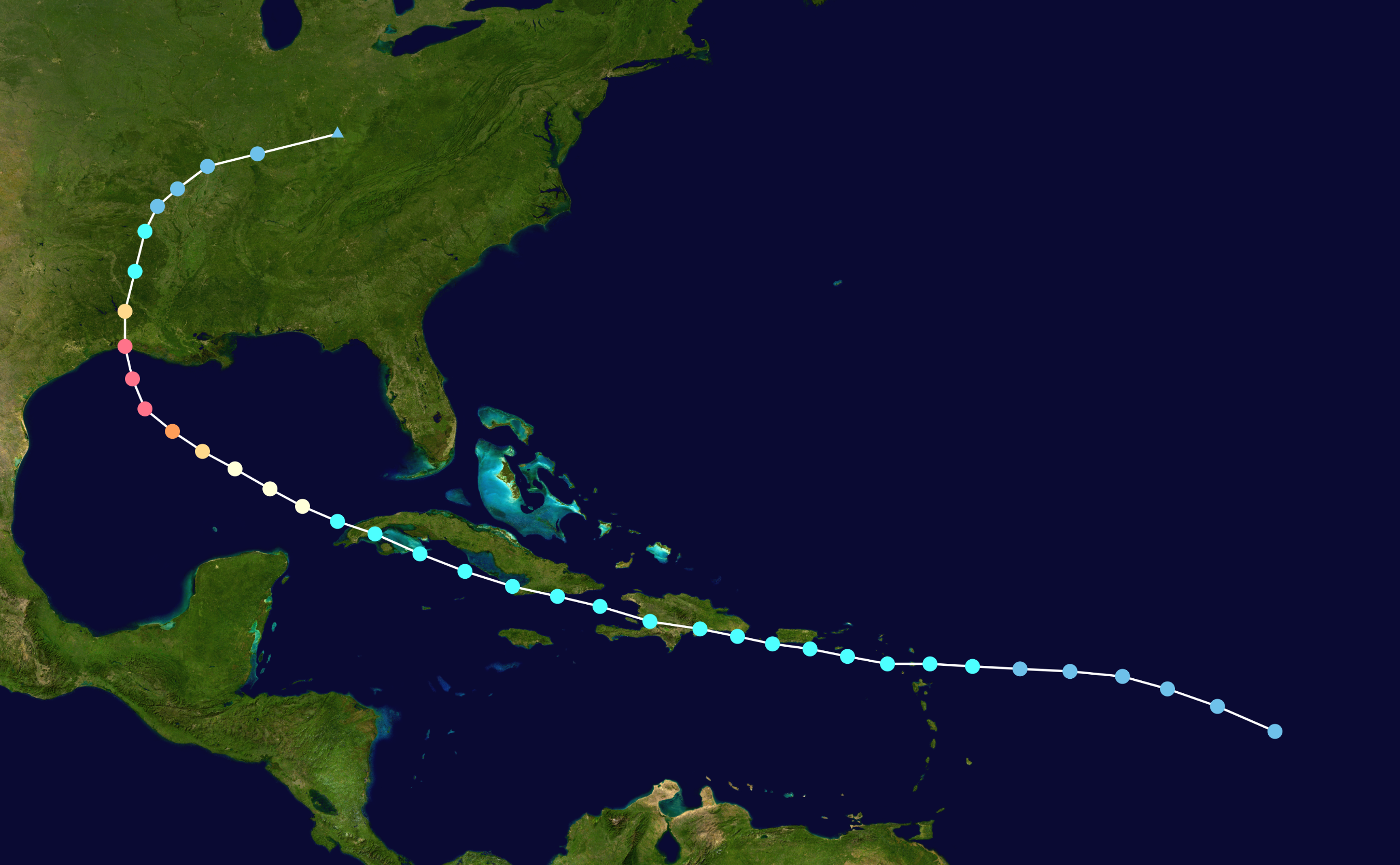
Map plotting the storm's track and intensity, according to the Saffir–Simpson scale Map key Saffir–Simpson scale Tropical depression (≤38 mph, ≤62 km/h) Tropical storm (39–73 mph, 63–118 km/h) Category 1 (74–95 mph, 119–153 km/h) Category 2 (96–110 mph, 154–177 km/h) Category 3 (111–129 mph, 178–208 km/h) Category 4 (130–156 mph, 209–251 km/h) Category 5 (≥157 mph, ≥252 km/h) Unknown Storm type Tropical cyclone Subtropical cyclone Extratropical cyclone, remnant low, tropical disturbance, or monsoon depression

On August 16, 2020, a tropical wave along the eastern end of a monsoon trough emerged off the west coast of Africa over the Atlantic Ocean. At this time, the National Hurricane Center (NHC) noted the possibility of tropical cyclogenesis over the next five days as environmental conditions gradually became more favorable for development. The system produced disorganized convection over a broad area and steadily consolidated. A surface low accompanied by organizing banding features coalesced about 700 mi (1,100 km) west-southwest of the Cape Verde islands. By 03:00 UTC on August 20, the low and accompanying convection became sufficiently organized to be classified as a tropical depression, the thirteenth of the season, about 1,035 mi (1,666 km) east-southeast of the Leeward Islands. The depression moved briskly west-northwest in response to the Bermuda High to the north, a high that would steer the system throughout its lifetime. After struggling to intensify for over a day, the depression center reformed and an increase in organization and the presence of tropical storm-force winds prompted an upgrade to tropical storm status and storm was named Laura. This marked the earliest classification of a season's twelfth named storm since reliable records began in 1851, surpassing the previous record set by Hurricane Luis, on August 28, 1995. Moderate wind shear hampered further development through August 22, displacing the bulk of convection east of the surface circulation. Early on August 22, Laura traversed the Virgin Islands and sideswiped Puerto Rico to the south before making landfall in the southeastern Dominican Republic with maximum sustained winds of 50 miles per hour (80 km/h) early on August 23.

Tropical Storm Laura over Cuba as seen from International Space Station

Despite interacting with the mountainous terrain of Hispaniola, the overall structure of Laura actually improved with little intensity loss. Laura subsequently traversed Haiti and emerged over the Windward Passage. Once back over water, the storm intensified some and made a brief landfall around 00:00 UTC on August 24 in Santiago de Cuba Province, Cuba, with winds of 60–65 mph (97–105 km/h) before emerging over the Caribbean along Cuba's southern coast. Laura's structure briefly degraded on August 24 before it reorganized and traversed Pinar del Río Province in western Cuba, early on August 25. Maintaining a west-northwest trajectory, Laura entered the southeastern Gulf of Mexico and quickly organized throughout August 25, reaching hurricane-strength by 12:15 UTC. After moving out of an area of dry air, the hurricane began a period of rapid intensification on August 26. The storm grew in size and featured a well-defined eye surrounded by increasingly symmetric deep convection. By 12:00 UTC, Laura strengthened into a Category 3 hurricane on the Saffir–Simpson scale before becoming a Category 4 hurricane six hours later. Continuing to strengthen into August 27, Laura reached its peak intensity of 150 miles per hour (240 km/h), a high-end Category 4 hurricane, and a minimum pressure of 937 mbar (hPa; 27.67 inHg). At this time, the hurricane turned north toward the Texas–Louisiana coastline within a weakness along the western edge of the Bermuda High.

Animated loop of Laura making landfall near Cameron, Louisiana, early on August 27 from the Lake Charles (KLCH) radar, before it failed at 12:53 a.m CDT (05:53 UTC).

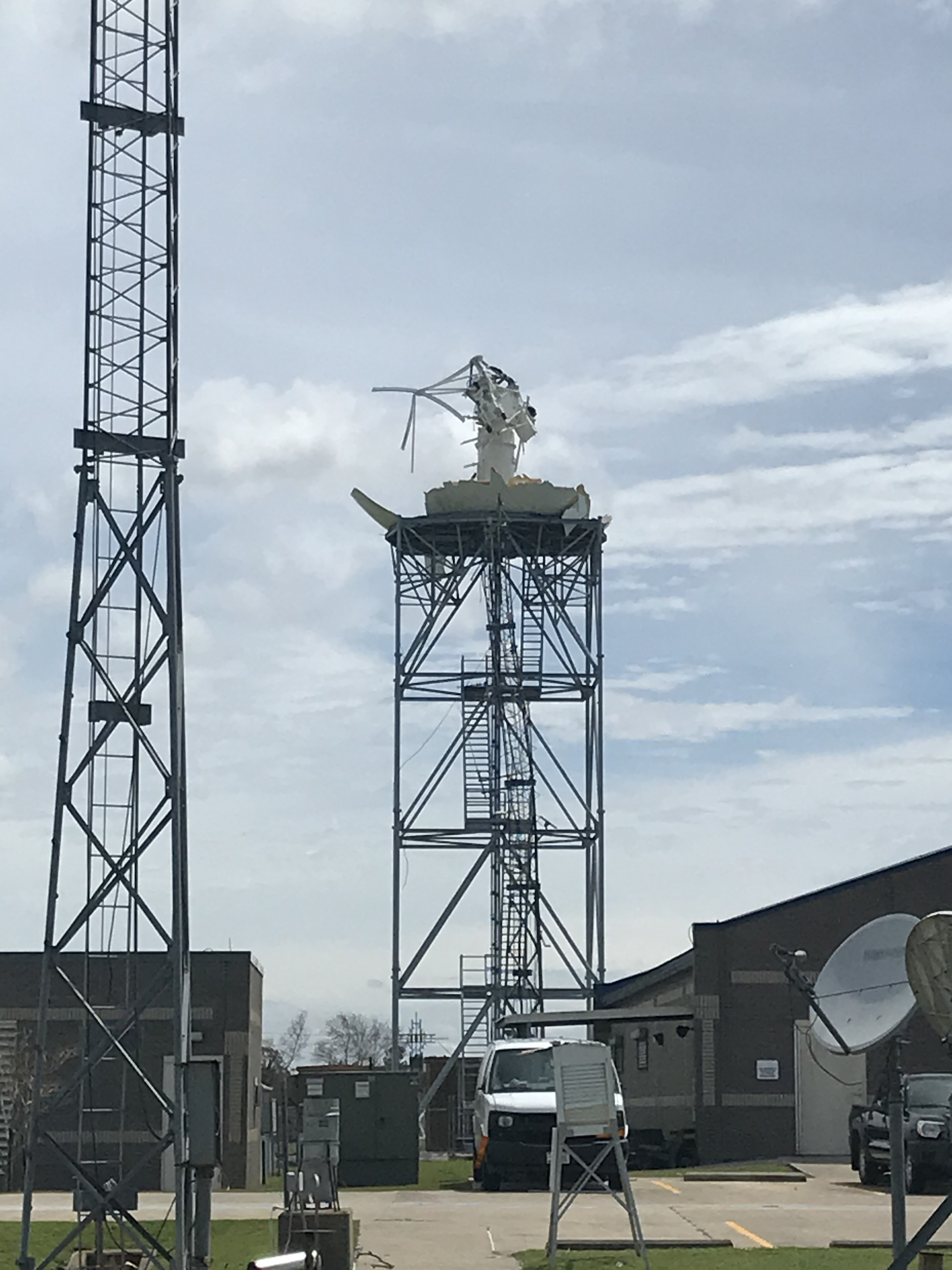
The radar after Laura.

Little change in intensity took place in the few hours before Hurricane Laura made landfall near Cameron, Louisiana, around 06:00 UTC on August 27 near peak strength, as its pressure had risen by 2 mbar. Laura matched the strength of the 1856 Last Island hurricane for strongest landfall in the state and was the first Category 4 landfall on record in southwestern Louisiana. Progressing inland across southwestern Louisiana, Laura produced destructive winds over a wide area, although the storm rapidly weakened as it progressed farther inland. Steady filling of the storm and the disappearance of its eye ensued throughout the day, and Laura weakened to a tropical storm by 17:00 UTC about 50 miles (80 km) east-southeast of Shreveport. Maintaining tropical storm-force winds, the system progressed into southwestern Arkansas. By August 28, Laura degraded to a tropical depression over central Arkansas; heavy rain became the primary threat across the Southeast. Around that time, the NHC issued their final advisory on Laura, passing on the responsibility for issuing advisories to the Weather Prediction Center (WPC). Gradually losing tropical characteristics, the weakening storm accelerated east-northeast within the mid-latitude westerlies. The system ultimately degenerated into a remnant low over Kentucky early on August 29, as it began merging with an approaching extratropical storm. Laura's remnant low continued moving eastward, before being absorbed into the approaching extratropical system several hours later over Maryland.

== Preparations ==
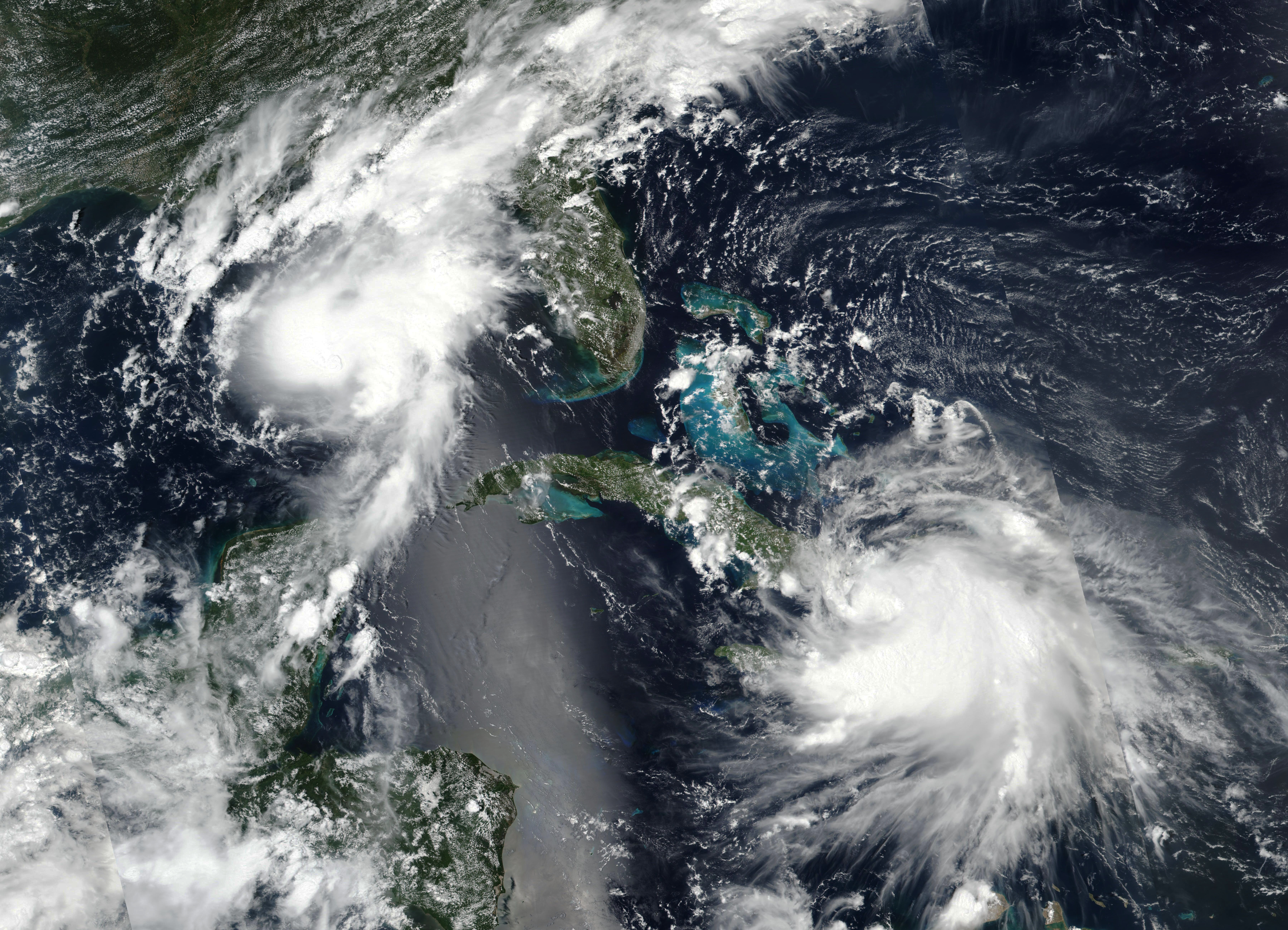
Hurricane Marco (left) and Tropical Storm Laura (right) on August 23.

=== Lesser Antilles and Virgin Islands ===
In preparation for the storm, schools were closed in Anguilla and Antigua. A tropical storm watch was issued for several islands in the group on August 20, being upgraded to a warning the next day. The storm prompted the closing of all ports in the British Virgin Islands.

=== Dominican Republic ===
A tropical storm warning was issued covering the coast from Punta Palenque to the northern Haitian border. A red alert was also issued for 18 provinces, a yellow alert for 8, and a green alert for 6.

=== Haiti ===
Haitian authorities urged people to evacuate to shelters, and to remember to wear masks and respect social distancing orders in the areas due to the COVID-19 pandemic.

=== Jamaica and Cayman Islands ===
Although the center of Laura was forecast to remain north of Jamaica, associated rainbands on the southern side of the circulation were anticipated to bring significant precipitation. On August 23, the Jamaican Meteorological Service issued a flash flood watch for low-lying areas nationwide. This was later upgraded to a flash flood warning on August 24 as torrential rains affected the nation.

Originally, the bulk of the storm was forecasted to stay north of the Cayman Islands, but as the forecast kept on shifting further southwest of earlier forecast, the projections of significant precipitation and for Tropical Storm conditions continued to increase. The Cayman Islands Government issued Tropical Storm Warning for their Islands on August 23. This was in addition to the Severe Weather Statements and Flood Warnings that were already posted.

=== Cuba ===
Ahead of Laura's first landfall in Cuba on August 23, tropical storm watches and warnings were issued throughout the nation. At one point, the western tip of Cuba was under both a tropical storm watch from Laura and a tropical storm warning from Hurricane Marco at the same time. Officials evacuated 106,000 people in Santiago de Cuba Province, 81,300 in Holguín Province, and 12,000 in Guantánamo Province. Power was preemptively cut across Guantánamo Province as a precautionary measure. On August 24, a further 45,000 people in Villa Clara Province, 16,466 people in Matanzas Province, and 300 in Ciego de Ávila Province were evacuated. The ongoing COVID-19 pandemic complicated evacuation efforts, resulting in typical evacuation shelters such as schools not being opened. Those suspected of being infected were relocated to quarantine centers. Residents nationwide were alerted to the potential of widespread flooding as many reservoirs were at or near capacity.

=== United States ===
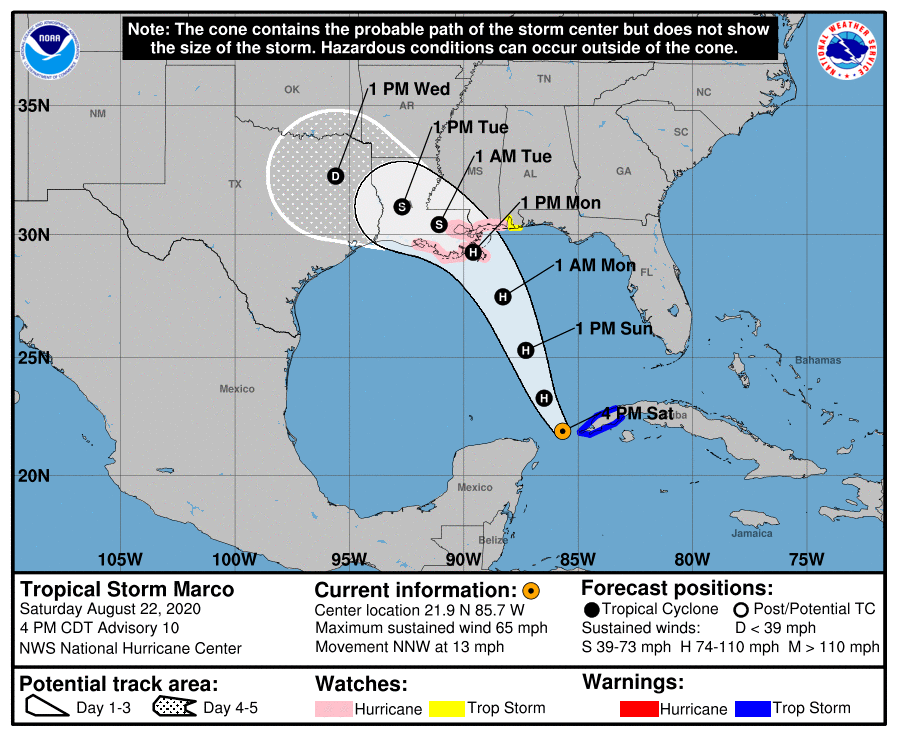
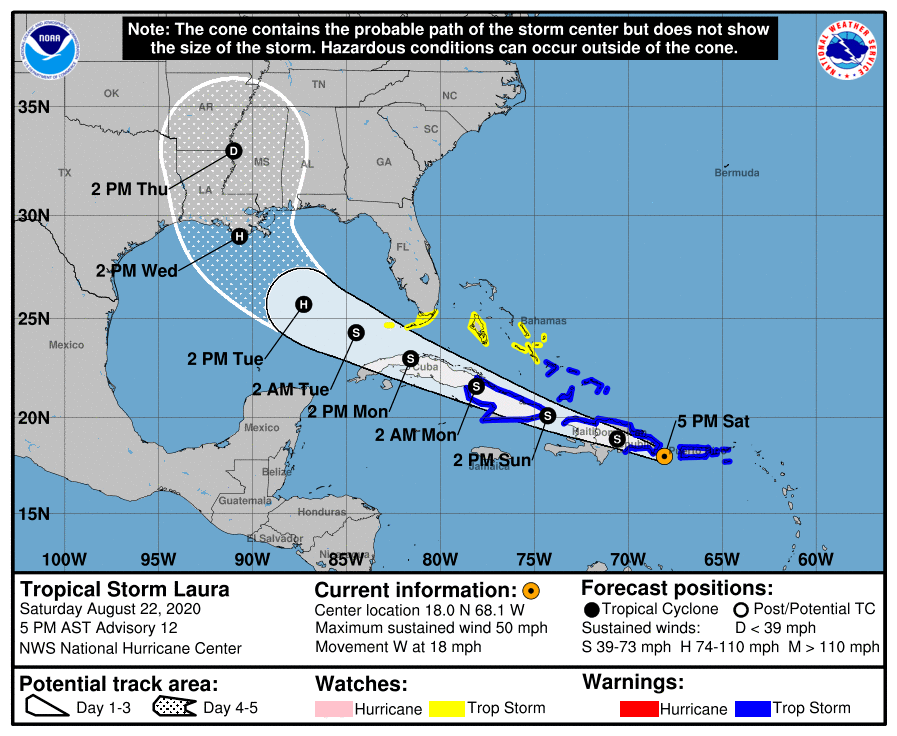
Forecast tracks and accompanying hurricane and tropical storm watches and warnings 21:00 UTC on August 22 for Marco (left) and Laura (right). At the time, both cyclones were forecast to make landfall in Louisiana as hurricanes. However, Marco dissipated along the coast of Southern Louisiana, on August 26. And Laura made landfall, on August 27, as a major hurricane.

Hurricanes Marco and Laura threatened a large swath of oil rigs positioned across the Gulf of Mexico. By August 23, approximately 58 percent of oil production and 45 percent of natural gas production was shut down; this included the evacuation of 114 platforms. By August 25, 299 of 643 platforms and 27 of 28 mobile rigs were evacuated. Seven tornado watches were issued for this storm. They included the Coastal Waters as well as Texas, Louisiana, Mississippi, Arkansas, Tennessee, Alabama, and Kentucky. The staff at the NWS Lake Charles office also evacuated; warnings for their area being issued by NWS Brownsville. Three rare Extreme Wind Warnings were issued for Louisiana and Texas as Laura approached landfall.

==== Puerto Rico ====
Puerto Rico Governor Wanda Vázquez declared a state of emergency, and FEMA teams were ready to help with recovery efforts in Puerto Rico.

==== Florida ====
On August 21, Florida Governor Ron DeSantis declared a state of emergency for southern counties in the state. A mobile hospital unit was pre-staged in Marion County and personal protection equipment kits were readied for distribution to shelters. A tropical storm watch was issued for the Florida Keys as the storm approached, although the north side of the area was dropped when Laura went farther south than expected. The rest were eventually upgraded to warnings. The mayor of Monroe County, Heather Carruthers declared a local state of emergency, and mandatory evacuations for mobile homes and boats, although visitors were allowed to stay.

==== Texas ====
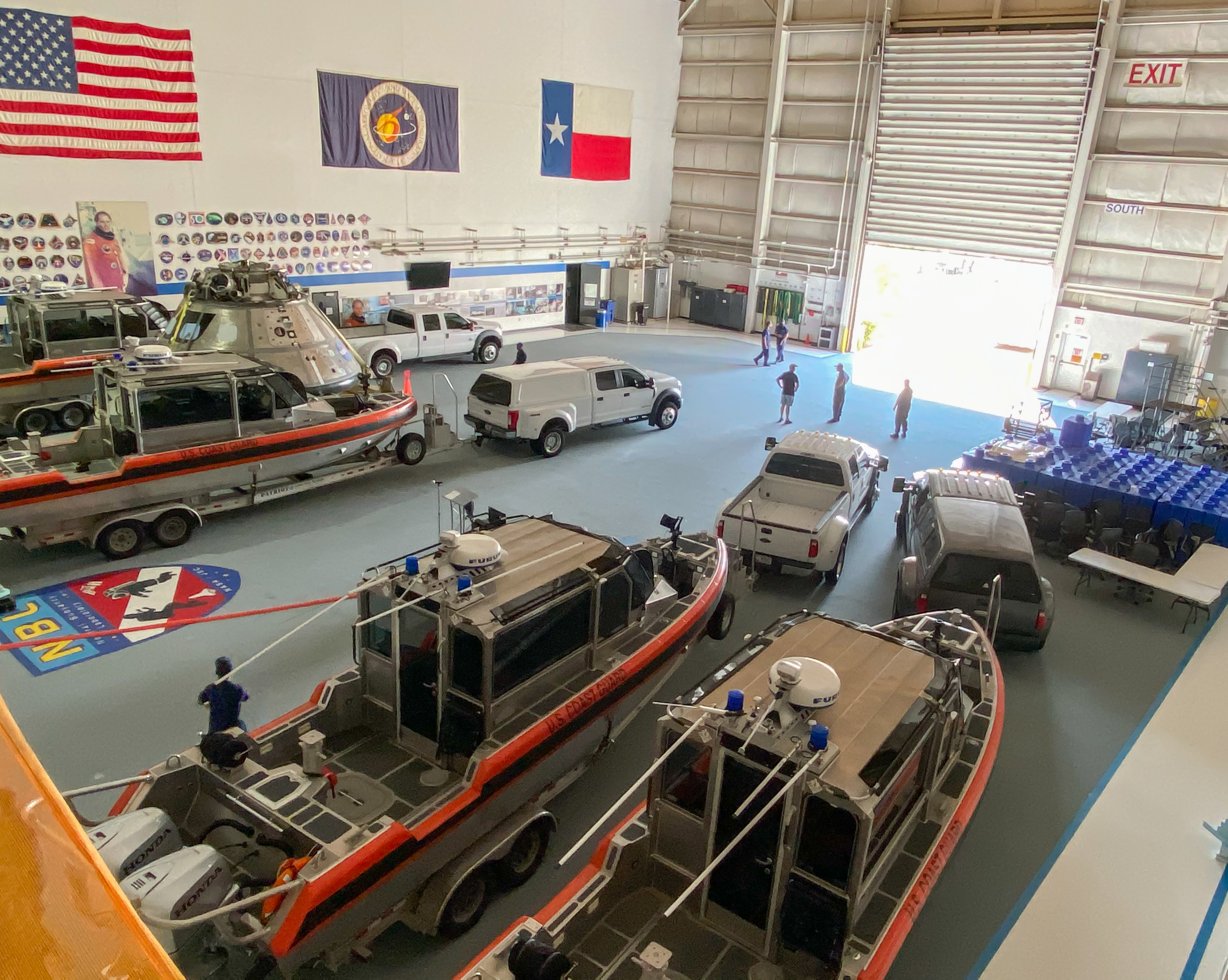
United States Coast Guard boats pre-staging at a NASA facility in Houston

Hurricane, tropical storm, and storm surge watches were issued for areas mainly near and east of Galveston on August 24. Most were upgraded to warnings the next day and a flash flood watch was also issued for the eastern portion of the state.

On August 23, Texas Governor Greg Abbott declared a state of emergency for 23 counties in eastern Texas. On August 25, mandatory evacuation orders were issued for low-lying areas of Chambers, Galveston and Jefferson counties, and for the entirety of Orange County. This included the entirety of the Bolivar Peninsula and cities of Galveston and Port Arthur. Galveston city officials advised residents that all city services would cease at noon on August 25 and upon the arrival of tropical storm-force winds, emergency services would be suspended. A total of 50 busses were used to assist in evacuations. A voluntary evacuation order was issued for coastal areas of Brazoria and Harris counties. An estimated 385,000 people were under evacuation orders in the state, including the entire city of Beaumont. On August 25, the next day's Houston Astros game against the Los Angeles Angels was rescheduled for September 5 in Anaheim.

==== Louisiana ====
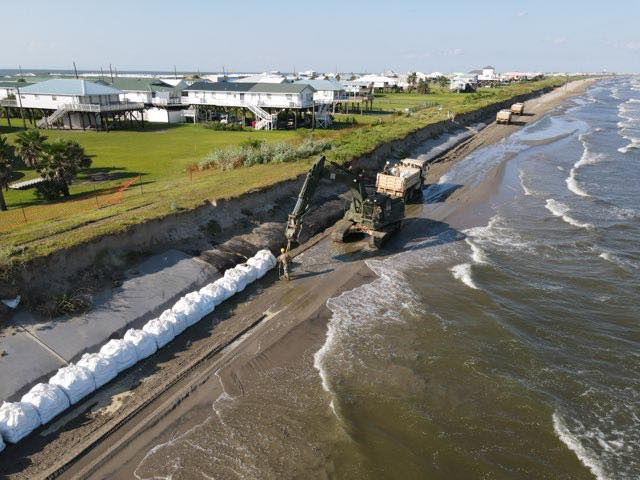
Soldiers and vehicles from the Louisiana Army National Guard reinforce a levee ahead of Hurricane Laura

Hurricane, tropical storm, and storm surge watches were issued for almost the entire coastline on August 24. This came just hours after the southeastern portion of the state had their tropical storm and storm surge warnings for Marco cancelled. Most of the watches were upgraded to warnings the next day and a flash flood watch was also issued for the western half of the state as over 10 inches (250 mm) of rain was expected. As the threat of surge increased for the coastline, the NHC stated that there would be "unsurvivable storm surge with large and destructive waves."

Due to the continued threat of Marco and Laura making landfall in Louisiana, on August 21, Louisiana Governor John Bel Edwards declared a state of emergency for 36 parishes. Evacuations related to Marco were in place for Plaquemines Parish, Jefferson Parish, Grand Isle, and Port Fourchon. A mandatory evacuation for the entirety of Calcasieu Parish, approximately 200,000 people, was ordered on August 25. State-run shelters were opened with cots spread farther apart due to the COVID-19 pandemic. Just hours before Laura made landfall on August 26, I-10 was shut down in both directions between the Louisiana/Texas border eastward to the Atchafalaya Basin.

==== Mississippi ====
Despite being well away from the center of the storm, the coastline of Mississippi was placed under a storm surge watch from Ocean Springs westward on August 24 due to the massive size of Laura. However, these were dropped before the storm made landfall. Mississippi Governor Tate Reeves declared a state of emergency on August 22 due to both Hurricanes Laura and Marco threatening the state, which the federal government granted on August 24.

==== Arkansas ====
Search and rescue teams were put on standby as Governor Asa Hutchinson declared an emergency ahead of Hurricane Laura and set aside $250,000 to prepare for the storm's impacts. One day later President Donald Trump declared a state of emergency for the state of Arkansas. For the first time in the state's history the National Weather Service issued tropical storm watches and warnings for several southern counties of Arkansas with local forecasters predicting that areas southeast of Little Rock face the greatest risk of damage.

== Impact ==
Deaths and damage by territory
| Country/Territory | | Fatalities | Damage (2020 USD) | Ref |
|---|---|---|---|---|
| Lesser Antilles | | 0 | ≥$100 million | |
| Dominican Republic | | 9 | ≥$100 million | |
| Haiti | | 31 | ≥$100 million | |
| Cuba | | 0 | ≥$100 million | |
| Jamaica | | 0 | ≥$100 million | |
| Cayman Islands | | 0 | ≥$100 million | |
| United States | Puerto Rico | 0 | ≥$100 million | |
| United States | Florida | 1 | $23.2 billion | |
| United States | Louisiana | 30 | $23.2 billion | |
| United States | Mississippi | 0 | $23.2 billion | |
| United States | Texas | 10 | $23.2 billion | |
| United States | Arkansas | 0 | $23.2 billion | |
| Totals: | | 81 | ≥$23.3 billion | |

Laura caused widespread devastation throughout most of its path with tropical-storm force winds going over almost all of the Antillean Islands, hurricane and tropical-storm force winds impacting parts of Florida, Louisiana, Texas, Mississippi, and Arkansas, and flooding rain and storm surge affecting a large portion of the storm's path. Losses are estimated at over $19.1 billion, and at least 81 people were killed, with 63 of them coming from Haiti and Louisiana alone, making Laura the 16th-costliest hurricane on record. With agricultural losses estimated at $1.6 billion, Laura did more agriculture damages in Louisiana than Hurricanes Katrina and Rita combined.

=== Lesser Antilles ===
As Laura passed through the Leeward Islands, the storm brought heavy rainfall to the islands of Guadeloupe and Dominica, which was captured on radar imagery from Guadeloupe. In the Netherlands Antilles, Saba, Sint Eustatius, and Sint-Maarten saw minor flooding. Scattered power outages affected 4,000 people in Saint Kitts and Nevis. In the Virgin Islands, a peak wind gust of 41 miles per hour (66 km/h) was reported in Sandy Point, Saint Croix. It caused some power outages and flash flooding across the Virgin Islands.

=== Hispaniola ===
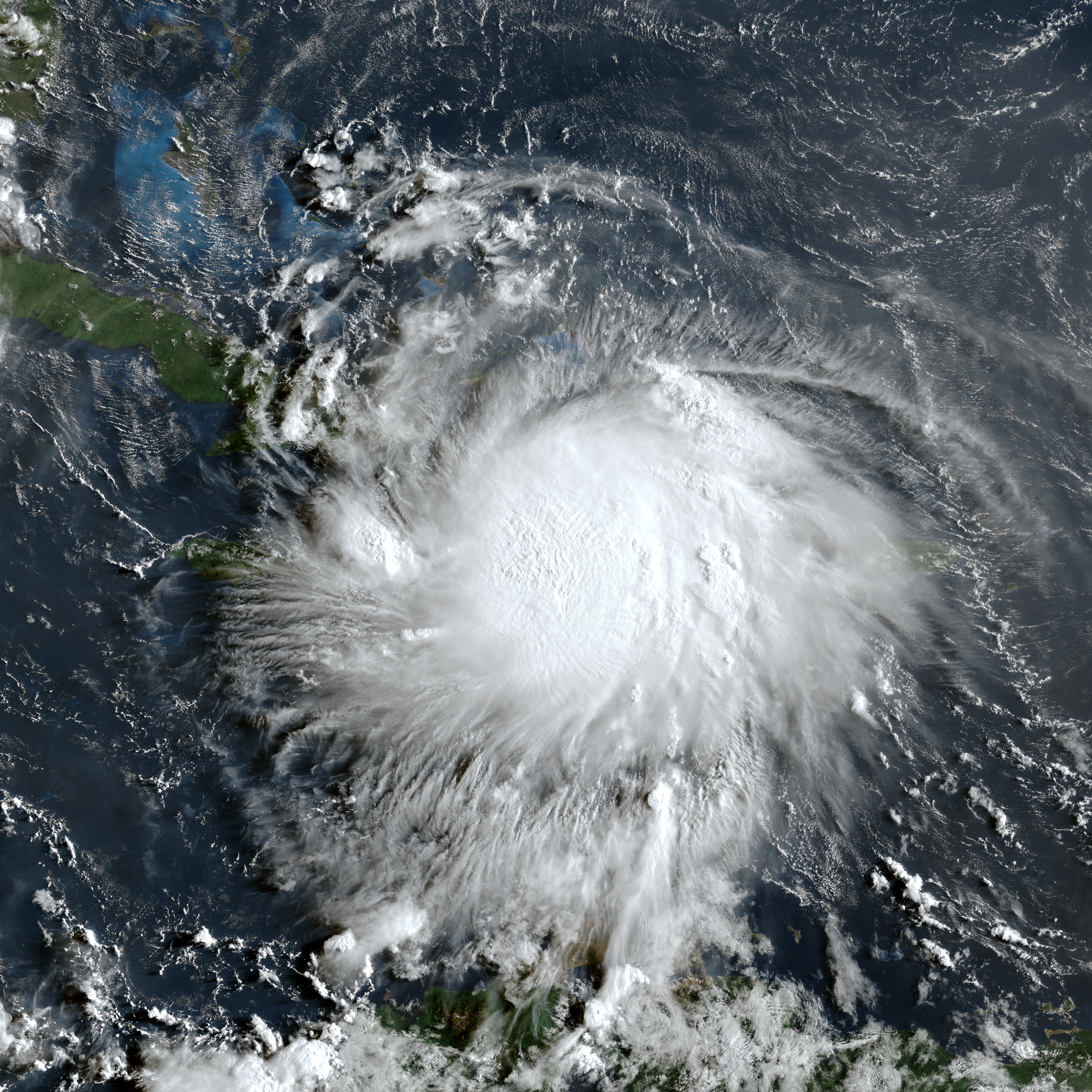
Tropical Storm Laura over Hispaniola on August 23

Tropical Storm Laura brought damaging winds and flooding rains to much of the Dominican Republic. Precipitation was heaviest along the southern coast, with a peak 24-hour accumulation of 11.7 in (300 mm) in Barahona. Approximately 1.1 million people lost power while 1.56 million people experienced disruption to water services. Early assessments as of August 24 indicated significant damage to 1,791 homes, prompting the evacuation of 8,995 people. In Santo Domingo, a woman and her son died after their house collapsed, due to the rain brought by Laura, and in Pedro Brand, a man died when a tree fell on his house. Severe flooding was reported across Santo Domingo. A police officer died after falling on a downed electric cable in the Elías Piña Province.

Similar to the Dominican Republic, heavy precipitation affected much of Haiti; a personal weather station in Port-au-Prince measured 6.61 in (168 mm) of rain. Extensive flooding affected the nation, forcing many families to evacuate their homes. As of August 28, at least 31 people were confirmed dead with another 8 missing. The Péligre Dam overflowed, sending floodwaters down the Artibonite valley. Public Works Minister Nader Joaseus alerted residents that the dam could collapse. Agriculture suffered significant damage as the nation struggled with COVID-19 related food shortages. Flooding damaged 447 homes and destroyed 15 others across the Artibonite department.

=== Cuba ===
After clearing Hispaniola, Tropical Storm Laura brought damaging winds and flooding rains to Southeastern Cuba on August 23–24. Wind gusts reached 91 mph (146 km/h) in Maisí, tearing roofs off homes and downing trees. Rainfall reached 9.51 in (241.5 mm) in Complejo Palma, Santiago de Cuba, and 7.50 in (190.6 mm) in San Antonio del Sur, Guantánamo. Damage across Holguín Province was relatively limited; some structures and crops were damaged and scattered power outages occurred. A bridge in Buey Arriba, Granma Province, collapsed due to flooding, which isolated 30 communities. A station in Cabo Cruz recorded sustained winds of 50 mph (80 km/h) and a gust of 65 mph (104 km/h). Minor flooding and power outages occurred in Las Tunas Province.

=== Jamaica and Cayman Islands ===
Flash flooding across Jamaica caused significant disruptions to road infrastructure. A weather station in Negril, Jamaica observed 4.97 in (126 mm) of rain. A landslide blocked the main road to Gordon Town; unstable terrain hampered efforts to clear debris. A bridge in Saint Thomas Parish was washed away, isolating residents of Trinityville, Georgia, and Cedar Valley. Additionally, the main road connecting Papine to Dallas Castle in Bull Bay collapsed. Wind gusts reached 35 to 40 mph (56 to 64 km/h) along southern coastlines near Kingston, and in Montego Bay on the country's north coast. Initial damage estimates totaled to around J$54 million (US$360,000) according to Jamaica's National Works Agency (NWA).

Rounds of gusty winds and heavy rainfall affected the Cayman Islands as Laura passed just to the north.

=== United States ===
Strongest landfalling Atlantic U.S. hurricanes^{†}
| Rank | Name^{‡} | Season | Wind speed | |
| Rank | Name^{‡} | Season | mph | km/h |
|---|---|---|---|---|
| 1 | "Labor Day" | 1935 | 185 | 295 |
| 2 | Camille | 1969 | 175 | 280 |
| 3 | Andrew | 1992 | 165 | 270 |
| 4 | "San Felipe II"* | 1928 | 160 | 260 |
| 4 | Michael | 2018 | 160 | 260 |
| 6 | Maria | 2017 | 155 | 250 |
| 7 | "Last Island" | 1856 | 150 | 240 |
| 7 | "Indianola" | 1886 | 150 | 240 |
| 7 | "Florida Keys" | 1919 | 150 | 240 |
| 7 | "Freeport" | 1932 | 150 | 240 |
| 7 | Charley | 2004 | 150 | 240 |
| 7 | Laura | 2020 | 150 | 240 |
| 7 | Ida | 2021 | 150 | 240 |
| 7 | Ian | 2022 | 150 | 240 |
Source: NHC, AOML/HRD
^{†}Strength refers to maximum sustained wind speed upon striking land.
^{‡}Systems prior to 1950 were not officially named.
*Name given to the storm at its peak landfall.

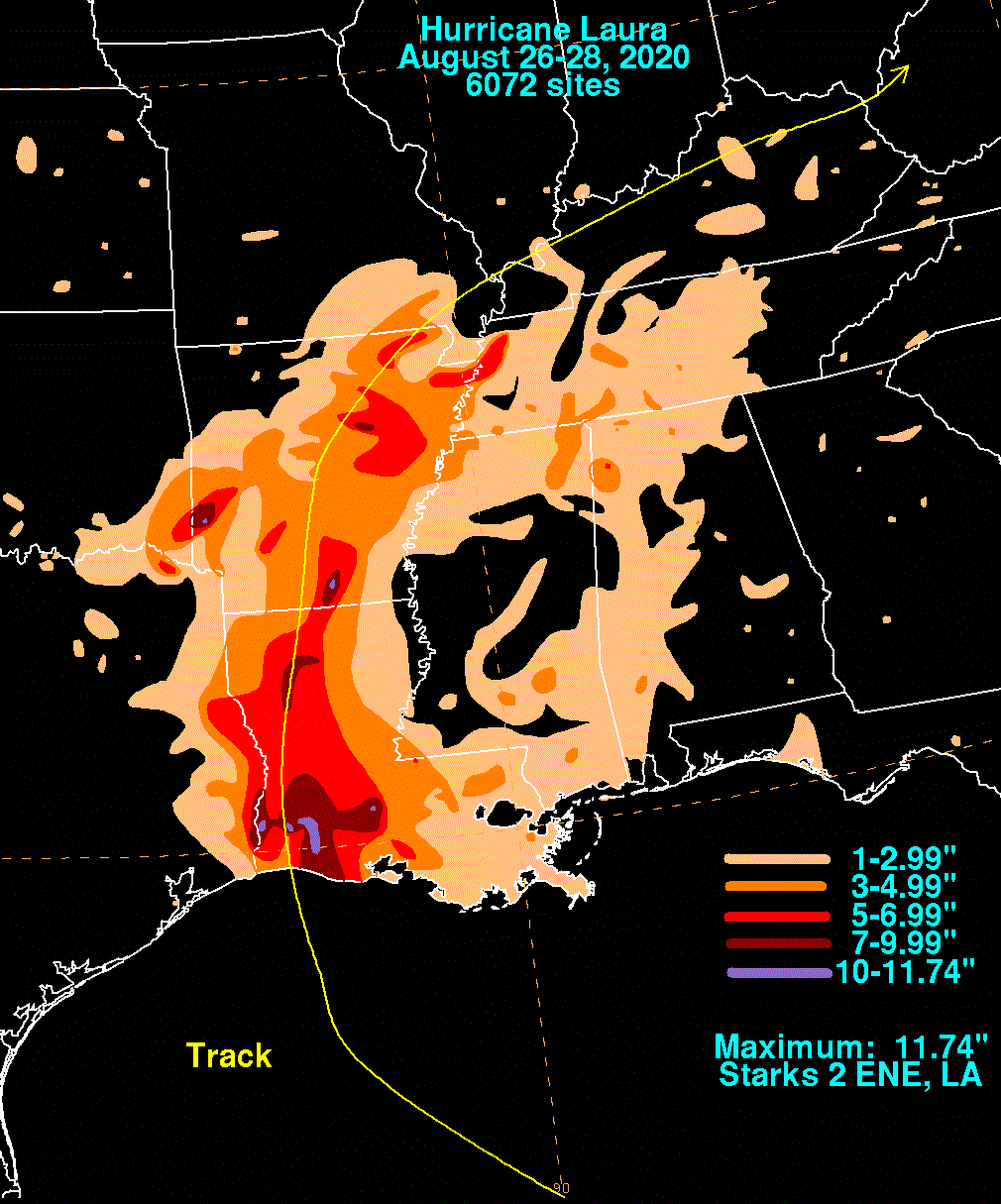
Rainfall from Hurricane Laura.

Hurricane Laura produced at least 16 tornadoes in Louisiana, Arkansas, Mississippi, Tennessee, and Alabama. The preliminary insured damages from Hurricane Laura in Texas and Louisiana were estimated at $19 billion. Laura became the first major hurricane to strike the mainland United States since Michael in October 2018.

==== Puerto Rico ====
In Puerto Rico, Laura downed trees and caused flooding in Salinas. Part of the Salinas city sign was also blown over during the storm. A peak of 4.09 in (104 mm) of precipitation was reported in Villalba, with a peak wind gust of 75 miles per hour (120 km/h) being reported in Salinas. Roughly 200,000 customers lost power in Puerto Rico, with nearly 14,000 losing access to running water.

==== Florida ====
Tropical storm-force wind gusts affected several counties across southern Florida, particularly Collier, Miami-Dade, and Monroe counties. A gust of 65 mph (105 km/h) was observed at the Turkey Point Nuclear Generating Station. Farther south, a strong squall line moved through Key West, damaging streetlights, downing a tree, and generating a 69 mph (111 km/h) wind gust at the National Weather Service's Key West office. On August 25, a St. George Island first responder drowned while trying to rescue a swimmer caught in rough surf.

==== Louisiana ====
The first report of sustained tropical-storm force winds on land was at Cypremort Point, on Vermilion Bay, where 45 miles per hour (70 km/h) winds were recorded. Numerous tornado warnings began to be issued throughout Louisiana as Laura approached the coast on August 26. An EF0 tornado touched down briefly near Paincourtville, although no damage occurred. Another tornado was reportedly spotted by a trained spotter in Bell City, but was never confirmed. Coastal water rises began at around 19:00 UTC on August 26.

Cameron saw at least 9.19 feet (2.80 m) of storm surge. Holly Beach was extensively damaged as an RV was destroyed and several homes suffered roof damage. Storm surge flooding also covered SH 82. The town of Hackberry was severely damaged by storm surge flooding and two trains were derailed in Grand Lake, where the Grand Lake High School suffered damage.

Severe damage occurred throughout Lake Charles with widespread catastrophic-level damage to residential and commercial building roofs and structure, as well as half of all matured trees either blown down, badly stripped of branches, or 'broken over'. Double- and Triple-KVA (kilovolt-amp) power transmission towers and lines feeding power throughout the area were heavily damaged and/or destroyed. An RV was blown over and many mobile homes in parks were knocked off their mounts, some rolled over, older ones stripped of their siding and gutted. The Lake Charles Regional Airport saw a wind gust of 128 miles per hour (206 km/h) as well as multiple hangars destroyed. Another wind gust in the city reached 137 miles per hour (220 km/h). Many windows were blown out of Capital One Tower in Downtown Lake Charles.

Intracoastal City saw a storm surge of 6 feet (1.8 m). Storm surge also flooded over SH 317 at Burns Point in St. Mary Parish. In Sulphur, a hotel was damaged. Extensive structural damage also occurred in Vinton. Softwood trees were blown down on Fort Polk. The NWS radar at Fort Polk also suffered a communication outage, causing it to go down. A home in Carlyss had its roof and entire back room ripped off, while another home was damaged in New Llano after a carport was blown into it. There was extensive damage to trees, power lines and poles, and structures in De Quincy and much of the town of Delcambre was left underwater due to flooding. A tree was blown down onto a fraternity house in Lafayette.

Hurricane Laura caused the largest power outage in Baton Rouge since Isaac in 2012. In Shreveport a tree fell on a house, injuring a person inside, while another tree fell on a vehicle. In Monroe, metal roofing was blown off multiple buildings. Widespread flooding was reported in Natchitoches Parish, where I-49 had to be closed past SH 174 west of Powhatan due to a downed tree. The police station in Robeline had its roof ripped off to go with the numerous downing of large trees throughout the town. Near Bossier City, a large tree was blown down on the Centenary College of Louisiana campus while several homes were damaged by falling trees south-southwest of the city. In Greenwood, flash flooding led to high water over the shoulder roads of I-20 at exit 5 with drivers being advised to use US 80 as an alternative.

A total of 30 fatalities occurred throughout the state, four of them arising from falling trees. They included a 14-year-old girl in Vernon Parish, a 68-year-old man in Acadia Parish, a 51-year-old man in Jackson Parish, and a 64-year-old man in Allen Parish. Carbon monoxide poisoning from generators being inside homes, which is strongly discouraged, led to the deaths of twelve people in Calcasieu Parish and two people in Allen Parish. Another man died of drowning while aboard a sinking boat during the storm. Finally, one person died in Calcasieu Parish in a house fire, four people died in Calcasieu Parish, Natchitoches Parish, and Rapides Parish during the cleanup process, and eight others died in Beauregard Parish, Grant Parish, Rapides Parish, and Vernon Parish due to heat-related illnesses following the loss of electricity.

==== Texas ====
Before the hurricane made landfall, one person was killed and another injured after rough surf from Laura slammed them against jetties in Corpus Christi on August 26. Another man died after he was electrocuted while preparing for the storm. Eastern Texas saw a few tornado warnings as Laura neared landfall on August 26 as well, but no tornadoes were confirmed. Coastal water rises in the southeast part of the state began at around 20:00 UTC that same day. Wind gusts in both Houston and Galveston peaked at 38 miles per hour (61 km/h). A wind gust of 79 miles per hour (127 km/h) was recorded at Kirbyville Raws site near Call and trees were downed in Groves. In Port Arthur, trees were downed, including one that fell on a house, and a parking lot lamp snapped at its base. A large tree also fell on and damaged a house in Beaumont. Structural damage occurred in near Pinehurst just west of Orange, where multiple trees and power lines where downed and several structures, including a church, were damaged. Structural damage also occurred in Bridge City. More trees and power lines were blown down across both Angelina and Sabine Counties, some of which blocked roads. In Hemphill, a roof collapsed at an Ashley HomeStore and multiple roads were blocked by falling trees. A man was killed northeast of the town when a tree fell on him while he was sitting on a recliner in his home. Southeast of the city, trees fell on homes and blocked all exits in the McGee's Landing Area. East of Center, a tree and power lines fell on FM 417 and FM 2694. Following the storm, five people died in Southeast Texas in four separate incidents of carbon monoxide poisoning as a result of improperly-placed generators. One person in Newton County was also killed in the cleanup process.

==== Mississippi ====
Despite the reduced surge threat on the coast, Mississippi still faced the threat of tornadoes from the storm, especially on the western side of the state. A number of tornado warnings were issued for parts of the state starting on August 26 with an EF0 tornado confirmed in Oxford on August 27. Widespread flash flooding occurred across Jefferson Davis County. In Natchez, trees were blown down and a sign at an AutoZone damaged six vehicles when it was blown down. A tree was also blown down on a house in Warrenton.

==== Arkansas ====
Laura entered Arkansas while still at tropical storm strength. Numerous tornado warnings were issued in Arkansas with eight tornadoes confirmed in the state, the largest tornado outbreak ever recorded in the state during the month of August. A high-end EF1 tornado caused significant damage to a church in Lake City, though no one injured. This same storm dropped another high-end EF1 tornado north of Brookland. A rare PDS tornado warning was also issued for this tornado. The storm then dropped its strongest tornado, which was rated low-end EF2, which damaged structures and homes southwest of Maynard. Widespread flash flood warnings were issued throughout the state. A 57 miles per hour (92 km/h) wind gust was recorded just south of El Dorado, causing several trees and power lines to fall, two of which landed on houses. This caused many power outages in Union County. Numerous trees were downed in the Doddridge area, including one on US 71, causing numerous power outages. South of Bradley near the Louisiana/Arkansas state line, a tree fell on AR 29, blocking the road. AR 343 was shut down between Lewisville and AR 53 due to falling trees. Uprooted trees fell on power lines in Dermott and a barn also had its roof removed in Wilmot.

Trees were uprooted and power lines were downed across a widespread area in several counties. In the town of Camden, numerous trees were blown down, including one that fell on a house, and a metal roof was blown off a shop building. Downed trees were also reported in Sheridan and power poles were snapped along US 67 northeast of Caddo Valley. Eastbound I-30 was shut down west of Hope at mile marker 26 due to a downed tree blocking both lanes of the freeway. In Kingsland, several large trees were blown down, including one that significantly damaged a house. In Goodrich, a house carport was destroyed with a hole through its wall. Several roads east of Mena were closed due to flooding. A portion of County Road 106 southwest of Ravenden was washed out due to flooding, and flash flooding in Sherwood left an intersection impassable.

==== Elsewhere ====
Moderate to heavy rainfall impacted the eastern half of Oklahoma, prompting a flash flood warning in Le Flore County. Outflow from the storm also generated a band of southwest-moving thunderstorms that extended from Oklahoma City southward to the Texas border.

In Tennessee, a flash flood warning was issued in Memphis and tornado and severe thunderstorm warnings were issued in the western part of the state late on August 27. The next day, more warnings were issued, including one tornado warning for areas just north of Nashville, which had been hit by a high-end EF3 tornado just under six months earlier. Two EF0 tornadoes were confirmed in the state.

Multiple tornado warnings were also issued in Southern Missouri, Kentucky, Northern Alabama, and Eastern Maryland. Four tornadoes were confirmed in Alabama with three being rated EF1 while the other was rated EF0.

== Aftermath ==
=== Haiti ===
Following the passage of Laura, Haiti's Directorate General of Civil Protection (DGCP) began damage assessments. The agency quickly distributed food kits to affected residents in the Ouest, Nippes, Sud-Est, and Sud departments. Water treatment products were sent to Anse-à-Pitres and Belle-Anse by the National Directorate for Drinking Water and Sanitation. The World Health Organization (WHO) and Pan American Health Organization (PAHO) deployed medical teams across the country to assist the Haitian National Red Cross Society, though transport of victims was hampered by limited access to ambulances. Eleven schools were converted to shelters; however, many evacuees opted to stay with neighbors or relatives due to fears of COVID-19.

=== United States ===
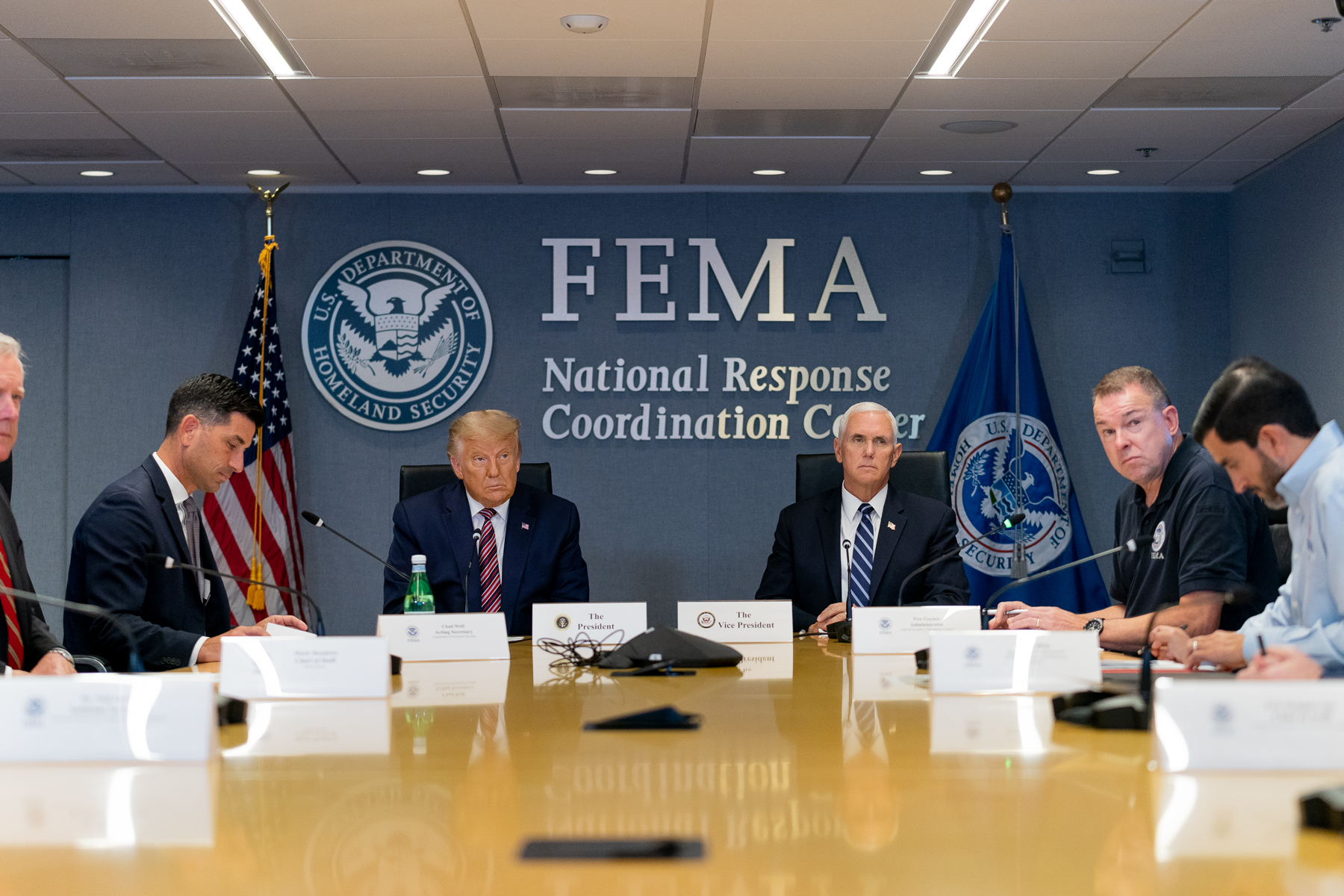
U.S. President Donald Trump at a FEMA meeting on August 27

The governors of both Texas and Louisiana surveyed storm damage in the hardest hit parts of their respective states after the storm had passed. Roads in both Calcasieu and Cameron Parishes in Louisiana were impassable, cutting off road access to both Cameron and Creole. About 200,000 people were left without drinking water after Laura made 80 water systems inoperable. Additionally, some areas saw complete destruction in their power grids, and over a million people lost power. Some areas were expected to be without power for weeks or even months. Multiple homes also were uninhabitable due to air conditioning units being destroyed. Recovery efforts were hampered by additional rainfall in the days after Laura had passed.

After the storm, President Donald Trump approved a post-storm major disaster declaration for 23 parishes in Louisiana on August 27. Two days later, he visited the areas most heavily affected by the storm, including Lake Charles in Calcasieu Parish, and Orange County. Trump visited the Cajun Navy, a rescue organization, and met with Governor John Bel Edwards.

Post-storm assessments indicated extensive damage and losses to Louisiana's timber industry with some small private forest landowners reporting complete loss of their timber acreage, an outcome which they had not experienced in the aftermath of Hurricane Rita, 15 years earlier. Extensive damage was also reported to Louisiana's industrial facilities with one-third showing some type of damage and nine out of the 138 facilities showing critical damage, causing environmental concerns. Some of the most critically damaged facilities were the BioLab facility in Lake Charles and the Equistar Chemical facility in Westlake, and the Chemical Waste Management facility and the Lotte Chemical plant in Lake Charles.

Many of the repairs in Louisiana were undone six weeks later by Hurricane Delta, which made landfall just 12 miles (19 km) east of where Hurricane Laura did, with many areas in and around hard-hit Lake Charles being damaged again.

On September 7, 2024, the Capital One Tower was imploded by a demolition crew after the property's owners, Hertz Investment Group, settled with the building's insurance provider, Zurich Insurance Group, for an undisclosed amount. The $7 million demolition was funded by private money secured by the Lake Charles city government. The future of the property remains uncertain.

=== Retirement ===
Due to the damage and loss of life in Louisiana and southeast Texas, the name Laura was retired from the Atlantic rotating naming lists by the World Meteorological Organization in March 2021, and will never be used again for an Atlantic tropical cyclone. It was replaced with Leah for the 2026 season.

== See also ==
- Tropical cyclones in 2020
- List of Category 4 Atlantic hurricanes
- List of costliest Atlantic hurricanes
- List of Louisiana hurricanes
