= Meteorological history of Hurricane Laura =

Hurricane Laura
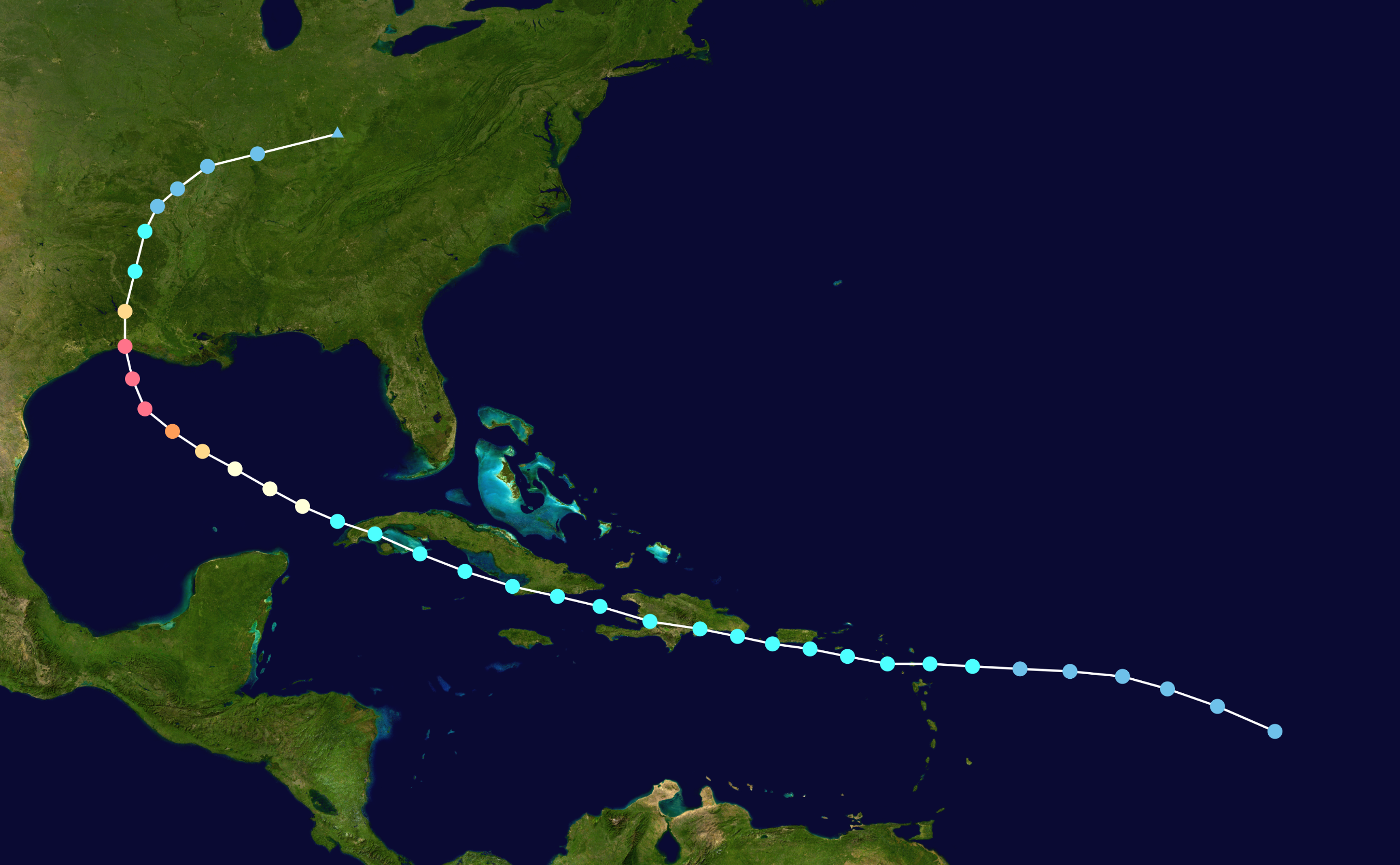
- Track of Laura, according to the Saffir–Simpson scale

Meteorological history
- Formed: August 20, 2020
- Dissipated: August 29, 2020

Category 4 major hurricane
- 1-minute sustained (SSHWS/NWS)
- Highest winds: 150 mph (240 km/h)
- Lowest pressure: 937 mbar (hPa); 27.67 inHg

Overall effects
- Areas affected: Lesser Antilles, Greater Antilles, The Bahamas, Gulf Coast of the United States, Midwestern United States, Eastern United States
- Part of the 2020 Atlantic hurricane season
- History: Meteorological history; Effects: Louisiana; Other wikis: Commons: Laura images

Hurricane Laura tied the record for the strongest hurricane to make landfall in Louisiana as measured by maximum sustained winds, along with the 1856 Last Island hurricane and Hurricane Ida, and was overall the tenth-strongest hurricane to make landfall in the United States. The thirteenth tropical cyclone, twelfth named storm, fourth hurricane, and first major hurricane of the 2020 Atlantic hurricane season, Laura originated from a large tropical wave that moved off the West African coast on August 16. The tropical wave gradually organized, becoming a tropical depression on August 20. Though in only a marginally conducive environment for intensification, the depression nevertheless intensified into a tropical storm a day later, becoming the earliest twelfth named storm on record in the North Atlantic basin, forming eight days earlier than 1995's Hurricane Luis. The depression received the name Laura and tracked west-northwest towards the Lesser Antilles.

Laura first hit the Lesser Antilles and brushed Puerto Rico as a tropical storm, before it moved across the island of Hispaniola. The storm killed 21 people in Haiti and four in the Dominican Republic. The storm later moved across the length of Cuba, while maintaining its intensity as convection was mainly to the south of the island, although its outer rainbands extended into the Florida Keys and South Florida. Laura moved across the Gulf of Mexico, strengthening slowly at first, before a period of rapid intensification began on August 26. That day, Laura became a major hurricane, and later attained peak winds of 150 mph (240 km/h), making it a strong Category 4 hurricane, with its pressure bottoming out at 937 mbar (27.7 inHg). Early on August 27, Laura made landfall near peak intensity on Cameron, Louisiana with 150 miles per hour (240 km/h) winds, with a minimum central pressure of 939 mbar (27.7 inHg). It quickly weakened over land, degrading to a tropical storm over Northwestern Louisiana before dropping to tropical depression status near Pine Bluff, Arkansas on August 28. It turned eastward and became a remnant low over Kentucky on August 29 before being absorbed by an extratropical low over Maryland several hours later.

== Origins, early development, and Lesser Antilles landfalls ==
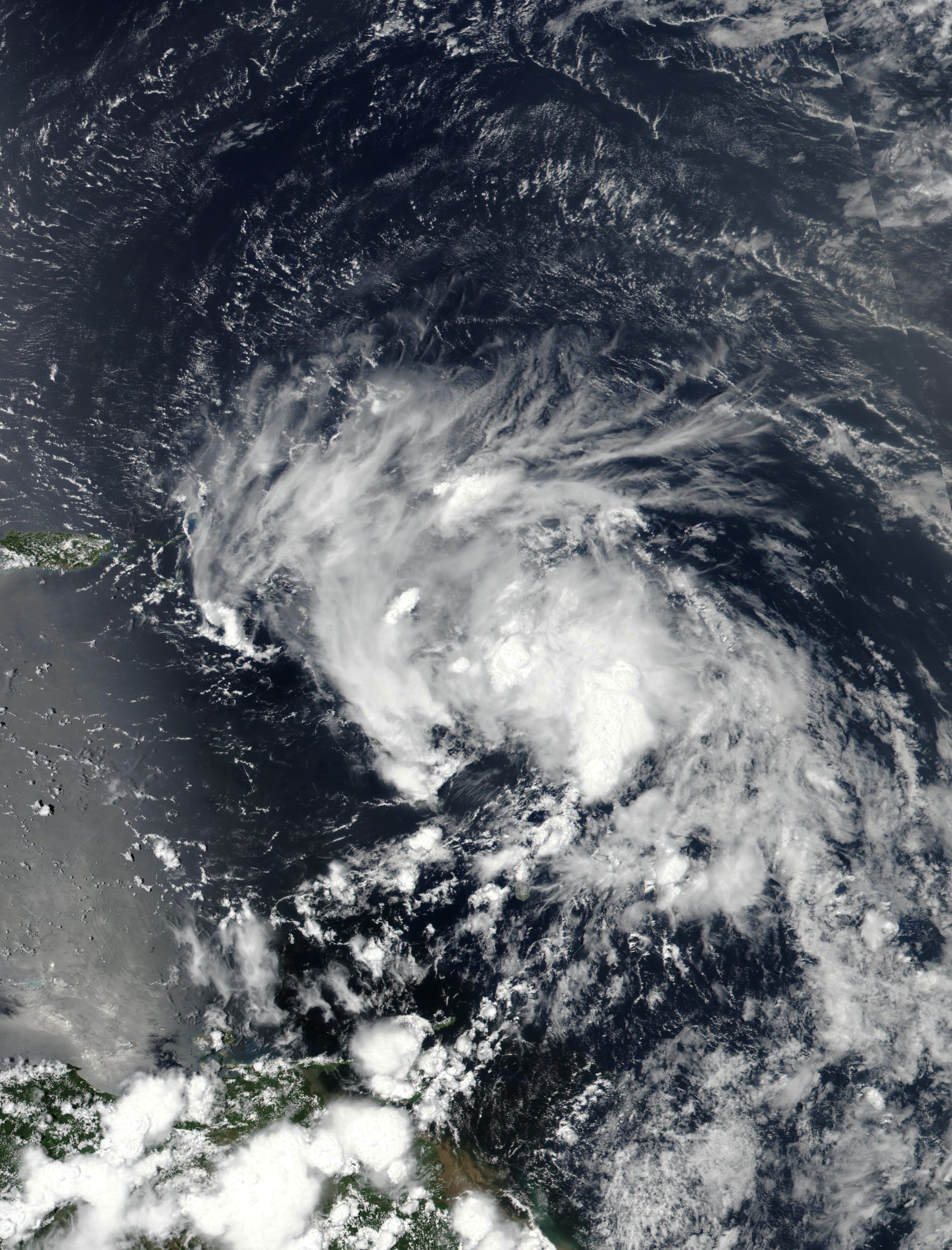
Laura shortly after being named on August 21.

On August 16, a large tropical wave moved off the coast of Africa. The same day, the National Hurricane Center noted the possibility of tropical development as the wave neared more favorable conditions, with the 5-day development chance being estimated at 20%. The next day, the wave entered more favorable developmental conditions and the NHC raised the 5-day development chance to 50%. It then merged with another disturbance to its west and a low-pressure area formed, prompting the NHC to raise the 5-day development potential to 90%. The low continued to slowly organize with rainbands apparent and a well-defined low-level center forming. By 00:00 UTC on August 20, the low had organized enough to be designated as Tropical Depression Thirteen and advisories were initiated on the storm three hours later. At the time, it was located around 850 miles (1,370 km) east-southeast of Antigua. The Bermuda High over the Central Atlantic built westward, which in turned steered the system west-northwestward. The system would be steered around this ridge for its entire existence. Environmental conditions featured mixed signals for intensification, including low wind shear and dry air from the Saharan Air Layer. Accordingly, forecast models displayed solutions ranging from the system degrading back into a tropical wave all the way to becoming a major hurricane within the next five days.

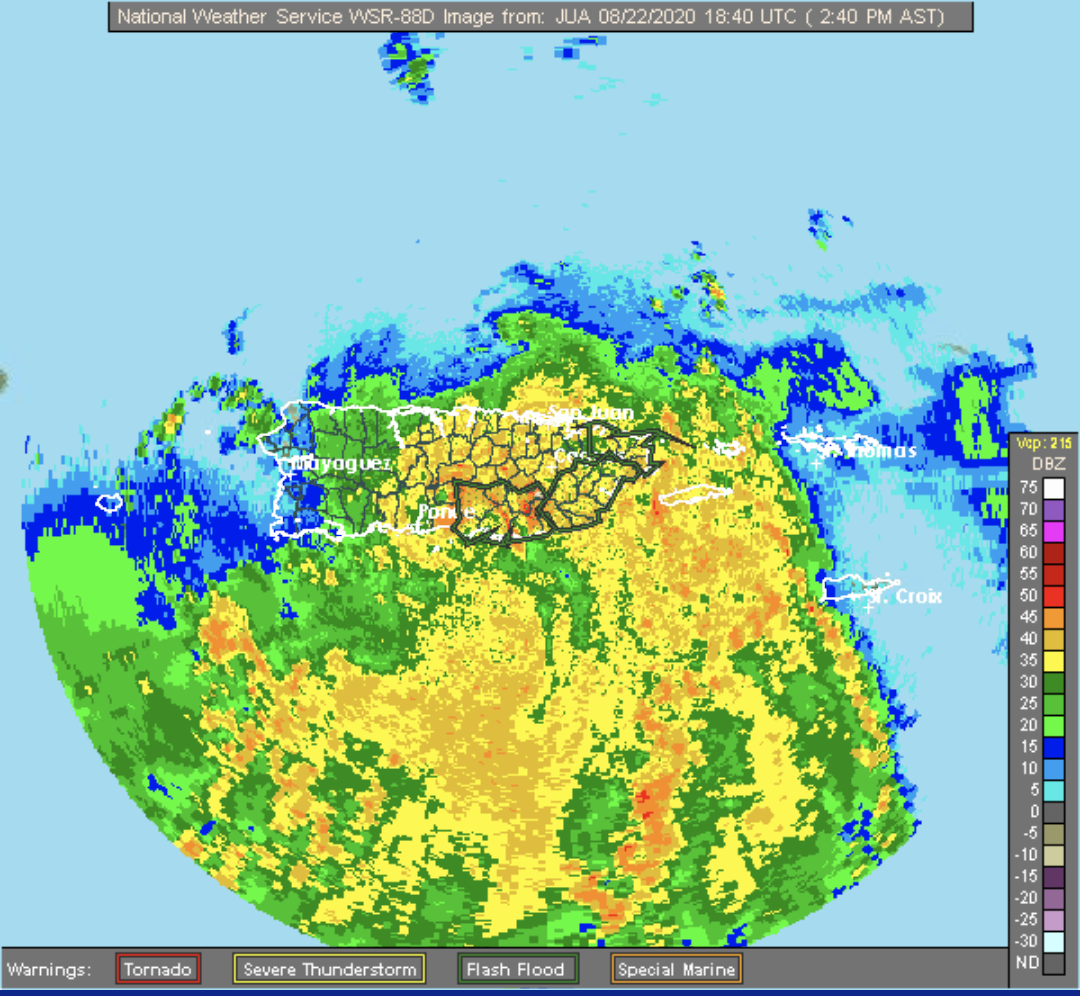
Radar image showing Tropical Storm Laura passing south of Puerto Rico on August 22.

Initial aircraft reconnaissance into the system late on August 20 into August 21 revealed a poorly organized system with an ill-defined, elongated surface low. Furthermore, the system's mid-level circulation was displaced several hundred miles southeast of the assumed surface circulation. During the early part of August 21, the depression may have degenerated into a tropical wave, although the NHC continued to issue advisories on the system. The depression continued to struggle because of significant mid-level wind shear, dry air, and its fast forward motion of over 20 mph (32 km/h). However, a Hurricane Hunters flight on August 21 observed gale-force winds and a center farther south then previously estimated. Consequently, the National Hurricane Center upgraded the depression to a tropical storm and named it Laura at 13:05 UTC; post-storm analysis determined that the system had become a tropical storm around 12:00 UTC. This made Laura the earliest twelfth named Atlantic storm ever recorded, beating the record of Hurricane Luis of 1995 by eight days. At the time, Laura was located around 230 miles (370 km) east-southeast of the northern Leeward Islands and had maximum sustained winds of 45 mph (72 km/h) and a minimum central pressure of 1,007 mbar (29.7 inHg). Despite being stronger, Laura remained poorly organized due to moderate wind shear as it moved over the Leeward Islands, with most of its convection and strongest winds located north and east of the center of circulation. Continuing west-northwestward with no change in strength, Laura made its first landfall in Antigua around 20:30 UTC before making landfall in Nevis around 23:30 UTC. Eventually, Laura became slightly better organized and it strengthened a little as it passed south of Puerto Rico, although its center remained elongated. During the afternoon of August 22, a strong mesocyclone within the storm's broader circulation impacted Puerto Rico; sustained winds associated with this feature reached 60 mph (97 km/h) in Las Marías, although this was not representative of the storm's actual intensity. Laura then made landfall near San Pedro de Macorís, Dominican Republic at around 04:30 UTC on August 23 with 1-minute sustained winds of 50 mph (80 km/h) and a pressure of 1004 mbars (29.64 inHg).

== Trek through the Greater Antilles ==
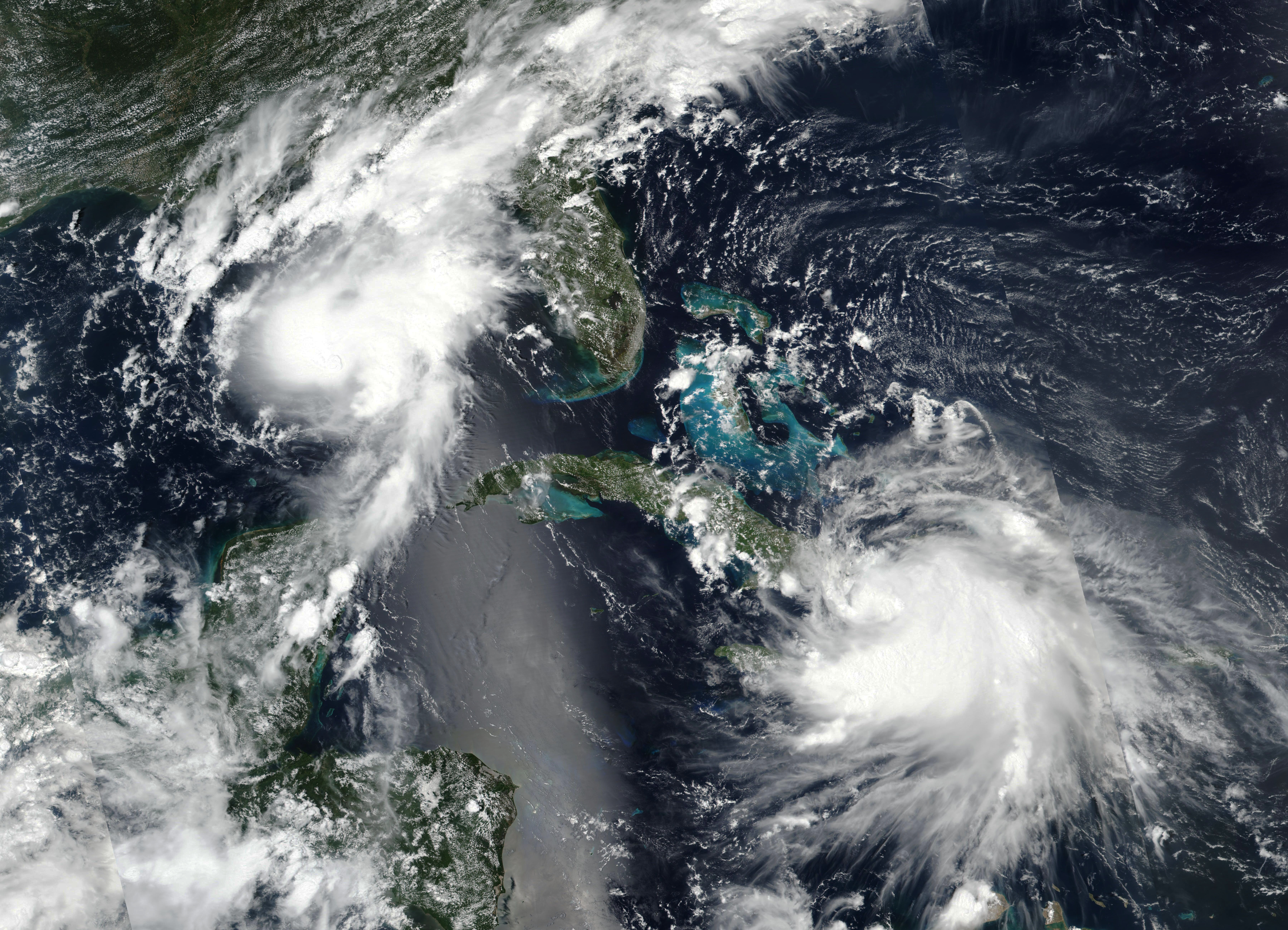
Tropical Storm Laura (right) and Hurricane Marco (left) on August 23.

Despite moving over rugged, mountainous terrain, normally an impediment to tropical cyclone organization, the large size of Laura as well as its lack of inner core allowed it to maintain most of its intensity as it moved over Hispaniola and the overall structure of the storm actually improved with expanding upper-level outflow and intense convection over the Barahona Peninsula. Continuing to move west-northwestward around the southern side of the Bermuda High building westward over the Southeastern U.S., Laura moved back over water in the Windward Passage and strengthened some before making landfall in Eastern Cuba with 65 mph (105 km/h) winds and a 1000 mbar (29.53 inHg) pressure at 02:00 UTC on August 24. However, most of its convection was located south of the center due to wind shear. Continuing to trek west-northwestward, Laura moved back over the Caribbean Sea just south of the coast of Cuba after being over land for six hours. A period of dry air entertainment coupled with the continued effects of moderate northerly shear and land interaction briefly degraded and weakened the storm to 60 mph (97 km/h) as it struggled to remain organized throughout August 24 due to the lack of a defined inner-core with the most intense accompanying convection in a prominent band south of the circulation center. However, this turned out to be short-lived as Laura reorganized and restrengthened over the warm waters of the Caribbean before making landfall on the western tip of Cuba in Pinar del Rio province at around 00:00 UTC on August 25. At the time, it had 65 mph (105 km/h) winds and a 998 mbar (29.47 inch) pressure.

== Gulf of Mexico, rapid intensification and landfall ==
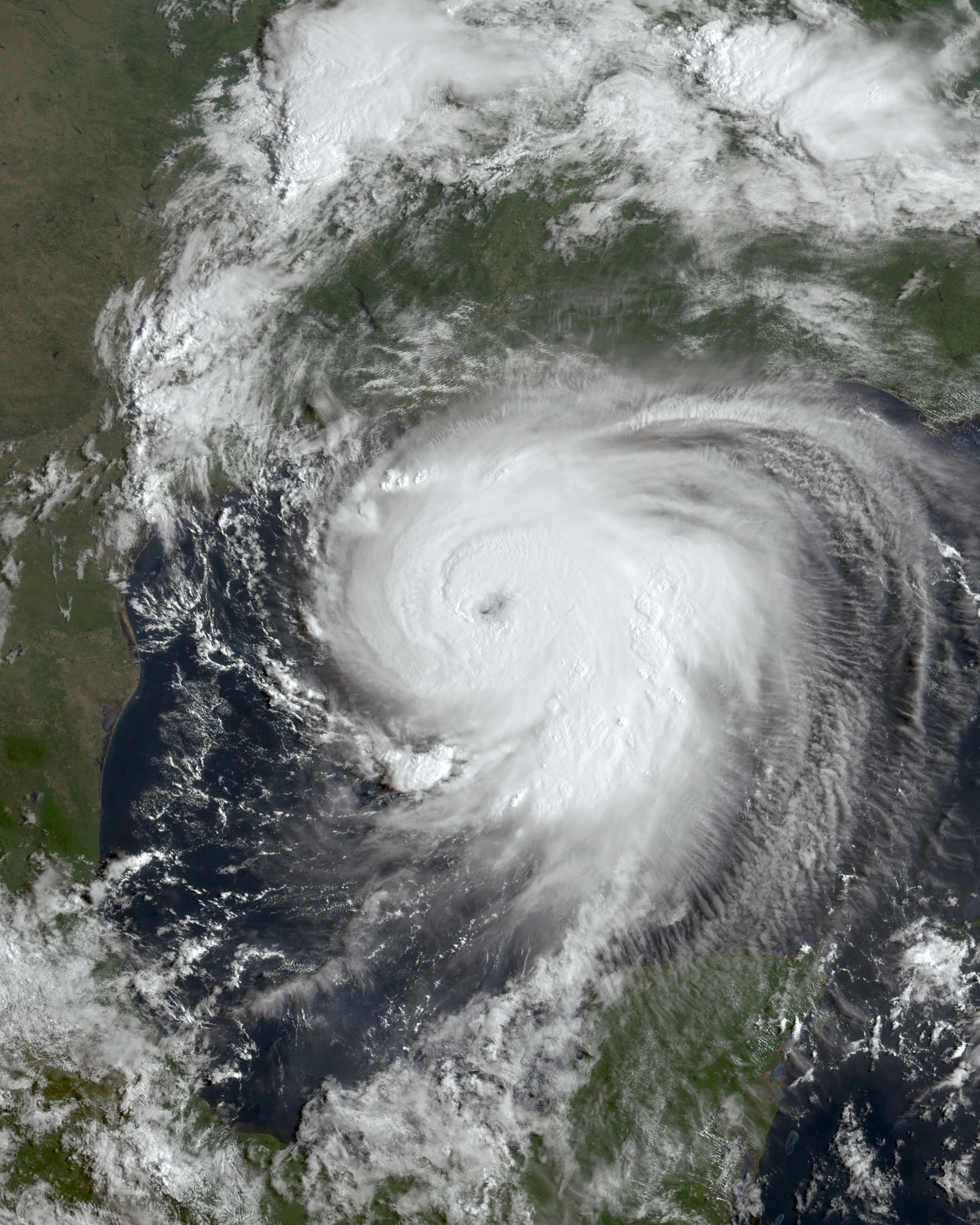
Hurricane Laura rapidly intensifying in the Gulf of Mexico on August 26.

After clearing Cuba, Laura quickly began to gain more organization as it moved west-northwestward into the warm waters of the Gulf of Mexico at a slightly slower speed. The organization was accompanied by steady strengthening, and Laura was upgraded to a Category 1 hurricane at 12:15 UTC on August 25 after hurricane hunters found hurricane-force winds at the surface. Laura then developed an inner core and a central dense overcast (CDO), although it still had a somewhat ragged appearance on satellite imagery. Its intensification continued to be slow due to the presence of some dry air and light northerly wind shear, but this eventually subsided, allowing Laura to become more organized and form a banding-type cloud-filled eye late on August 25 with its sustained winds reaching 85 mph (137 km/h) by 00:00 UTC on August 26. With no more negative factors hindering strengthening and sea surface temperatures around 30 °C, Laura began to rapidly intensify, becoming a Category 2 at 06:00 UTC before achieving Category 3 status just six hours later, making it the first major hurricane of the season. By this time, Laura was beginning to make a gradual northward turn in between the high-pressure ridge over the Southeastern United States and a mid-level low near Oklahoma.

Laura rapidly strengthening before landfall, then rapidly weakening after landfall

As the day progressed, Laura's eye continued to clear out and the deep convection around it intensified and became more symmetric. The satellite presentation continued to improve with the eye becoming better defined, and cloud tops colder than -70 °C in the surrounding ring of deep convection in the developing eyewall. Laura continued to rapidly strengthen that afternoon and reached Category 4 intensity at 18:00 UTC. The hurricane's eye reached a diameter of 30 mi (48 km) that evening and aircraft reconnaissance indicated it to have acquired sustained winds of 145 mph (233 km/h) by 21:00 UTC; this represented an increase of 65 mph (105 km/h) over a 24-hour period. Laura's structure continued to improve with a very distinct, 25 nautical-mile-wide eye embedded in a symmetric central dense overcast and upper-level outflow becoming well established in all quadrants of the cyclone. As it turned north-northwestward towards the Louisiana coastline, Laura reached its peak intensity at 00:00 UTC on August 27 as a high-end Category 4 hurricane with 1-minute sustained winds 150 mph (240 km/h) and a minimum central pressure of 937 mbar (hPa; 27.67 inHg), as measured by reconnaissance aircraft. At this point, the hurricane was located south of Lake Charles, Louisiana and south-southeast of Port Arthur, Texas by a distance of 120 miles (190 km) each.

Laura's rapid intensification then ended and its intensity more or less leveled off as it approached southwestern Louisiana. Laura also began to experience some shear from the low to its west, which restricted its outflow on its west side and its pressure began to fluctuate. However, Laura continued to have a very impressive appearance on satellite imagery with a well-defined eye and circular rain bands. Turning almost due north, Laura made its final landfall near Cameron, Louisiana around 06:00 UTC with 150 mph (240 km/h) winds and a pressure of 939 mbars (27.73 inches). The wind speed made Laura the first Category 4 hurricane to ever hit southwestern Louisiana since the 1856 Last Island hurricane as well as the strongest hurricane to hit the state since Hurricane Camille in 1969 (which produced Category 5 conditions over the southeastern portion of the state). Forecasters at the NHC described the system as "a ferocious looking hurricane with a clear circular eye, an intense eyewall, and tightly-coiled surrounding spiral bands."

== Dissipation ==
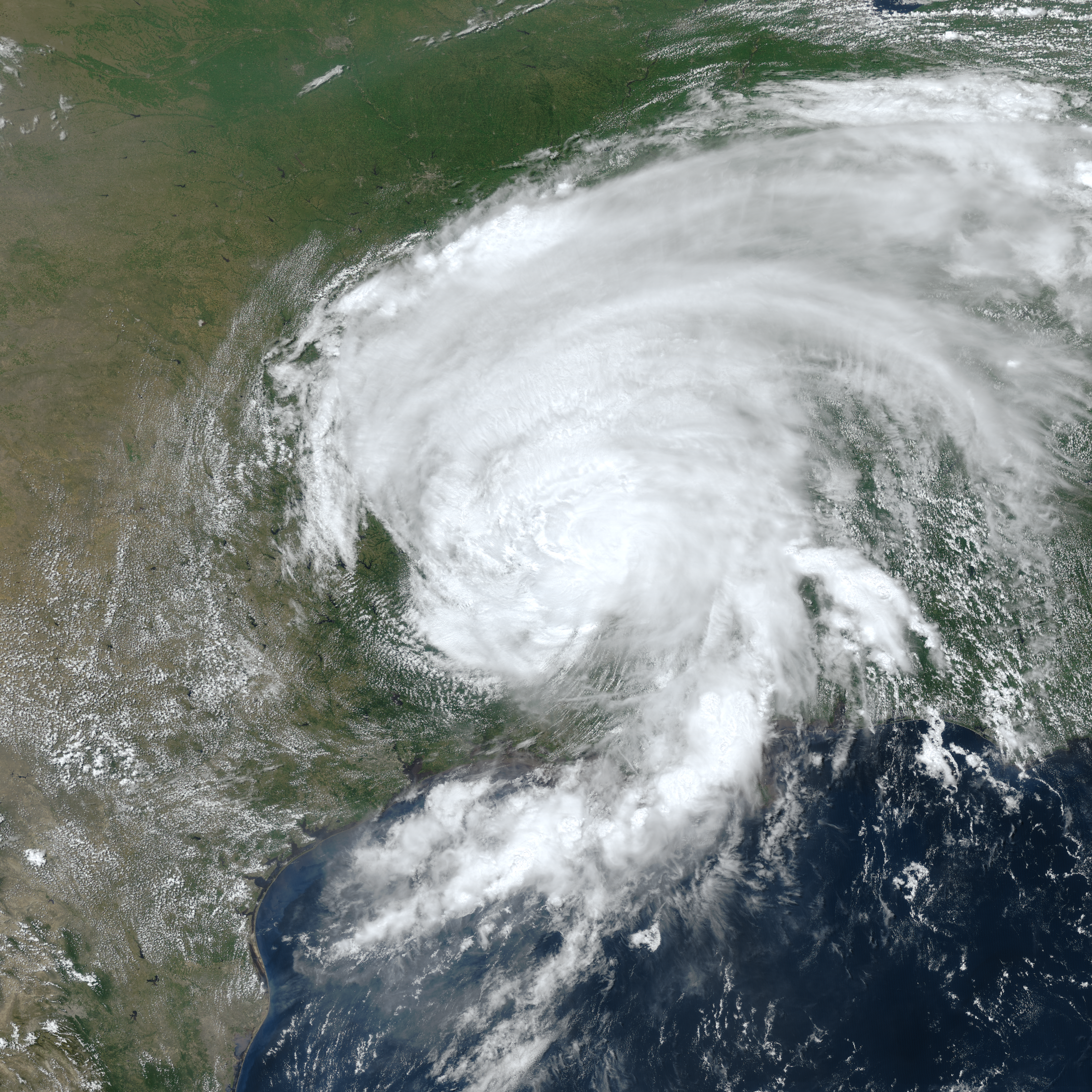
Laura moving over Northwestern Louisiana an hour after being downgraded to a tropical storm on August 27.

After landfall, Laura continued to move northward through the western side of Louisiana. It passed just west of Lake Charles, Louisiana while still at Category 4 intensity with sustained winds at the Lake Charles Regional Airport reaching 95 mph (153 km/h) with gusts up to 132 mph (212 km/h). Despite this, Laura was already beginning to quickly weaken and its winds dropped to Category 3 intensity halfway between De Quincy and Oretta at 09:00 UTC before weakening to below major hurricane strength north of Singer just an hour later. Steadily turning more northeastward, Laura dropped to Category 1 status south of Natchitoches, Louisiana at 14:00 UTC as its eye filled and its satellite and radar appearance degraded. It weakened further to a tropical storm north of Arcadia at 17:00 UTC before moving into Southern Arkansas, where wind gusts in the state reached nearly 60 mph (97 km/h). Convection around the storm center weakened further as the storm passed just east of Little Rock. Laura was downgraded to a tropical depression shortly after that at 03:00 UTC on August 28 and the responsibilities for issuing advisories on the storm was handed off to the Weather Prediction Center (WPC) since there was still a flood threat.

Laura then accelerated as it turned northeastward and then east-northeastward as it began to lose tropical characteristics ahead of an approaching trough from the west. It moved through Southeastern Missouri and turned eastward into Kentucky before becoming a remnant low at 06:00 UTC on August 29. The WPC then issued its final advisory three hours later while the low was over Head of Grassy as the flood threat was generally over. The low continued eastward through West Virginia and Extreme Northern Virginia into Maryland before being absorbed by another low centered near the Great Lakes by 12:00 UTC.

== See also ==
- List of Category 4 Atlantic hurricanes
- 2020 Atlantic hurricane season
- Hurricane Lili (2002) – Another Category 4 hurricane that took a similar track, although it rapidly weakened before landfall.
- Meteorological history of Hurricane Gustav – Another category 4 hurricane that took a similar track in 2008
- Hurricane Isaac (2012) – Category 1 hurricane that struck Louisiana after moving through the Caribbean as a tropical storm
- Effects of Hurricane Laura in Louisiana
