= Powhatan, Louisiana =

- Village
- Village of Powhatan
- Location of Powhatan in Natchitoches Parish, Louisiana.

- Location of Louisiana in the United States Powhatan, Louisiana (the United States)
- Coordinates: 31°52′26″N 93°12′00″W
- Country: United States
- States: Louisiana
- Parish: Natchitoches

Area
  - Total: 0.54 sq mi (1.39 km^{2})
  - Land: 0.54 sq mi (1.39 km^{2})
  - Water: 0 sq mi (0.00 km^{2})

Population (2020)
  - Total: 101
  - Rank: NC: 9th
  - Density: 187.6/sq mi (72.43/km^{2})
- Time zone: UTC-6 (CST)
  - Summer (DST): UTC-5 (CDT)
- Area code: 318
- FIPS code: 22-62245

Powhatan is a village in Natchitoches Parish, Louisiana, United States. As of the 2020 census, Powhatan had a population of 101. It is part of the Natchitoches Micropolitan Statistical Area.

== Geography ==
Powhatan is located at 31°52′26″N 93°12′0″W (31.874012, -93.200083). It is approximately ten miles west of the city of Natchitoches, along the Red River.

According to the United States Census Bureau, the village has a total area of 0.5 square miles (1.3 km^{2}), all land.

== Demographics ==
Historical population
Census	Pop.	Note	%±
1970	277		—
1980	279		0.7%
1990	147		−47.3%
2000	141		−4.1%
2010	135		−4.3%
2020	101		−25.2%
2025 (est.)	100	▼	−1.0%
U.S. Decennial Census

=== 2020 census ===
Powhatan village, Louisiana – Racial and ethnic composition Note: the US Census treats Hispanic/Latino as an ethnic category. This table excludes Latinos from the racial categories and assigns them to a separate category. Hispanics/Latinos may be of any race.
Race / Ethnicity (NH = Non-Hispanic)	Pop 2000	Pop 2010	Pop 2020	% 2000	% 2010	% 2020
White alone (NH)	21	28	23	14.89%	20.74%	22.77%
Black or African American alone (NH)	111	94	73	78.72%	69.63%	72.28%
Native American or Alaska Native alone (NH)	0	1	0	0.00%	0.74%	0.00%
Asian alone (NH)	1	0	0	0.71%	0.00%	0.00%
Native Hawaiian or Pacific Islander alone (NH)	0	0	0	0.00%	0.00%	0.00%
Other race alone (NH)	1	5	0	0.71%	3.70%	0.00%
Mixed race or Multiracial (NH)	7	0	2	4.96%	0.00%	1.98%
Hispanic or Latino (any race)	0	7	3	0.00%	5.19%	2.97%
Total	141	135	101	100.00%	100.00%	100.00%

=== 2000 census ===
As of the census of 2000, there were 141 people, 55 households, and 36 families residing in the village. The population density was 258.8 inhabitants per square mile (99.9/km^{2}). There were 81 housing units at an average density of 148.7 per square mile (57.4/km^{2}). The racial makeup of the village was 14.89% White, 78.72% African American, 0.71% Asian, 0.71% from other races, and 4.96% from two or more races.

There were 55 households, out of which 18.2% had children under the age of 18 living with them, 30.9% were married couples living together, 25.5% had a female householder with no husband present, and 34.5% were non-families. 32.7% of all households were made up of individuals, and 21.8% had someone living alone who was 65 years of age or older. The average household size was 2.56 and the average family size was 3.36.

In the village, the population was spread out, with 23.4% under the age of 18, 14.2% from 18 to 24, 14.2% from 25 to 44, 27.7% from 45 to 64, and 20.6% who were 65 years of age or older. The median age was 43 years. For every 100 females, there were 98.6 males. For every 100 females age 18 and over, there were 86.2 males.

The median income for a household in the village was $16,667, and the median income for a family was $17,250. Males had a median income of $12,500 versus $16,250 for females. The per capita income for the village was $9,488. There were 29.7% of families and 40.2% of the population living below the poverty line, including 64.0% of under eighteens and 17.4% of those over 64.

== Climate ==
Climate is characterized by relatively high temperatures and evenly distributed precipitation throughout the year. The Köppen Climate Classification subtype for this climate is "Cfa". (Humid Subtropical Climate).

Climate data for Powhatan
Month	Jan	Feb	Mar	Apr	May	Jun	Jul	Aug	Sep	Oct	Nov	Dec	Year
Mean daily maximum °C (°F)	16 (61)	18 (64)	22 (71)	25 (77)	29 (84)	32 (89)	33 (91)	33 (91)	31 (87)	27 (80)	22 (71)	17 (63)	25 (77)
Mean daily minimum °C (°F)	5 (41)	7 (44)	11 (51)	14 (57)	19 (66)	22 (72)	23 (74)	23 (74)	21 (69)	15 (59)	10 (50)	6 (43)	15 (58)
Average precipitation mm (inches)	140 (5.5)	84 (3.3)	89 (3.5)	91 (3.6)	150 (6.1)	150 (6.1)	130 (5.1)	120 (4.8)	150 (6.0)	99 (3.9)	120 (4.6)	120 (4.6)	1,450 (57.2)
Source: Weatherbase
