= Sidney Barthelemy =

American politician (born 1942)

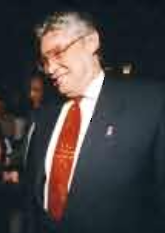

58th Mayor of New Orleans
- In office May 5, 1986 – May 2, 1994
- Preceded by: Ernest Morial
- Succeeded by: Marc Morial

65th President of the National League of Cities
- In office 1991
- Preceded by: Bob Bolen
- Succeeded by: Glenda Hood

Member of the New Orleans City Council
- In office 1978–1986
- Preceded by: Joseph V. DiRosa
- Succeeded by: Dorothy Mae Taylor

Member of the Louisiana Senate from the 4th district
- In office 1974–1978
- Preceded by: Adrian Guy Duplantier, Sr.
- Succeeded by: Henry Braden

Personal details
- Born: Sidney John Barthelemy; March 17, 1942 (age 84) New Orleans, Louisiana, U.S.
- Party: Democratic
- Children: Sidney Barthelemy II

Sidney John Barthelemy (born March 17, 1942) is a former American political figure. The second African American to hold the New Orleans mayoral chair, he was a member of the Louisiana State Senate from 1974 to 1978 and a member at-large of the New Orleans City Council from 1978 to 1986. He served as mayor of New Orleans from 1986 to 1994. He is a member of the Democratic Party.

== Biography ==
=== Early life and education ===
Barthelemy was born on March 17, 1942, in New Orleans, LA and was the third of six children in a Creole family. He grew up in the Seventh Ward, and attended Corpus Christi Elementary School and St. Augustine High School (New Orleans), run by the Josephites.

He then sought to enter the priesthood with the Josephites, studying at Epiphany Apostolic Junior College in Newburgh, New York, and then St. Joseph Seminary in Washington, D.C., where he received a Bachelor of Arts degree in philosophy and pursued graduate study in Theology. While in seminary, he worked summers as a laborer in a stevedoring company.

=== Career ===
In 1967, having made the decision not to enter the priesthood, Barthelemy returned to New Orleans and became an administrative assistant in the office of Total Community Action. In 1968, Barthelemy married Michaele Thibideau. From 1969 to 1972 he was director of the Parent Child Center of Family Health, Inc. During these years he also completed a Master of Social Work degree at Tulane University in New Orleans, worked part-time for the Urban League of Greater New Orleans and assisted with various political campaigns, joining COUP, a political organization based in the 7th Ward of New Orleans.

From 1972 to 1974 Barthelemy was Director of the Department of Welfare under Mayor Moon Landrieu. Backed by COUP, Barthelemy was elected in 1974 to one term in the Louisiana State Senate from District 4; he was the first African-American to serve in that body since Reconstruction. While he served in the Legislature, he also joined Xavier University as assistant director of the Urbinvolve Program and as an instructor in the Department of Sociology and became an adjunct faculty member in the Applied Health Sciences Department, Maternal and Child Health Section, of Tulane University.

In 1978 Barthelemy was elected to an at-large seat on the New Orleans City Council, a position he held for two terms. While in the council, Barthelemy become known for his longstanding rivalry with Mayor Ernest "Dutch" Morial. In 1979, Barthelemy was elected to the state Senate, defeating a white incumbent who had held the seat for sixteen years. He defeated Bill Jefferson in the 1986 mayoral election to succeed Morial. On May 5, 1986, Barthelemy began his first term as mayor of New Orleans.

==== Election of 1986 ====
Sidney Barthelemy first set his sights on becoming mayor of New Orleans in 1982, when he was reelected to the city council. Barthelemy seemed the complete opposite of his fiery predecessor Ernest Morial, who had something of a "will of iron". Barthelemy was more relaxed in demeanor. Not allowed to run for a third term as mayor, Morial supported Barthelemy's runoff opponent in Jefferson. Eliminated in the primary was former state Representative Sam A. LeBlanc, III, who finished with a strong 25 percent of the vote. The runoff between Barthelemy and Jefferson was the first in which both contenders were African Americans. Many African Americans felt as though Barthelemy was concentrating his focus on white-collar businesses. Barthelemy received 58 percent of the total votes cast but only 43 percent of the black vote. He won 86 percent of the vote cast by the dwindling number of white voters in the city. Oddly, in contrast to 1986, Barthelemy won reelection in 1990 with 86 percent of the black vote but only 23 percent of the white vote.

==== Mayoralty ====
First elected in 1986, Barthelemy became the second African American mayor of New Orleans with 58% of the vote. Barthelemy's mayoralty began under difficult circumstances. Federal government revenue sharing to municipalities had been progressively reduced from 1981 onwards, and had ended by the time Barthelemy took office in 1986. Annual funding grants from federal and state sources to New Orleans city government decreased from around $40 million a year to less than $6 million a year between 1984 and 1989. A regional economic slump, the so-called Oil Bust added to these budget woes. Louisiana's energy-dependent economy, already slowing as the price of oil declined from its 1980 high point, was pummeled in early 1986 by a sudden collapse in price per barrel from over $27 to less than $10. With the state's economy in crisis, the unemployment rate in the city climbed to over ten percent and the city government's budget deficit reached $30 million. To solve this, Barthelemy worked with the city council and developed a plan to dig the city out of the deficit. This plan involved cutting costs, raising fees, and privatizing operations, in the course of which over 1,000 city workers lost their jobs.

Taking a less hands-on approach to economic development than his predecessor, Barthelemy preferred to let the private sector be the primary engine of growth. This preference in favor of for-profit actors extended to affordable housing issues, highlighted by Barthelemy's proposal to privatize and demolish much of the city's public housing. The plan was received with great skepticism among community activists and ultimately abandoned. Though Barthelemy took a pro-business stance, his unfocused, laissez-faire approach to attacking the city's problems was harmful in the post-Oil Bust period; it was during his and his successor's mayoralties that New Orleans lost much of its remaining attractiveness as a center for corporate white collar employment. As recently as the late 1970s and early 1980s, downtown New Orleans had experienced a building boom, with multiple office towers constructed to house the headquarters, or large regional offices, for companies such as Freeport-McMoRan, Pan American Life Insurance, Exxon, Chevron, Gulf Oil, Amoco, Mobil, Murphy Oil and Texaco. In the mid-80s these firms, along with other large employers such as Royal Dutch Shell, Louisiana Land and Exploration and McDermott International, employed thousands of white collar workers downtown, with thousands more employed by others providing services to them. Out of the above group, only Shell and Pan American Life Insurance remain as significant employers in downtown New Orleans today. Though Barthelemy probably couldn't have averted the consolidation of Big Oil white collar employment to Houston, he was unsuccessful in creating an economic climate sufficiently conducive to the growth of replacement white collar employers downtown, or elsewhere in the city. A big disappointment occurred in 1988, when defense and space contractor Martin Marietta lost its bid to construct the crew modules for NASA's Space Station Freedom. Martin Marietta would have fabricated the space station hardware at its Michoud Assembly Facility in Eastern New Orleans, already the manufacturing location of the Space Shuttle's external tank. The contract, won by Boeing, resulted in thousands of jobs created at that company's chosen assembly site, Huntsville, Alabama. More disappointment followed the creation of the Metrovision regional economic development partnership, as that body largely failed to diversify or attract additional investment to Metro New Orleans' economy.

Barthelemy's administration was not without economic development successes, as he managed to bring additional investment to New Orleans East, most notably by attracting the giant Pick 'n Save distribution center to the New Orleans Regional Business Park (then known as the Almonaster-Michoud Industrial District). The Pick 'n Save project embodied the city's renewed efforts to leverage the existing infrastructure of the Port of New Orleans, then experiencing a resurgence under the leadership of Ron Brinson, by attracting modern warehousing and distribution facilities to the city. In the wake of the Oil Bust, however, the Barthelemy administration most forcefully advocated for the continued development of New Orleans' tourist and convention industry. Tourism was the only sector of the city's economy to exhibit meaningful growth under Barthelemy. Several high-profile wins occurred, including attracting the Republican National Convention to the city in 1988 and the NCAA Final Four tournament in 1993. Barthelemy also oversaw the opening of the Aquarium of the Americas, the Riverfront streetcar line, the New Orleans Centre and Riverwalk downtown malls, and encouraged the first expansion of the Ernest N. Morial Convention Center (then known as the New Orleans Convention Center).

In administering city government, Barthelemy managed to gradually eliminate the $30 million budget deficit he inherited in 1986, but his methods of raising revenue - attempting to impose an "earnings tax" on the personal income of suburbanites who worked within the city limits, legalization of a land-based casino and riverboat gambling - were controversial. He staffed agencies such as the Housing Authority of New Orleans (HANO) and the Regional Transit Authority (RTA) with members of COUP and other political allies.

Other notable narratives of the Barthelemy administration included the visit of Pope John Paul II to New Orleans in 1987, the passage of the controversial "anti-discrimination" ordinance affecting the membership in Carnival krewes, an unsuccessful, city-sponsored effort to redevelop Louis Armstrong Park into a Tivoli Gardens-style recreation park/amusement center, an unsuccessful proposal to construct a new international airport in New Orleans East, in what later became the Bayou Sauvage National Wildlife Refuge, the post-World's Fair gentrification and redevelopment of the downtown Warehouse District, and the securing of funding for a new sports arena next to the Superdome. Consistent with the city's increasing economic tilt to tourism and the cultural economy, Barthelemy's mayoralty also supported a large addition to the New Orleans Museum of Art, in which the museum attained its present size, as well as the creation of the Louisiana Children's Museum in the Warehouse District. Plans to re-use portions of the former Canadian Pavilion of the World's Fair, including its IMAX theater, as a new Louisiana Science Museum came to nothing, however.

Throughout his political career, Barthelemy carried a reputation as a quiet and mild-tempered politician, in marked contrast to his fiery predecessor Dutch Morial, and to typical New Orleans politicians in general. His critics interpreted this as a sign of passivity and poor leadership. Under his mayoralty, the city's population declined significantly, the crime rate increased dramatically, the murder rate increasing along with the amount of drug use. The performance of the city's public school system continued to erode as well - though in fairness the schools were controlled by the Orleans Parish School Board. National trends were also unfavorable to cities during Barthelemy's mayoralty; New Orleans was far from alone in grappling with economic stagnation and rising crime. Still, many of the alleged deficiencies of the Barthelemy administration were already acknowledged as fact by the public by the end of Barthelemy's first term. His re-election campaign in 1990 was marked by widespread criticism of his administration, and of his perceived lack of leadership - but Barthelemy managed to defeat his challenger Donald Mintz in a runoff election in which Barthelemy received 55% of the vote.

1993 marked a low point in his mayoralty, as that year witnessed the destruction of the old Canal streetcar barn, listed on the National Register of Historic Places, and at the time the oldest surviving streetcar barn in the country.

Later that year, Barthelemy was responsible for bringing a little-known statewide political perk to the attention of voters. At his son's graduation ceremony from Brother Martin High School, it was announced that he would be receiving the "Mayor's Academic Scholarship to Tulane University." This drew a mixed reaction from the crowd in attendance. The next day, the story was featured on the local news in New Orleans. By the end of the week, the story was the talk of the state, and it was revealed that in addition to the Mayor, all members of the Louisiana Legislature could grant scholarships to Tulane University. Louisiana legislators were permitted to award the scholarships to anyone they saw fit, provided that the nominee was a bona fide citizen and resident of the district or parish and "shall comply with the requirements for admission established" by the university's board. Through further investigation, it was revealed that politicians regularly gave these scholarships to their own family members and to the children of political allies. In some instances, the scholarships were given in exchange for political favors.

Nonetheless, Barthelemy was never viewed with great enmity, a testament to his essentially conciliatory leadership style. Fritz H. Windhorst, who served as a Republican member of the Louisiana State Senate from Jefferson and Orleans parishes from 1972 to 1992, described Barthelemy this way: "Sidney doesn't whine or complain when things go badly…He doesn't threaten people who cross him. Just having him as mayor has sharply reduced the anti-New Orleans feelings in the legislature." Barthelemy was quite self-aware with regard to his temperament, viewing it as a strength and once remarking that, "People tend to underestimate me because I don't bang my fist on the table and jump up and scream...but I know how to get the job done and that's always been my aim — to get things done.".

in 1991, Barthelemy served as president of the National League of Cities.

==== After City Hall ====
Although Barthelemy was the subject of much criticism during his time as mayor, he has more recently benefited from a reassessment of his mayoralty. In 2012, City Councilmember Cynthia Hedge Morrell remarked during an event at Gallier Hall, ""The city of New Orleans would not be where it is today if those tough decisions were not made and you had not had the fortitude to endure the wrath of the media and the wrath of people who did not understand" that "good decisions were being made for the future of our city". As a respected former mayor, Barthelemy joined other former mayors Moon Landrieu and Marc Morial in a meeting on January 7, 2006, with parish presidents from the New Orleans metropolitan area to discuss post-Katrina plans for regional flood protection.

Currently, Sidney Barthelemy is serving as the Director of Governmental Affairs for Historic Restoration, Inc. (HRI Properties), a real estate development group based in New Orleans.

== Citations ==
Ashton, Gayle. "Mayor's runoff: one goal, two contenders." The Times Picayune, February 23, 1986

Donze, Frank. "Sidney Barthelemy, Former New Orleans Mayor, to be Honored." The Times- Picayune 5 Dec. 2011: n. pag. Nola.com. Web. 24 Mar. 2012. former_mayor_sidney_barthelemy.html.

Huey, Perry L. "The Reelection of Sidney Barthelemy as Mayor of New Orleans." PS: Political Science and Politics 23.2 (1990): 156–157. JSTOR. Web. 20

Johnson Publishing Company. "Mayor Sidney Barthelemy: New Orleans' 'Gentle Giant' ." Ebony July 1986: n. pag. Print.

1. Nolan, Bruce. (7 January 2006) One For All, and All For Flood Protection. Times-Picayune

"Sidney John Barthelemy." Who's Who Among African Americans. Detroit: Gale, 2011. Gale Biography In Context. Web. 29 Apr. 2012.

Simerman, John, Eggler, B., Krupa, M. "Sidney Barthelemy Praised for Efforts as New Orleans Mayor ." The Times PIcayune . New Orleans Net LLC, 2012. Web. 27 Feb. 2012. <http://www.nola.com/?politics/?index.ssf/?2012/?01/?sidney_barthelemy_praised_for.html>.

Thesis: L.K. Perkins, "Failing the Race: A Historical Assessment of New Orleans Mayor Sidney Barthelemy, 1986-1994." Louisiana State University. Aug. 2005. Web. 26 Feb. 2012. <http://etd.lsu.edu/?docs/?available/?etd-07112005-133748/?unrestricted/?Perkins_thesis.pdf>.

Whelan, Robert, Alma Young, and Mickey Lauria. Urban Regimes and Racial Politics: New Orleans during the Barthelemy Years. University of New Orleans, CUPA Working Paper, 1991

Louisiana State Senate
Preceded by Adrian G. Duplantier	Louisiana State Senator from District 4 (Orleans Parish); Sidney Barthelemy; 1974–1978	Succeeded by Henry Braden
Political offices
Preceded by Joseph DiRosa	Councilmember at Large, New Orleans; Sidney Barthelemy; 1978–1986	Succeeded by Dorothy Mae Taylor
Preceded by Ernest Morial	Mayor of New Orleans; Sidney Barthelemy; May 5, 1986 – May 2, 1994	Succeeded by Marc Morial
