= New Orleans Lower Central Business District =

- U.S. National Register of Historic Places
- U.S. Historic district
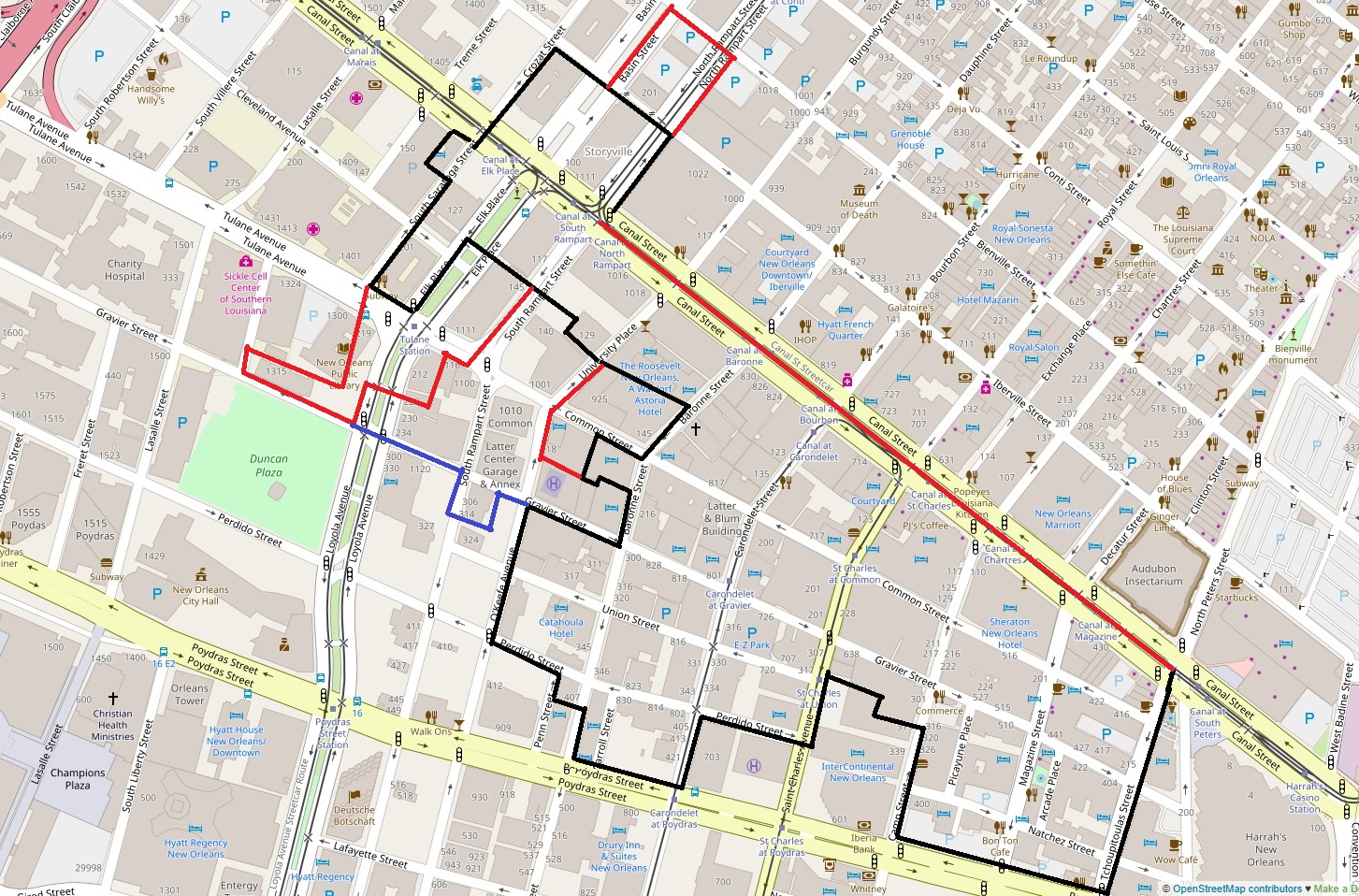
- Lower Central Business District with original (black) increase I (red) and increase II (blue) boundaries

- Location within Louisiana Location within the United States
- Location: Roughly bounded by Canal, Tchoupitoulas, Poydras, O'Keefe, Common and S. Saratoga, New Orleans, Louisiana
- Area: 72 acres (29 ha) (original)
- Built: 1830 - 1941 (original)
- Architect: Multiple
- Architectural style: Classical Revival, Greek Revival, Italianate
- NRHP reference No.: 91000825 (original); 06000110 (increase)

Significant dates
- Added to NRHP: June 24, 1991
- Boundary increase: February 9, 2006

The New Orleans Lower Central Business District is a historic district in New Orleans, Louisiana, which was listed on the National Register of Historic Places (NRHP) in 1991. It may be referred to as Lower Central Business District. Along with the NRHP-listed New Orleans Upper Central Business District to the south, across the redeveloped Poydras Street, it is included within the larger New Orleans Central Business District area. To the north, between N. Peters and N. Rampart, the district borders the historic, NRHP-listed Vieux Carre, which is a U.S. National Historic Landmark.

The original 1991 listing is roughly bounded by Canal, Tchoupitoulas, Poydras, O'Keefe, Common and S. Saratoga. It included 251 contributing buildings dating from 1830 to 1941and 32 non-contributing buildings on 72 acres (29 ha). It included Classical Revival, Greek Revival, Italianate and other architecture.

The district is almost entirely commercial. The only surviving residence in the district was 824 Canal Street (see photo #4 in 27 photos from 1990), which was designed by architect James Gallier, Sr. for Dr. William Newton Mercer and was built in 1844. It became the Boston Club, a private men's club, in 1884.

The historic NOPSI building, at 317 Baronne Street, was vacant at time of listing but was later renovated and became the NOPSI New Orleans hotel.

After the 2006 boundary increase and modified documentation, the district contained 259 contributing buildings and 31 non-contributing ones. Of these, 15 buildings had previously been individually listed on the National Register.

Separately listed buildings include:

- Hennen Building (1894–95), at 203 Carondelet, designed by Thomas Sully, which was already separately listed on the National Register.
- New Orleans Cotton Exchange Building (1921), at 231 Carondelet St., also separately listed.
- National American Bank Building (1929), at 200 Carondelet, also separately listed.
- the Beaux Arts Orpheum Theatre (1918), at 125-129 University Pl., also separately listed.
- Macheca Building (1901), at 828 Canal St., also separately listed.

In 2014, it was proposed that the district be further expanded.

The Louisiana state site includes NRHP nomination and map for the proposed boundary increase.

Documentation about the district published by the State of Louisiana's Division of Historic Preservation overlaps with documentation published by the National Park Service, but includes additional photos and maps.

National Park Service, at end of 2014, listed the boundary increase II as pending.

Additional documentation about the Lower Central Business District was approved by the National Register on January 20, 2015.

- New Orleans Lower Central Business District (Boundary Increase)
- U.S. National Register of Historic Places
- U.S. Historic district
- Location within Louisiana Location within the United States
- Location: Approx. Rampart, Tulane, Loyola, Gravier, O'Keefe and Common, New Orleans, Louisiana
- Coordinates: 29°57′5″N 90°3′56″W
- Area: 5 acres (2.0 ha)
- Architect: Benson, Reihl; Goldstein, Parham, Labouisse et al.
- Architectural style: International Style
- NRHP reference No.: 06000110
- Added to NRHP: February 9, 2006

In 2006 the area of the New Orleans Lower Central Business District was increased to include other historic buildings, and the amendment also identified some buildings as contributing which had been deemed non-contributing previously, based on additional information. The boundary increase added nine contributing buildings, including the New Orleans Public Library, and three non-contributing building, as well as updating four buildings to be considered contributing. One of those now considered contributing is the Joy Theater (1946), at 1200 Canal. The contributing buildings included International Style architecture, and included buildings built as late as 1956, i.e. up to just 50 years old.
