= Fortune Riard =

Louisiana reconstruction era American politician

Louisiana State Senate
- In office 1876–1878

Personal details
- Born: 1832/3 Louisiana
- Died: February 28, 1889
- Party: Republican

Alexander Fortune Riard (1832/3 – February 28, 1889), was a carpenter, merchant, lawyer and state legislator who served in the Louisiana State Senate from 1876 until 1878.

== Biography ==
Riard was born free in Louisiana in 1832 or 1833 and was described as mulatto. He was educated in France where he also served as a naval officer.

He was a Republican and was also the Lafayette agent for the New Orleans Republican newspaper which was the official journal of the Republican party.

Riard first unsuccessfully ran for the Louisiana State Senate in 1868 contesting the seat for the 10th senatorial district. In 1872 the Republican party nominated Riard again to run for the Senate against T. C. Anderson who ran as an independent and again was unsuccessful.

He was a delegate to the Louisiana Constitutional Convention in 1868 representing Lafayette Parish, Louisiana and was a signatory to the final published constitution. Also in 1868 he had received threats and was forced to flee from the Lafayette Parish for a while. Riard owned property in the parish.

In the 1870 United States census he was listed as a carpenter. He later became a merchant in New Orleans owning and operating Riard's Employer's and Servants Intelligence Bureau and Claim Agency The agency was located at 184 Poydras Street, New Orleans and became the biggest in Louisiana. He obtained a law degree from Straight University in 1876. He was admitted to practice law in Louisiana in May 1876 and as a lawyer his agency then qualified as a United States Claim Agency.

He was a naval officer in New Orleans in 1877 and the Rutherford B. Hayes administration wanted to remove him asserting he was "unable to read or write" as he signed with an X, although others declared he was not illiterate.

Riard was elected to serve on the Louisiana State Senate in 1876 and served until 1878. He was elected again to the senate in 1880 but did not take his seat. The election was challenged stating that R. S. Perry had received more votes and Riard was not eligible as he had not been a resident of the 11th senatorial district at the time of the election. The vote went to Perry 25 yays to 5 nays and Perry was sworn in and seated.

He was appointed as a deputy revenue collector for the internal revenue in 1881.

Riard died at his home in Lafayette on February 28, 1889.

== See also ==
- African American officeholders from the end of the Civil War until before 1900
