= Hancock Whitney Center =

Tallest building in both the city of New Orleans and the state of Louisiana

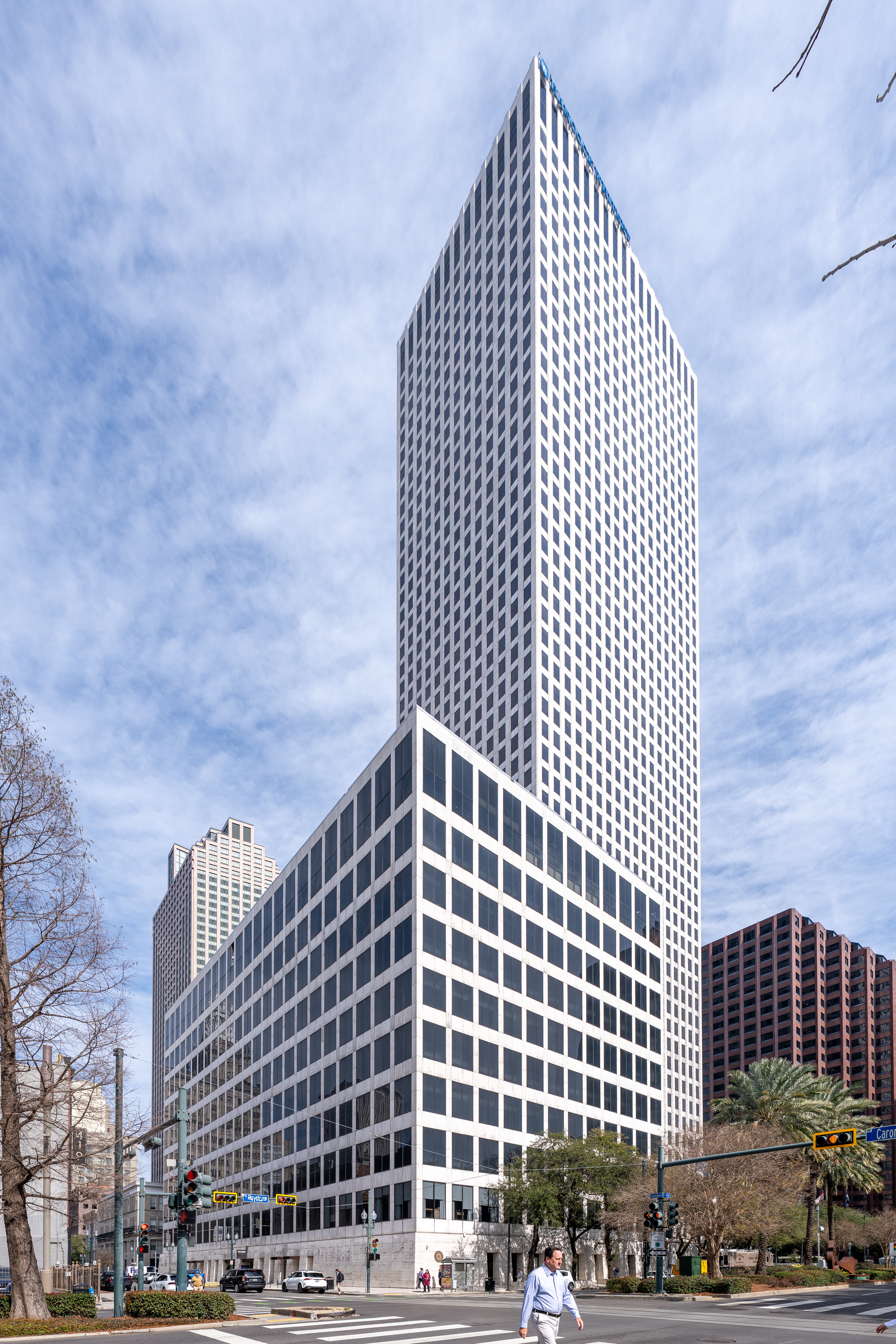
- The Hancock Whitney Center in 2026
- Interactive map of the Hancock Whitney Center area
- Former names: One Shell Square

General information
- Type: Commercial offices
- Architectural style: International Style
- Location: 701 Poydras Street; New Orleans, Louisiana
- Coordinates: 29.9502°N 90.0711°W
- Completed: 1972
- Client: Shell USA
- Owner: Hertz Investment Group

Height
- Roof: 697 ft (212 m)

Technical details
- Floor count: 51
- Floor area: Office: 1,256,988 sq ft (116,778.0 m^{2}); Retail: 32,700 sq ft (3,040 m^{2})

Design and construction
- Architect: Skidmore, Owings and Merrill
- Developer: Hines Interests Limited Partnership
- Structural engineer: Fazlur Rahman Khan

Website
- hancockwhitneycenter.com

Hancock Whitney Center, formerly One Shell Square, is a 51-story, 697-foot (212 m) skyscraper designed in the International style by Skidmore, Owings and Merrill, located at 701 Poydras Street in the Central Business District of New Orleans, Louisiana. It is the tallest building in both the city of New Orleans and the state of Louisiana, and is taller than Louisiana's tallest peak, Driskill Mountain. The building is primarily used for leasable office space, with some retail space on the ground level.

The design of the building is very similar to Houston's One Shell Plaza and Denver's Republic Plaza, as well as Rochester's Five Star Bank Plaza, all designed by Skidmore, Owings and Merrill. Hines Interest is the developer of Hancock Whitney Center and Lincoln Property Company. Shell USA is the building's largest tenant. The building was renamed in 2018. It was listed on the National Register of Historic Places that same year.

== Construction and design ==
Hancock Whitney Center was built using a double tube system, with a steel core and a concrete perimeter, and opened for business in 1972. The exterior of the building is clad in Italian travertine (limestone) and bronze glass. There has been concern over the years regarding the limestone's integrity during severe weather such as tropical systems. These fears did not play out during Hurricane Katrina in August 2005 and the building weathered the storm with minimal damage, such as blown out windows and rain damage. The building reopened to tenants in December 2005.

At the time of its completion in 1972, it was the tallest building in the Southeast, surpassing the Wachovia Bank of Georgia Building in Atlanta. It held the title of the Southeast's tallest building until 1976, when the Westin Peachtree Plaza in Atlanta surpassed it. Hancock Whitney Center was the first skyscraper in the South to surpass the 200 meter mark.

== Location ==
Hancock Whitney Center is bounded by Poydras Street to the south, Carondelet Street to the west, Perdido Street to the north, and St. Charles Avenue to the east.

Hancock Whitney Center has its own ZIP code, 70139 surrounded by 70130.

== Branding ==
In August 2017, Hancock-Whitney Bank announced that it would relocate to One Shell Square in 2018. Although Shell is still the largest tenant by space, the building was rebranded as "Hancock Whitney Center."

== See also ==
- List of tallest buildings by U.S. state
- List of tallest buildings in New Orleans
- List of tallest buildings in Louisiana
