= NOPSI New Orleans =

- Interactive map of the NOPSI New Orleans area
- Hotel chain: Preferred Hotels & Resorts

Other information
- Facilities
- NOPSI Hotel
- U.S. Historic district – Contributing property
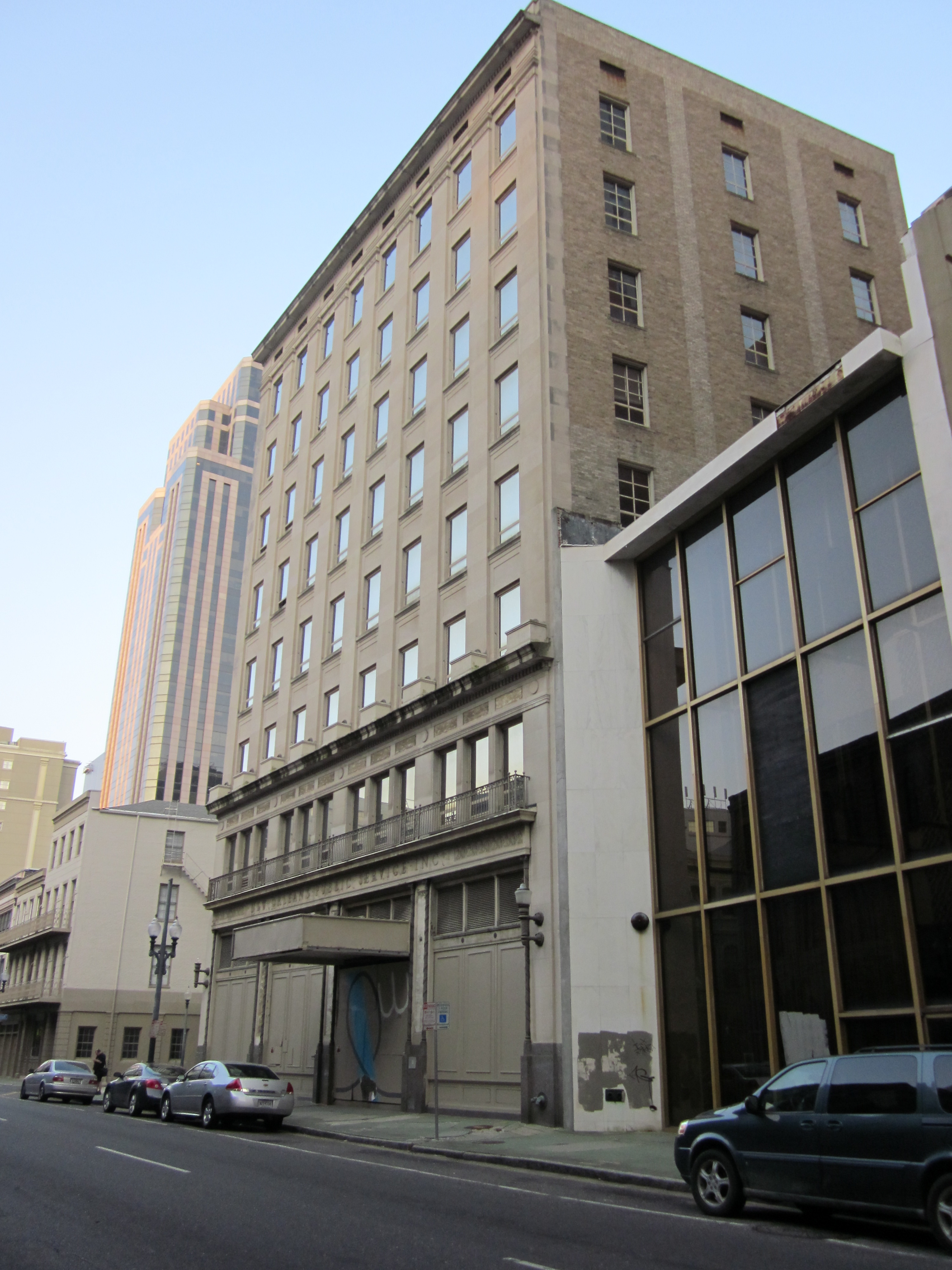
- NOPSI building in 2010, before restoration of ground-floor glass and of the marquee
- Location: 317 Baronne St, New Orleans, Louisiana
- Coordinates: 29.9521°N 90.0729°W
- Part of: New Orleans Lower Central Business District (ID91000825)
- Designated CP: June 24, 1991

NOPSI New Orleans, or the NOPSI Hotel, is a hotel in the historic NOPSI building in downtown New Orleans, Louisiana.

The building is the former headquarters of New Orleans' main utilities company, the New Orleans Public Service Incorporated, which was set up in 1922 to consolidate numerous separate public utilities firms. Its nine-story building was designed by architects Favrot and Livaudais, and was constructed in 1927. The building "displayed some of the finest architectural finishes throughout the whole city. Perhaps the greatest feature was the ornate lobby that resembled the ground floor of a bank."

The NOPSI entity relocated away in 1983, and the building was then vacant for many years. In 1991 it was included as a contributing building in the listing of the New Orleans Lower Central Business District onto the National Register of Historic Places.

Eventually it was converted into the current 217-room hotel, which opened in 2017.

It has been listed by the National Trust for Historic Preservation as a member of the Historic Hotels of America program since 2016.

New Orleans CityBusiness pointed out in 2021 that the renovation was an adaptive reuse project, one of few recent at that time, as suitable properties in New Orleans central business district were simply not available.

It is now a top New Orleans hotel.

The building is located essentially on the northwest corner of the intersection of Union and Baronne Streets. A small rectangular plaza at the very corner, however, makes a notched footprint into the building, so the building's footprint forms a very heavy L-shape around that rectangle. The plaza is walled off from the sidewalks and is part of the NOPSI property. It is just three blocks (0.2 miles (0.32 km) northeast along Baronne to New Orleans' major Canal Street thoroughfare, and then just one block southeast to the beginning of Bourbon Street, noted as a major entrance into the French Quarter.

The building's roof sports an outdoor pool.
