= New Orleans Power Station =

- Country: United States
- Location: New Orleans
- Coordinates: 30°0′40″N 89°56′9″W
- Commission date: May 31, 2020; 5 years ago
- Owner: Entergy New Orleans
- Operator: Entergy New Orleans

Thermal power station
- Primary fuel: Natural gas

Power generation
- Nameplate capacity: 128 megawatts (172,000 hp)

External links
- Website: www.entergy.com/brightfuturenola/new-orleans-power-station/

The New Orleans Power Station is a natural gas–fired electrical power plant in New Orleans. It is operated by Entergy New Orleans and regulated by the New Orleans City Council. It is located at the foot of the Paris Road Bridge in the New Orleans East neighborhood. The plant's reciprocating engine units have a total capacity of 128 megawatts (172,000 hp).

== History ==
In 2017, Entergy proposed a new plant adjacent to Michoud Power Station units 2 and 3, which were commissioned in the 1960s. Entergy promoted the proposed New Orleans Power Station as a peaking power plant. It argued that the plant's black start capability would quickly restore power to part of New Orleans even if damage to all eight transmission lines leading into the city. However, the Alliance for Affordable Energy warned that a storm powerful enough to cause such damage would also severely damage the city's distribution system, limiting the plant's effectiveness in restoring power. Residents of the predominantly Black and Vietnamese-American New Orleans East neighborhood opposed the plant and raised concerns that its location at the confluence of the Mississippi River–Gulf Outlet Canal and Gulf Intracoastal Waterway would make it susceptible to flooding.

Unusually, the New Orleans City Council, not the Louisiana Public Service Commission, has sole authority to regulate retail electricity within the city. Entergy hired a public relations firm that paid actors to attend council meetings in support of the proposal. Entergy was fined $5 million for the practice, but the plant was ultimately approved and funded by consumer rate increases. The Michoud station was decommissioned on June 1, 2016, and the New Orleans Power Station went online on May 31, 2020.

On August 29, 2021, Hurricane Ida made landfall as a Category 4 storm and damaged or destroyed all eight transmission lines leading into New Orleans, creating a blackout for the entire "island" from New Orleans west to LaPlace and south to Venice and Grand Isle. Entergy initially planned to restore critical power to emergency services by generating 230 megawatts at the New Orleans Power Station and 400 megawatts at the Ninemile Point Power Station in Bridge City. However, the entire city went without power for approximately 48 hours until the transmission line extending into the New Orleans area from Slidell was restored to service, bringing in some power from the regional transmission system operated by Midcontinent Independent System Operator. Entergy restored power to 70% of its customers in the City of New Orleans on September 6, 2021, and to 98% of its customers in the City of New Orleans as of September 9, 2021. Entergy did not bring the New Orleans Power Station online until two days after the storm, prompting the city council to launch an investigation. Entergy credits the plant with contributing to the restoration of power in the city and argues that it was more effective to restore the system using the Slidell transmission line and the New Orleans Power Station in tandem than to focus on islanding, which ran the risk of a damaging load imbalance.
