= Poydras Center =

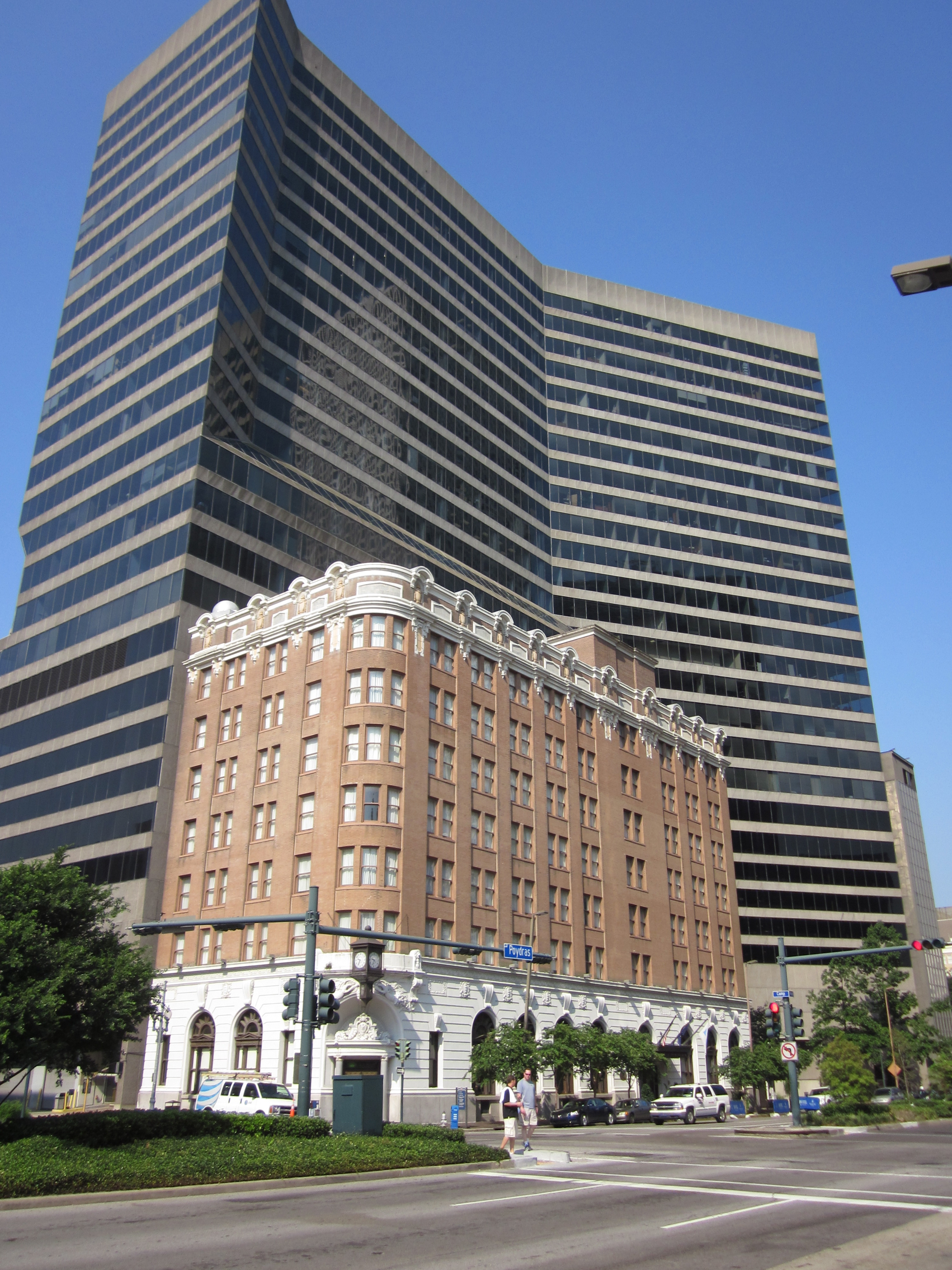
- Poydras Center behind the Whitney National Bank (Poydras Branch) from Poydras near Camp Street

General information
- Type: Office
- Architectural style: Modern
- Location: 650 Poydras Street; New Orleans, LA; United States
- Coordinates: 29.9489703°N 90.0701276°W
- Completed: 1983

Height
- Architectural: 300 feet (91 m)
- Tip: 300 feet (91 m)
- Roof: 300 feet (91 m)

Technical details
- Floor count: 28
- Floor area: Office: 453,000 sq ft (42,100 m^{2})

Design and construction
- Architect(s): Smallwood, Reynolds, Stewart, Stewart & Associates

The Poydras Center is a 28-story, 300 feet (91 m)-tall skyscraper located at 650 Poydras Street at the intersection with St. Charles Avenue in the Central Business District of New Orleans, Louisiana.

== See also ==
- List of tallest buildings in New Orleans
