= Eric George =

American hand surgeon

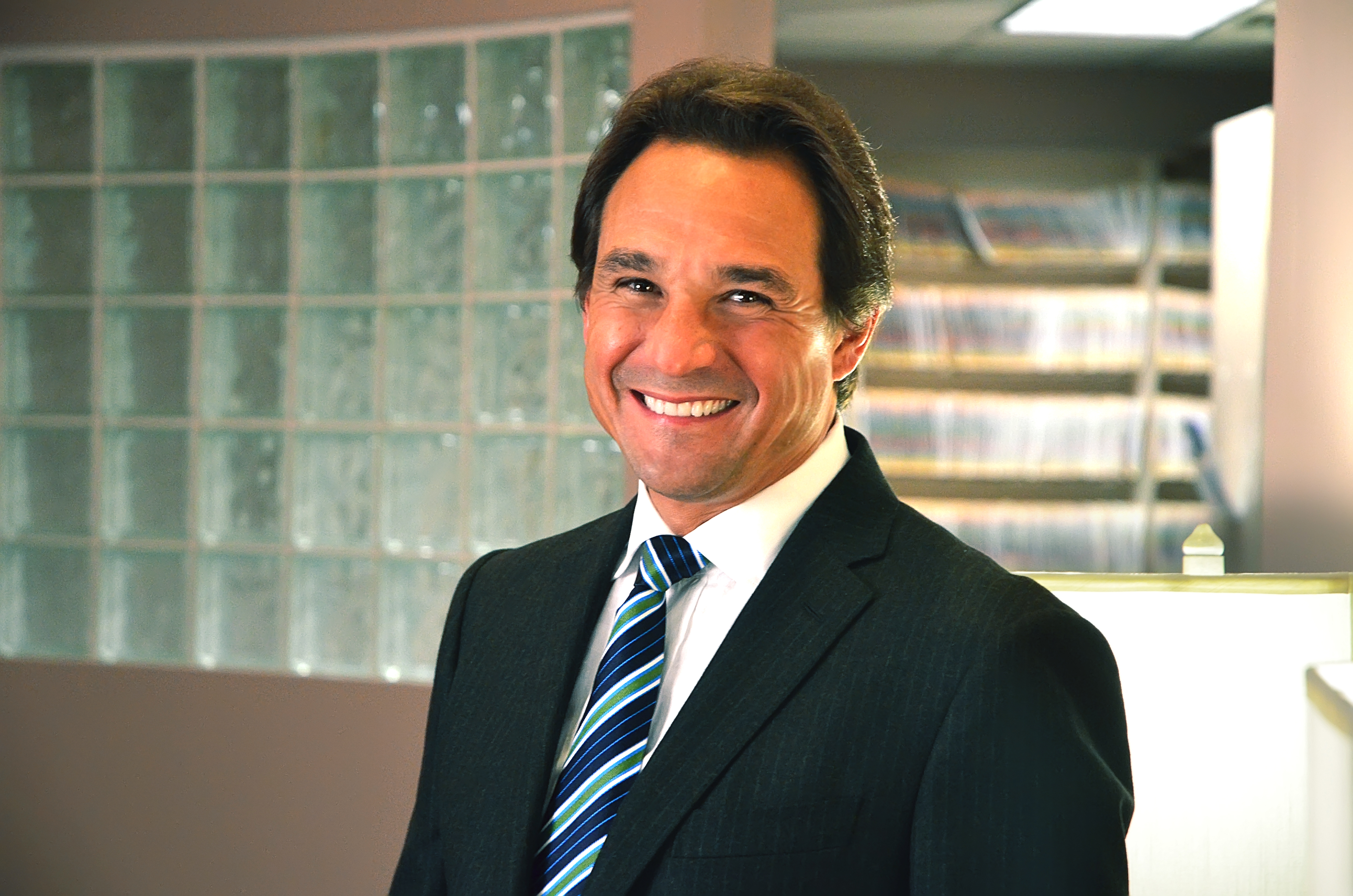
- Education: Marshall University; Michigan State University
- Occupations: Businessman, investor, and medical doctor
- Known for: Hand Center of Louisiana; Omega Hospital
- Spouse: Kimberly Hendrick George

Eric George is an American physician, best known as a hand surgeon. He is the founder and CEO of ERG Enterprises, Omega Hospital and The Hand Center of Louisiana in New Orleans. He is also a venture capitalist, real estate investor, and author.

== Medical career ==
Eric George grew up in Huntington, West Virginia, and graduated from Marshall University with a double major in chemistry and political science. After being accepted to both medical school and law school, George decided to become a medical doctor and was trained in orthopedic hand surgery. George is a graduate of Marshall University's School of Medicine in 1989, completed a General Trauma Surgery Residency at Michigan State University and a Fellowship in Plastic and Reconstructive Surgery at Grand Rapids Area Medical Education Center in Grand Rapids, Michigan. Subsequently, he completed an Orthopedic Hand and Upper Extremity Reconstructive Fellowship at the Mayo Clinic in Phoenix, Arizona. He is board-certified and holds a certificate of Added Qualifications in Surgery of the Hand.

George is currently a Professor of Hand Surgery at the Louisiana State University Health Sciences Center and Tulane University in New Orleans. George has published articles in academic journals including Plastic and Reconstructive Surgery and The American Surgeon.

George founded the Hand Center of Louisiana, a surgical practice based in Metairie, Louisiana. In 2003, George co-founded Omega Hospital, a specialty surgical hospital, and became its CEO. Omega became the first physician-owned hospital in the greater New Orleans area. The luxury hospital focused on improving the patient experience by offering rooms with mini-bars, microwaves, and additional beds for family members to stay overnight. Today, George continues to serve as CEO of the Hand Center of Louisiana, where he works with the Saints and regularly treats NFL and NBA athletes, including Jimmy Graham and Anthony Davis, high-profile celebrities, and professionals in the oil and gas industry, as well as other businesses. George also maintains his role as CEO at Omega Hospital, where he actively practices full-time.

Since 2007, George has appeared in the annual list of Best Doctors®, a national peer-nominated survey of the best physicians across 450 specialties and subspecialties.

In 2017, George became the first surgeon in the US to fit a functional 3D-printed prosthetic onto a patient.

== Business activities ==
George's career as an entrepreneur and investor began in 2006, when he founded and became the CEO of ERG Enterprises, a venture investment firm based in New Orleans. In its early years, ERG made investments in healthcare facilities. That changed in 2009, when it partnered with The Berger Company to purchase the Windsor Court Hotel in New Orleans. While the hotel was owned by London-based Orient Express Hotels at the time, the transaction would return the luxury hotel to local ownership. In 2011 George attempted to purchase the Le Petit Theatre du Vieux Carre when the theatre fell into financial disorder, however his bid wasn't successful.

Under George's direction, ERG Enterprises bought the famed Orpheum Theater in 2013, which suffered significant damage from Hurricane Katrina, shut down, and fell into a state of disrepair. George and fellow investors began plans to restore and enhance the original theater. The upgrade, which took over a year, included an expanded marble lobby, enlarged seating, additional bathrooms, multiple bars, and an auditorium floor that used hydraulics to accommodate the different surface requirements of concerts and events. The grand reopening of the theater occurred August 2015, just in time to commemorate the 10-year anniversary of Hurricane Katrina. In 2020, the theater underwent a second major renovation under George's ownership. The basement of the theater was converted into an underground speakeasy called the Double Dealer, which opened January 24, 2020. In February 2021, the Orpheum celebrated its centennial anniversary. During the same month, it was chosen as the first of six U.S. sites by the World Food Program USA and Street Art for Mankind to feature a mural raising awareness about global hunger.

George's ERG Enterprises also invested in an $18 million renovation project of the Pythian building in New Orleans. In 2015, George and ERG Enterprises acquired the Pythian with Dr. William Bradshaw of Green Coast Enterprises and Crescent City Community Land Trust. They reopened the property in 2017 as an apartment building offering workforce-rate housing, a 20,000 square-foot food hall, office space, and healthcare facilities.

Today, ERG Enterprises owns Windsor Court Hotel, Pontchartrain Hotel, Royal Orleans Hotel, Westin Canal Place, The Frenchmen Hotel, and Thompson Nashville. In 2019, ERG co-developed a property on 300 Rampart Street in New Orleans with plans of opening it as a boutique hotel. Upon completion of the project, George commissioned the painting of a mural on its exterior by street artist Eduardo Kobra. The mural depicts the musician Louis Armstrong and was unveiled on the 118th anniversary of Armstrong’s birth. During the same year, ERG joined Gayle Benson and her investment company GMB Properties, The Berger Company, and Fulcrum Hospitality in acquiring the Hyatt Regency New Orleans, which is largest hotel acquisition in the history of Louisiana. In 2020, the company also purchased the old United Fruit Company building on Saint Charles Avenue.

George is additionally the owner of a pineapple farm in Panama and several assisted-living facilities in the state of Louisiana. He has additionally founded and supplied a grade school in the city of Mombassa, Kenya. As of 2020, his net worth is estimated to be $500 million.

In 2021, ERG Enterprises announced its partnership with LifeCare Properties to open a series of resort-style senior-living facilities in Texas.

== Writing ==
In 2019, George published his first book, We: Ditch the Me Mindset and Change the World. The book focuses on his life experiences as a doctor and entrepreneur, and emphasizes the importance of orienting one's life around other people and making them the primary focus.

Since 2020, George has written several articles in Forbes and Entrepreneur, covering topics related to leadership, entrepreneurship, or business.

== Philanthropy ==
George is an active philanthropist. In 2004, he became the benefactor and namesake of George Cottage at St. Martin's Episcopal School in New Orleans. George and his family also funded and participated in the construction of a new nursery school for an orphanage in Mombasa, Kenya. George has also established the Colonel Aaron C-Dot George Scholarship at Marshall University, as well as the George Family Scholarship Fund at New York University Law School.

== Bibliography ==
=== Selected articles ===
- "Why Rapid Growth Kills Businesses." Forbes. April 2020.
- “Storytelling: Why a Great Narrative Can Grow Your Business.” Forbes. June 2020.
- "The Studious Leader: How Learning Drives Business Innovation.” Forbes. July 2020.
- “Three Attributes to Make Your Team a Competitive Advantage.” Forbes. August 2020.
- “Real Risk vs. Perceived Risk: 2 Factors to Grow Your Business in 2020.” Entrepreneur. November 2020.
- “How B2B Companies Thrive During a Recession.” Forbes. December 2020.
- “The Housing Crisis that Will Hit Home.” Forbes. May 2021.
- "Solving the Dignity Crisis for Older Americans." Entrepreneur. June 2021.
- "How Senior Living Providers Can Become Health Advocates.” Forbes. June 2021.
- "How Smart Technology Could Revolutionize the Senior Living Industry." Forbes. August 2021.
- "How Tech-Savvy Seniors Are Shaking Up Senior Living." Forbes. September 2021.

=== Multimedia ===
- with Sangeeta Badal, Maria Contreras-Sweet, Charles Fred, and Jennifer Maher. “The Science of Business Building.” Gallup. February 20, 2020.
- with David Meltzer. “How This Doctor Expanded His Career Beyond Medicine into Entrepreneurship.” The Playbook. June 4, 2020.

=== Selected podcast appearances ===
- with Jeff Brown. “Ditch the Me Mindset and Change the World.” Read to Lead. February 11, 2020.
- with Nick Bradley. “Improving the Relationship Between Investors and Entrepreneurs.” Scale Up Your Business. April 30, 2020.
- with Dan Cockerell. “The Importance of Healthy Relationships, Empowerment, and Delegation.” Come Rain or Shine. July 22, 2020.
- with Eddie Turner. “The We of Leadership.” Keep Leading. September 24, 2020.
- with Rock Thomas. “From a Surgeon to an Entrepreneur Worth $500 Million with Dr. Eric George.” Rock Your Money, Rock Your Life. December 2, 2020.
