= Orpheum Theater (New Orleans) =

- Orpheum Theatre
- U.S. National Register of Historic Places
- U.S. Historic district – Contributing property
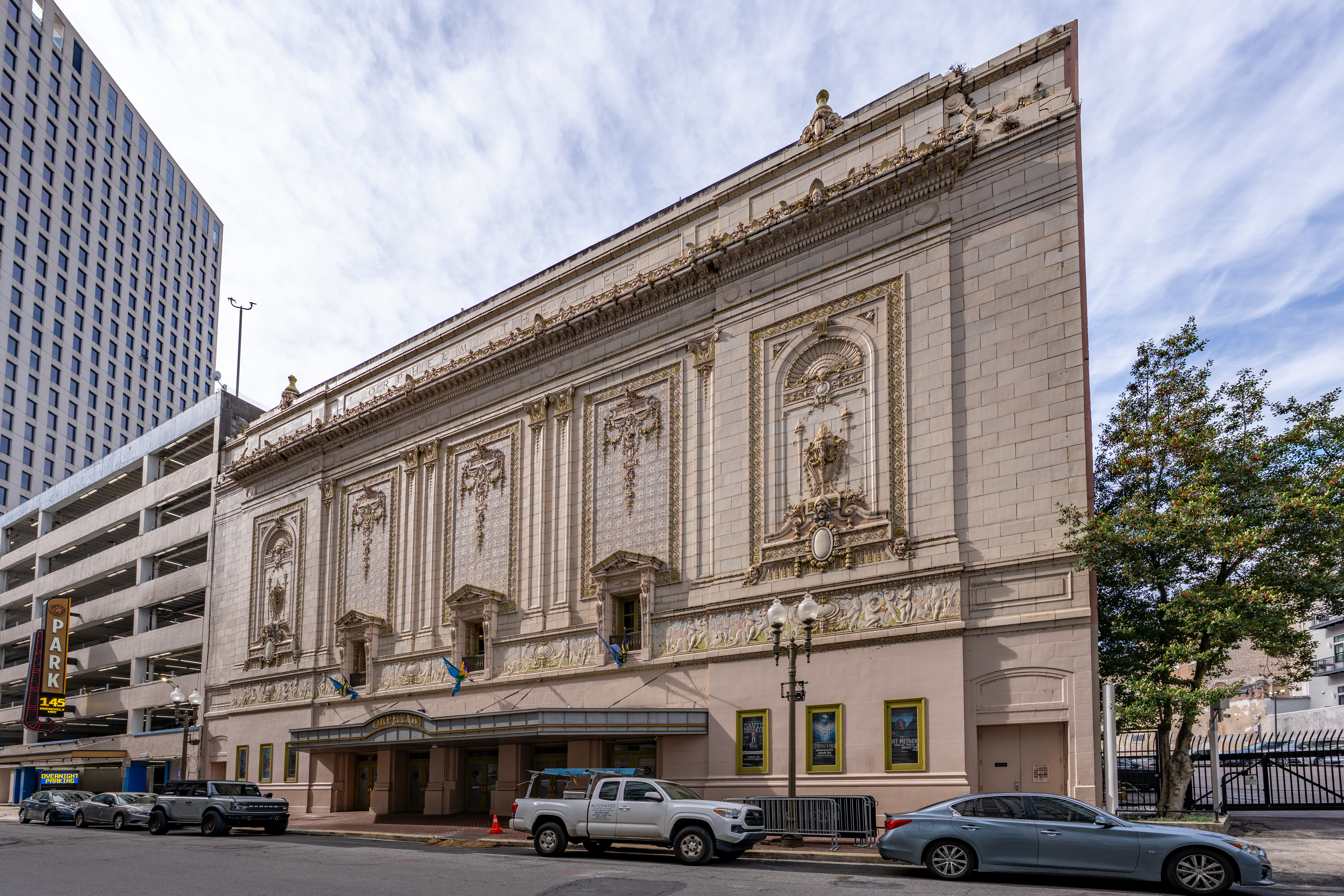
- Orpheum Theater in 2026

- Location within East New Orleans Location within Louisiana Location within the United States
- Location: 125–129 University Pl., New Orleans, Louisiana
- Coordinates: 29°57′16″N 90°4′21″W
- Area: 0.3 acres (0.12 ha)
- Built: 1918
- Architect: G. Albert Lansburgh
- Architectural style: Beaux Arts
- Part of: New Orleans Lower Central Business District (ID91000825)
- NRHP reference No.: 82002787

Significant dates
- Added to NRHP: August 11, 1982
- Designated CP: June 24, 1991

The Orpheum Theater is a theater in the Central Business District of New Orleans, Louisiana.

Also known as the RKO Orpheum, it was designed by G. Albert Lansburgh, built in 1918, and opened for vaudeville in 1921. The Beaux Arts style building has 1,500 seats, and went on to host silent movies, “talkies,” live music and a range of other shows. In 1983, the Orpheum was scheduled for demolition but was acquired by the New Orleans Philharmonic Symphony Orchestra, and underwent a $3 million renovation. It served as the orchestra's home theater until the orchestra's financial demise in 1991. Under new ownership, the Orpheum became the home of the newly formed Louisiana Philharmonic Orchestra (LPO), whose musicians prized the auditorium for its acoustical purity. The theater is an example of "vertical hall" construction, initially built to provide perfect sight lines and acoustics for vaudeville shows which did not have the benefit of amplifiers or modern lighting.

The Orpheum Theater was listed on the National Register of Historic Places in 1982. It was also included in the NRHP listing of the New Orleans Lower Central Business District in 1991. The theater was severely damaged in 2005 by Hurricane Katrina and the associated levee failure floodwaters and was sold to a Dallas businessman. It was then sold to Axiom Global Properties in 2011 (formerly Orpheum Properties, Inc.). Neither of these owners succeeded in restoring the theater to commerce. The theater was purchased in February 2014 by Dr. Eric George, who completed a $13 million renovation. Renovations included installing a new hydraulic floor that can be lifted and lowered to create sloped or flat footing, which allows it to accommodate concerts and events. Additionally, the upgrade included an expanded marble lobby, enlarged seating, additional bathrooms, multiple bars. George and his investment company, ERG Enterprises, completed a subsequent renovation in 2020 by opening a speakeasy bar in the basement of the theater. The venue, called the Double Dealer, opened January 24, 2020.

The theater reopened in August 2015. The first event was held on September 17, 2015, with a performance by the Louisiana Philharmonic Orchestra (LPO). The LPO has since become the anchor tenant for the theater.

== See also ==
- List of concert halls
- List of music venues
- Theatre in Louisiana
