= Henry Braden =

American politician (1944–2013)

Henry English "Hank" Braden, IV

Louisiana State Senator or District 3 (Orleans Parish)
- In office 1978–1984
- Preceded by: Sidney Barthelemy
- Succeeded by: Dennis R. Bagneris

Personal details
- Born: August 24, 1944 New Orleans, Louisiana, USA
- Died: July 15, 2013 (aged 68) New Orleans, Louisiana
- Cause of death: Congestive heart failure
- Party: Democratic
- Spouse: Michele Braden
- Children: Heidi, Remi, Hal, and Nick Braden
- Education: St. Augustine High School Le Moyne College Loyola University New Orleans College of Law
- Occupation: Lawyer; Lobbyist

Henry English "Hank" Braden IV (August 24, 1944 – July 15, 2013) was a lawyer and politician.

Born in New Orleans, Louisiana, Braden received his bachelor's degree from Le Moyne College and his law degree from the Loyola University New Orleans College of Law. He then practiced law and was a lobbyist. Braden was involved with New Orleans Poverty Agency and the New Orleans Urban League as executive director. In 1974–1975, Braden was director for Manpower and Development for the city of New Orleans. Braden then served in the Louisiana Senate as a Democrat 1978–1984. He died in New Orleans, Louisiana.

Louisiana State Senate
Preceded by Sidney Barthelemy	Louisiana State Senator for District 3 (Orleans Parish); Henry English "Hank" Braden, IV; 1978–1984	Succeeded by Dennis R. Bagneris
