= Equitable Building (Atlanta) =

100 Peachtree
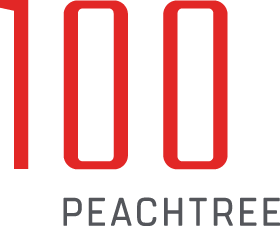

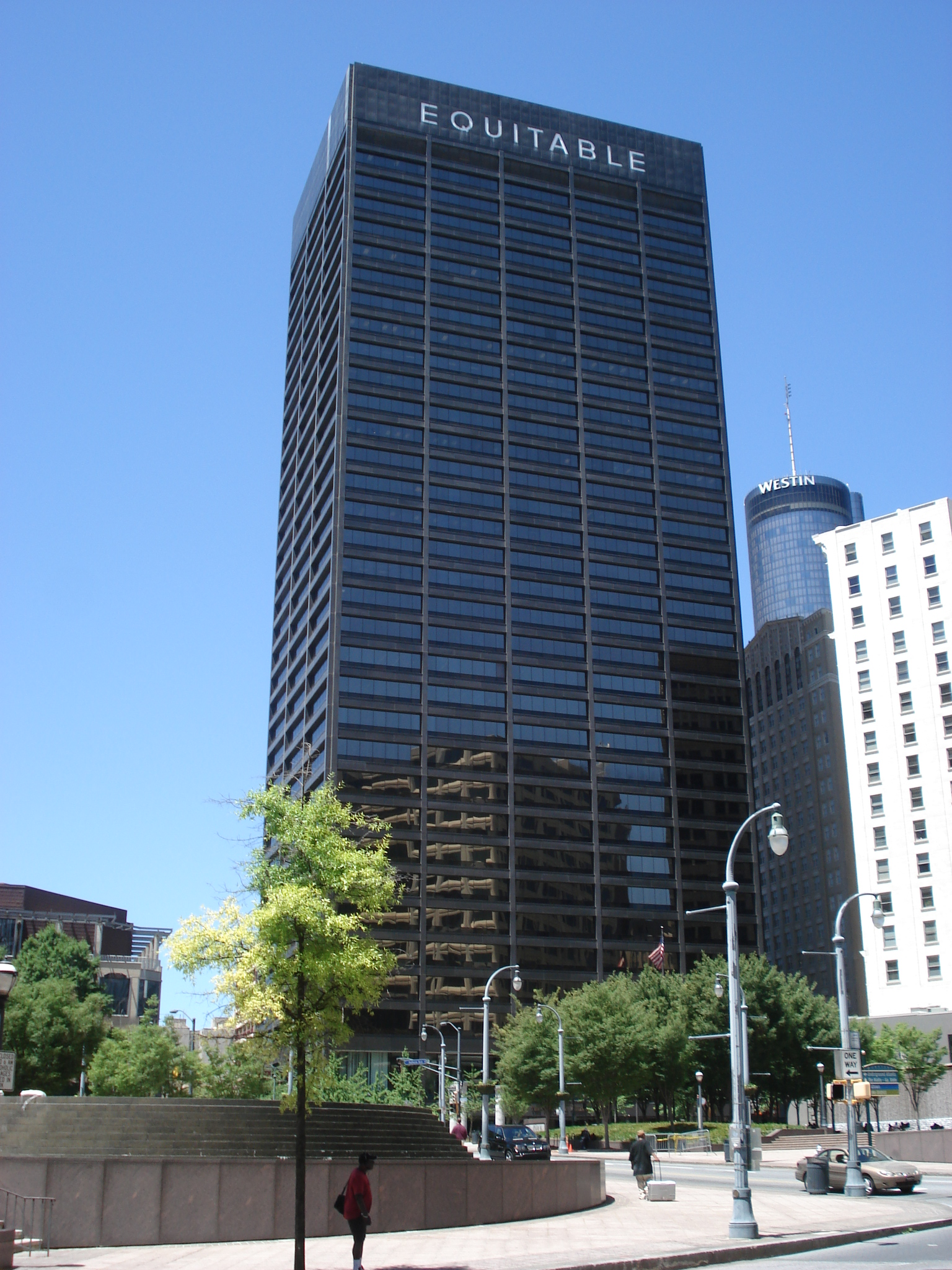
- 100 Peachtree in 2007
- Interactive map of the 100 Peachtree area

General information
- Status: Completed
- Type: Office
- Location: 100 Peachtree Street NW, Atlanta, Georgia, United States
- Coordinates: 33.756774°N 84.388577°W
- Construction started: 1966
- Completed: 1968
- Owner: Capmark Bank (100 Peachtree Street Atlanta LLC)

Height
- Roof: 453 ft (138 m)

Technical details
- Floor count: 32

Design and construction
- Architect: Skidmore, Owings and Merrill

Website
- Official website

The Equitable Life Assurance Building, officially named 100 Peachtree, is a 32-story, 453-foot (138 m) office building in Atlanta, Georgia. It is located at 100 Peachtree Street in the Fairlie-Poplar neighborhood in downtown Atlanta. A typical example of an International-style skyscraper, the building was designed by Chicago-based architectural firm Skidmore, Owings and Merrill, and was constructed in 1968 on the site of the former Piedmont Hotel. The building's "EQUITABLE" signage was an easily recognizable piece of the downtown Atlanta skyline, while the tower's black finish stood in sharp contrast to the surrounding buildings.

The Equitable Building is adjacent to the historic Flatiron Building and the historic Rhodes-Haverty Building. The building's site is bounded on the southwest by Luckie Street, on the northwest by Forsyth Street, on the northeast by Williams Street, and on the southeast by Peachtree Street. The public greenspace and outdoor seating of Woodruff Park is located across Peachtree Street to the south. The building is serviced by MARTA Red and Gold line trains at the Peachtree Center station, as well as the Atlanta Streetcar at the Woodruff Park and Peachtree Center streetcar stops.

In 2017, Georgia's Own Credit Union became the building's main tenant and took naming rights, with the trademark "EQUITABLE" sign replaced with a digital LED display mainly displaying its logo, along with promoting civic and charitable efforts and highlighting the institution's members.

== Ownership ==
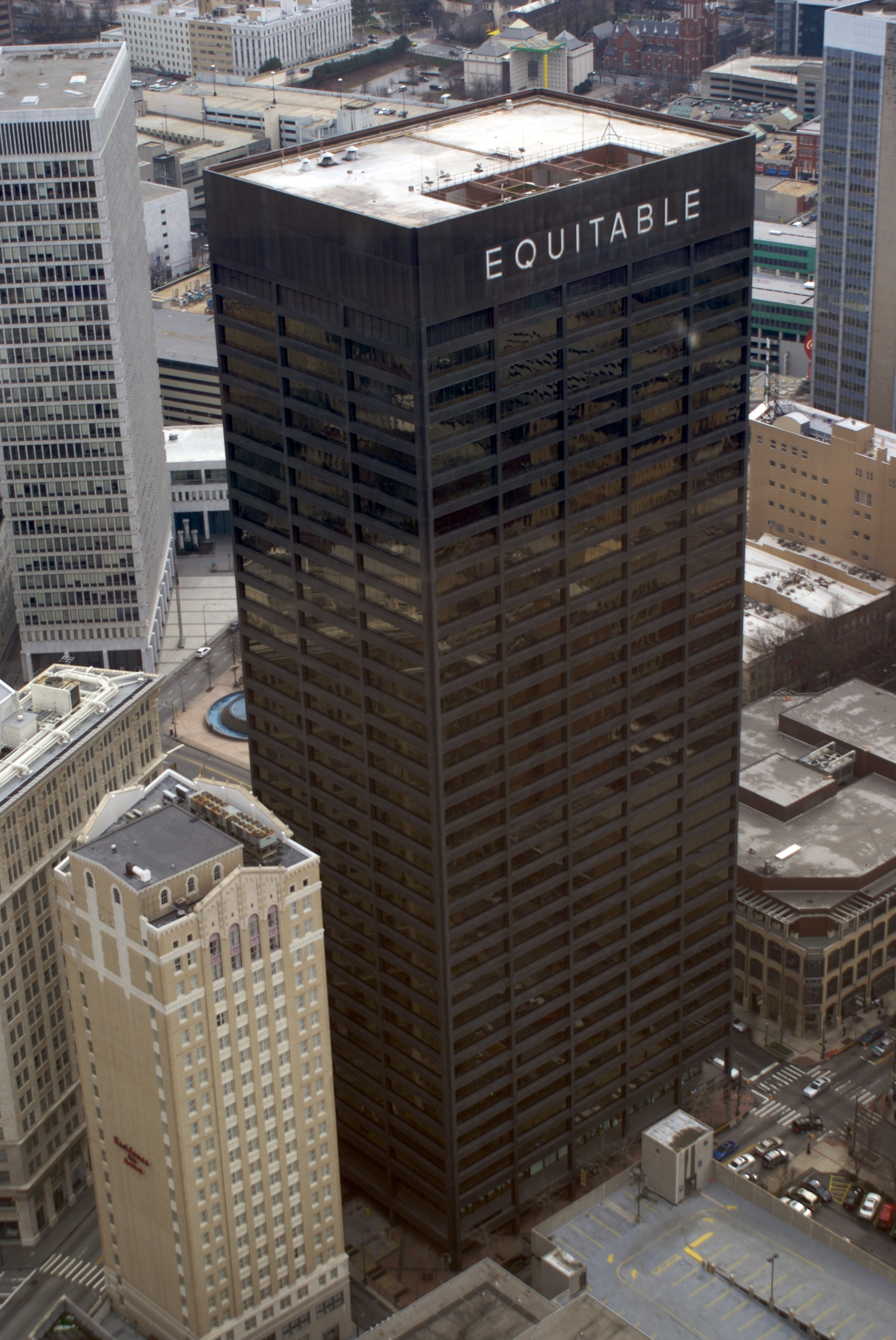
View from the north, with Rhodes-Haverty at lower left

The building was constructed for the Equitable Life Insurance Company in 1968, with the company maintaining ownership of the building from 1968 to 1997 when it was sold to Chicago-based LaSalle Advisors for roughly $36 million. In 2007, it was purchased by Equastone 100 Peachtree LLC for $57 million.

Due to the late-2000s recession, the value of the building dropped by more than 25%, and the building reached a vacancy level of 50%. By April 2009, the building was in foreclosure, and was to be auctioned in May of that year. Equastone owed $52 million to Capmark Bank, and thus was upside-down on its mortgage.

On June 2, 2009 the building was put up for auction in Atlanta. The only bidder, 100 Peachtree Street Atlanta LLC, an affiliate of Capmark Bank, bought the building for $29.5 million. In late January 2010 there were reports that Georgia State University was interested in buying the building and its parking deck and in May 2011 the Atlanta Journal-Constitution reported that GSU was in negotiations to purchase the building to house its J. Mack Robinson College of Business. No deal was ever publicly announced. On July 6, 2011, the building was purchased by Florida-based America's Capital Partners for $19 million.

== Incidents ==
At approximately 11:34pm on March 27, 1968, a fire broke out on the 10th floor of the unfinished Equitable Building and quickly moved upward, destroying much of the unconstructed upper floors that were only steel beams at the time. The fire apparently spread through feeding on the wooden construction material (particularly forms into which concrete flooring would be poured) and high winds. The fire was declared "tapped out" at 6:00am the next morning. According to the Atlanta Fire Department, "debris showered down on adjacent roof tops and apparatus on the street creating a severe hazard for the operating AFD crews," although no one was seriously hurt. Damage totaled $1.6 million.

On March 14, 2008, the Equitable Building sustained minor damage, mainly shattered windows, when a tornado tore through downtown Atlanta. This tornado stands as the only one to have hit the downtown area since the city's founding.

== See also ==
- List of tallest buildings in Atlanta
