= Equastone =

Real estate investment advisor company

Equastone is a real estate investment advisor company, headquartered in San Diego, California.

Equastone owns the following skyscrapers:

- Equitable Building in Atlanta, Georgia
- Pan American Life Center in New Orleans, Louisiana
- One Riverwalk Place in San Antonio, Texas

It also owns several other high-rise and smaller office buildings in Texas, Colorado, Arizona, Nevada, California, and Oregon.

As of April 2009, the Equitable Building is in foreclosure, a month after its River Place Corporate Park office complex in Austin, Texas did the same.
