= Poydras Market =

Coordinates: 29°57′01″N 90°04′27″W

The Poydras Market also known as the Poydras Street Market, was an early market area in New Orleans, Louisiana. It was a public open-air market.

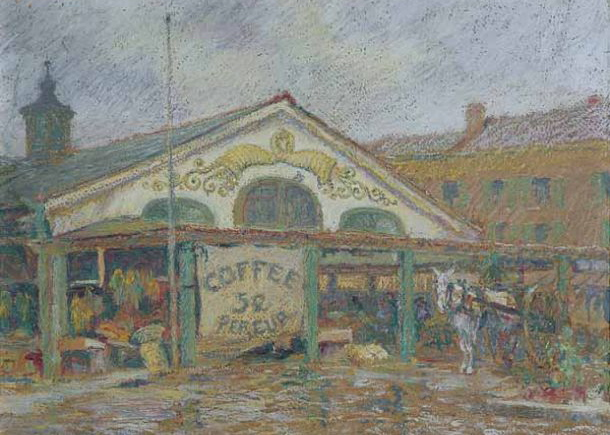
Poydras Market in 1905; painting by William Woodward.

Poydras Market was built in 1837 through a land relinquished by Carrollton Railroad Company in order to sell goods transported by the rail system. It was located on Poydras Street across from Maylie's Restaurant. The area was frequented by prominent families in the area, who kept it quite busy.

On 6 February 1897, twelve of these families submitted a petition to the Public Order Committee to oppose the annexation of Poydras and Lafayette streets into the New Orleans city limits. They argued that the streets were the primary "avenues to the Poydras Market by which all the families residing back of town walk to make their daily market and other purchases." Long argues that they really wanted to keep the market and their neighborhoods segregated from the less respectable denizens of New Orleans proper.

The former Poydras Market area is now part of the New Orleans Central Business District.
