= 1986 New Orleans mayoral election =

- February 1, 1986 (first round); March 1, 1986 (runoff)
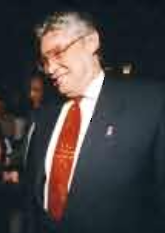

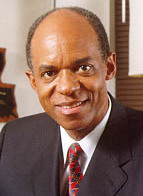

Candidate	Sidney Barthelemy	Bill Jefferson	Sam LeBlanc
Party	Democratic	Democratic
First round	53,961; 33.39%	62,333; 38.57%	40,963; 25.34%
Runoff	93,050; 57.89%	67,680; 42.11%	Eliminated
Mayor before election
Ernest Morial
Democratic
Elected mayor
Sidney Barthelemy
Democratic

The New Orleans mayoral election of 1986 resulted in the election of Democrat Sidney Barthelemy as mayor.

== Background ==
Elections in Louisiana—with the exception of U.S. Presidential and Congressional elections—follow a variation of the open primary system. Candidates of any and all parties are listed on one ballot; voters need not limit themselves to the candidates of one party. Unless one candidate takes more than 50 percent of the vote in the first round, a run-off election is then held between the top two candidates, who may in fact be members of the same party. In this election, the first round of voting was held on February 1, 1986, and the runoff was held on March 1.

== Candidates ==
- Sidney Barthelemy – a city councilor since 1978 (New Orleans's first black councilor-at-large), who had been a fierce rival of outgoing mayor Dutch Morial for nearly a decade. Barthelemy was endorsed by the powerful black political organizations SOUL and COUP. He ran on a promise to "bring this divided city together."
- William J. Jefferson – a Louisiana state Senator and later congressman who had run unsuccessfully against Dutch Morial in the 1982 mayoral race. This time, Jefferson was endorsed by Morial and his LIFE organization, as well as by the city's black Protestant clergy and by the AFL-CIO. He promised a strengthened minority set-aside program, improved public housing, no legalized gambling, and economic development.
- Sam LeBlanc – a lawyer and Louisiana State Representative from 1972 to 1980 and chairman of the Regional Transit Authority under Dutch Morial. A former director of the Chamber of Commerce, LeBlanc ran on a pro-business platform which stressed economic development, rejuvenation of the port, a new city charter, and expansion of the police department and district attorney's office. LeBlanc was the only major white candidate. LeBlanc's campaign was managed by his half brother Rob Couhig, Jr., a Republican lawyer and businessman who went on to contest the New Orleans mayoral race in 2006.
- Rudy Lombard – a businessman and veteran of the civil rights movement who emphasized housing and education issues which were underplayed by the three leading candidates.
- Terry Hardy – an oil refinery worker running as the candidate of the Socialist Workers Party.
- Ben Rauch – president of the Magazine Street Merchants Association

== Campaign ==
The election campaign began in earnest after voters rejected a charter amendment which would have allowed Dutch Morial to run for a third term. This came after a failed attempt in 1983 to remove the two-term limit completely from the charter. The two-term limit was placed in the city charter adopted in 1961.

Early in the primary campaign, polls showed Barthelemy with a 21 point lead over Jefferson, but Jefferson's endorsement by Morial and the support of Morial's political organization LIFE enabled him to take much of Barthelemy's support in the black community. Later, though, Morial's endorsement hurt Jefferson in the runoff as white voters overwhelmingly chose the opponent of 'the Morial candidate.'

Barthelemy spent 1.7 million on the campaign; Jefferson spent 1.3 million.

== Results ==
Primary, February 1

Candidate	Votes received	Percentage of votes cast
William J. Jefferson	62,333	38.57%
Sidney Barthelemy	53,961	33.39%
Sam LeBlanc	40,963	25.34%
Rudy Lombard	3721	2.3%
Terry Hardy	373	0.23%
Ben Rauch	278	0.17%

Jefferson led in most majority black precincts, taking almost 70% of the black vote. Barthelemy won only about 20% of the black vote. While LeBlanc got slightly over half the white votes, Barthelemy also did well in white neighborhoods and so LeBlanc was unable to make the runoff.

Runoff, March 1

Candidate	Votes received	Percentage of votes cast
Sidney Barthelemy	93,050	57.89%
Bill Jefferson	67,680	42.11%

In the runoff, the big question was where Sam LeBlanc's white voters would go. Though LeBlanc didn't make an endorsement, most white voters switched to Barthelemy in the runoff. Barthelemy got 86% of white voters and 30% of black voters; while Jefferson received most black votes and got minimal white support.

== Significance of the election ==
The election was a milestone in many respects. 1986 marked the first time in which the runoff featured two black candidates. It was also the first time that the majority of the voting population (51%) was African-American. The city's white electorate became swing voters; the combination of part of the African-American electorate and white voters won Barthelemy the runoff. Unlike his two immediate predecessors Moon Landrieu and Dutch Morial - who were first elected by a combination of a minority of white voters and an overwhelming proportion of the black electorate - Barthelemy won election against a candidate most blacks preferred by appealing to the vast majority of white voters, a strategy which was successfully duplicated by Ray Nagin against Richard Pennington in the 2002 election.

== Sources ==
- The New Orleans Times Picayune. February 2–3, March 2–3, 1986.
- Board of Supervisors of Elections for the Parish of Orleans. Election Returns of Orleans Parish, 1986.
- Haas, Edward F. "Political Continuity in the Crescent City: Toward an Interpretation of New Orleans Politics, 1874-1986." Louisiana History 1998, 39:1.
- Hirsch, Arnold. "Simply a Matter of Black and White: The Transformation of Race and Politics in Twentieth-Century New Orleans." Found in Arnold Hirsch and Joseph Logsdon's Creole New Orleans: Race and Americanization. LSU Press, 1992.

Preceded by 1982 mayoral election	New Orleans mayoral elections	Succeeded by 1990 mayoral election
