= 1990 New Orleans mayoral election =

- February 3, 1990
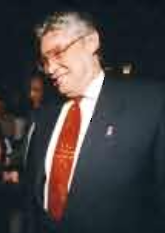

Candidate	Sidney Barthelemy	Donald Mintz
Party	Democratic	Democratic
Popular vote	79,995	65,047
Percentage	54.57%	44.38%
Mayor before election
Sidney Barthelemy
Democratic
Elected mayor
Sidney Barthelemy
Democratic

The New Orleans mayoral election of 1990 resulted in the reelection of Sidney Barthelemy to a second term as mayor of New Orleans.

== Background ==
Elections in Louisiana—with the exception of U.S. presidential and Congressional elections—follow a variation of the open primary system. Candidates of any and all parties are listed on one ballot; voters need not limit themselves to the candidates of one party. Unless one candidate takes more than 50% of the vote in the first round, a run-off election is then held between the top two candidates, who may in fact be members of the same party. In this election, Barthelemy won 55% of the vote in the first round of voting held on February 3, 1990, so no runoff round was needed.

== Candidates ==
- incumbent mayor Sidney Barthelemy
- Donald Mintz, a lawyer and member of the Board of Commissioners of the Port of New Orleans.
- Herman Bustamante, the owner of a ship supply company
- Rudy Mills Sr.

== Campaign ==
Sidney Barthelemy began the campaign under a cloud of declining popularity and questions surrounding his leadership. He campaigned on his record, citing his role in spurring the beginnings of an economic recovery for New Orleans. Mintz felt that Barthelemy was vulnerable enough on the issue of leadership in a city burdened by high unemployment and crime that black voters would be willing to choose a white challenger over a black incumbent. His campaign portrayed Barthelemy as an inattentive mayor better at distributing patronage than generating income. A close friend of former mayor Dutch Morial, Mintz expected to receive Morial's endorsement against Barthelemy, the former mayor's long-time political opponent. Morial's endorsement would likely have helped Mintz's support among black voters, but Morial died unexpectedly on Christmas Eve 1989, six weeks before the election, before endorsing either candidate. Barthelemy, who received most of his support from white voters in the 1986 election, began stressing his record of achievements for the black community in order to compensate for the number of white supporters he expected to lose to Mintz. His campaign featured slogans like "I'm not ready to lose the gains we've made."

The election results showed votes were largely cast along racial lines. Barthelemy's victory was assured by a combination of his overwhelming 86% support of black voters (who formed 54% of the electorate) and a significant number (23%) of white voters who supported him over Mintz. Mintz was able to garner strong support among white voters who had helped elect Barthelemy in 1986, but was not able to convince enough black voters to reject Barthelemy and elect a white candidate instead. He received only 14% support among black voters; not enough to unseat the incumbent.

== Results ==
Candidate	Votes received	Percentage of votes cast
Sidney Barthelemy (incumbent)	79,995	54.57%
Donald Mintz	65,047	44.38%
Herman Bustamante	803	0.55%
Rudy Mills Sr.	734	0.5%

== Sources ==
- The New Orleans Times-Picayune "Barthelemy wins re-election: Mayor beats Mintz with 55% of the vote." February 4, 1990.
- The New Orleans Times-Picayune "Challenger couldn't shake mayor's black support." February 4, 1990.
- The New Orleans Times-Picayune Timing turns bad for Mintz at race's end." February 5, 1990.

Preceded by 1986 mayoral election	New Orleans mayoral elections	Succeeded by 1994 mayoral election
