= New Orleans Upper Central Business District =

- Upper Central Business District
- U.S. National Register of Historic Places
- U.S. Historic district
- Location within Louisiana Location within the United States

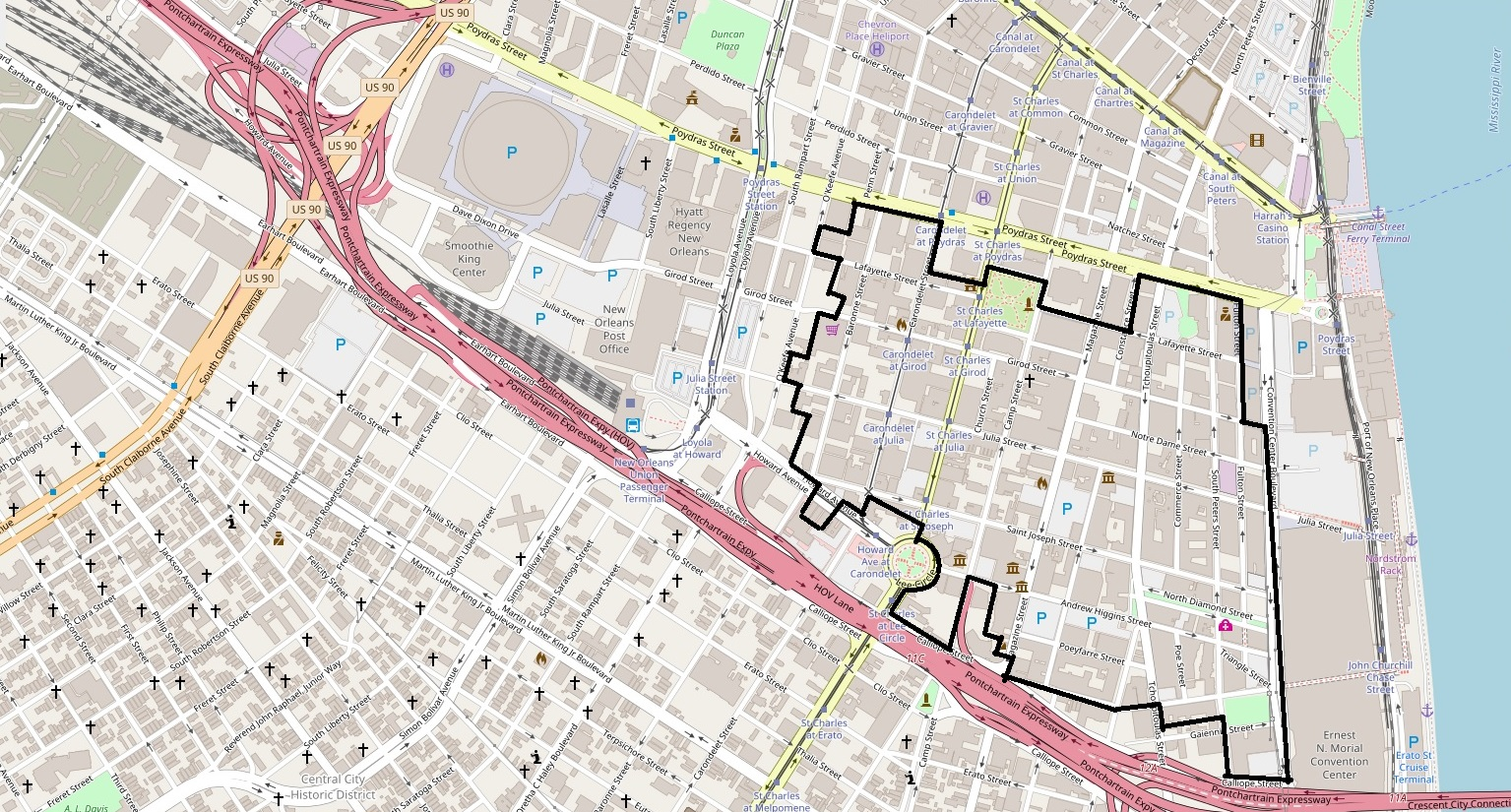
- Location: Roughly bounded by O'Keefe, Poydras, Convention Center Blvd., and the Expressway (B.R. 90), New Orleans, Louisiana
- Area: 179 acres (72 ha)
- Architectural style: Early Commercial, Greek Revival, Italianate
- NRHP reference No.: 90001231 (original); 93000831 (increase 1); 08000755 (increase 2)

Significant dates
- Added to NRHP: August 10, 1990
- Boundary increases: August 12, 1993; August 6, 2008

The New Orleans Upper Central Business District, also known simply as Upper Central Business District, is a historic district of New Orleans, Louisiana which was listed on the National Register of Historic Places (NRHP) in 1990. The original listed area is roughly bounded by O'Keefe, Poydras, Convention Center Blvd., and the Expressway (B.R. 90). Along with the NRHP-listed New Orleans Lower Central Business District to the north, across the redeveloped Poydras Street, it is included within the larger New Orleans Central Business District area.

The original area listed in 1990 included more than 400 contributing buildings and one contributing site on 179 acres (72 ha). This area combined two previously certified areas, the Warehouse District and the Lafayette Square District.

21 resources in the district were already separately listed on the National Register. These included:

- Julia Street Row, 13 buildings constructed in 1832, NRHP-listed in 1977.
- Leeds Iron Foundry (1852), at 923 Tchoupitoulas St.
- Gallier Hall (1845), at 545 St. Charles Ave., also known as New Orleans City Hall
- St. Patrick's Church (1837), at 724 Camp St.
- Federal Fibre Mills Building (1904), at 1101 S. Peters St.

A boundary increase in 1993 added 23 contributing buildings and six non-contributing ones on 17 acres (6.9 ha).

A second boundary increase in 2008 added two more contributing buildings on less than one acre. The twice-amended district includes 437 contributing buildings and 70 non-contributing ones, one contributing site and one non-contributing one, and three non-contributing structures.
