= Le Pavillon Hotel =

- The Neoclassical facade of the Le Pavillon on Poydras Street

- Location within Louisiana

General information
- Location: 833 Poydras Street, New Orleans, Louisiana
- Coordinates: 29.9504°N 90.0728°W
- Opening: 1907

Other information
- Number of rooms: 219
- Number of suites: 7
- Number of restaurants: 1 The Crystal Room.
- Parking: On site

Website
- http://www.lepavillon.com
- Members of Leading Hotels of the World.

The Le Pavillon Hotel is a historic hotel in New Orleans, Louisiana.

== History ==
The hotel opened in 1907 as the New Denechaud Hotel. It was renamed the DeSoto Hotel in 1913 and then the Le Pavillon Hotel in 1971.

Le Pavillon Hotel was placed on the National Register of Historic Places by the U.S. Department of the Interior in 1991. Le Pavillon Hotel is a member of Historic Hotels of America, the official program of the National Trust for Historic Preservation.
