= Poydras Street =

Street in New Orleans, Louisiana, U.S.

- Rue Poydras
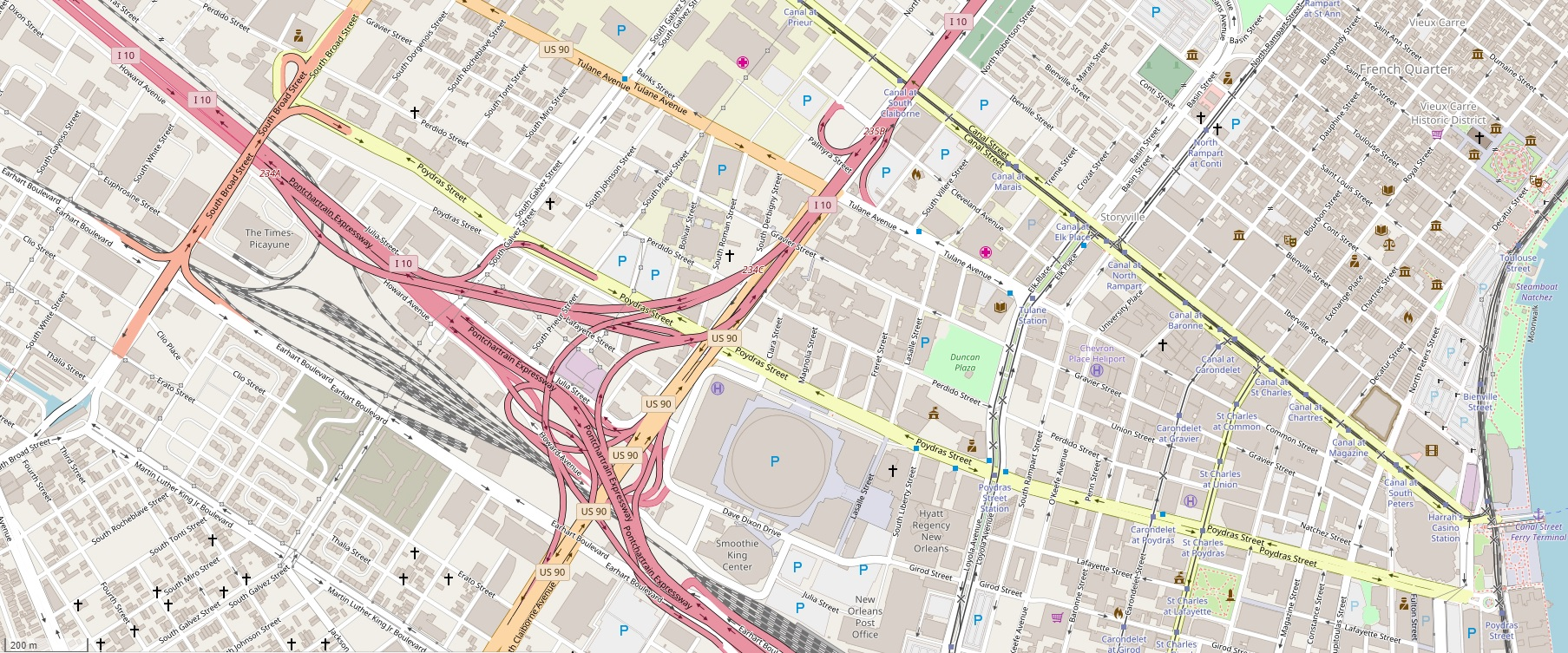
- Poydras Street (yellow) shown running west northwest from the Mississippi River
- Namesake: Julien de Lallande Poydras
- Length: 1.9 mi (3.1 km)
- Width: 132 feet (40.2 m)
- Location: New Orleans
- West end: Broad Street
- East end: Convention Center Boulevard

Other
- Known for: Tall buildings

Poydras Street (French: Rue Poydras) is a street that serves as the main artery of the New Orleans Central Business District, in New Orleans, Louisiana. The street is named for Julien de Lallande Poydras. Many of the city of New Orleans' and the state of Louisiana's tallest buildings have been built on the street since it was widened in the mid 1960s. The street also hosts several historic structures and is the boundary between two United States National Register of Historic Places districts.

== History ==
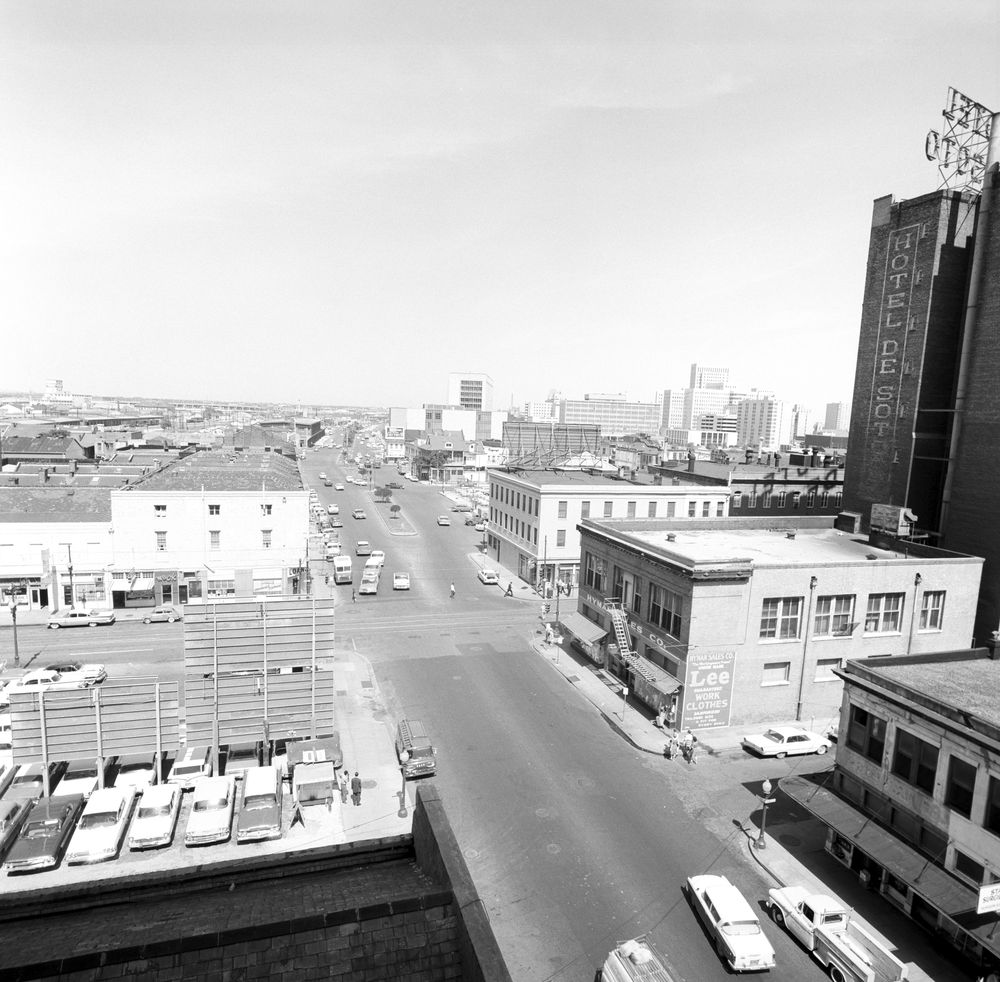
Poydras Street in 1962 before it was widened and before De Soto (Le Pavillon) Hotel renovation

The street is named for Julien de Lallande Poydras, who helped Louisiana achieve statehood, served as the first President of the Louisiana State Senate, and Delegate from the Territory of Orleans to the United States House of Representatives, Eleventh Congress (March 4, 1809 — March 3, 1811).

The street traces back to 1788 when it was first laid out, but its prominence traces back to its transformation that began in the 1960s. In the 1890s, Poydras Street and Canal Street were early hosts of municipal lighting when gigantic spotlights in steel light towers were erected upon them by Muller Co. In 1927, when its width measured 74 feet (22.6 m), the movement to widen it was begun by consultants for the City Planning Commission. The street hosted the Poydras Market from 1838 to 1932. As urban planning evolved, Poydras became the logical 4-lane connection between Expressways. It took until 1964 for a bond issue to pass that would acquire the properties to widen the street as had been recommended in 1927. From November 23, 1964 until August 16, 1966, demolition, drainage installation, utility connection, paving, sidewalk construction and landscaping occurred, resulting in a six-lane 132-foot (40.2 m) wide street. Many factors combined to give Poydras Street its prominent place in urban transit, including the erection of the Louisiana Superdome at one end and the Rivergate Exhibition Hall at the Mississippi River end in the late 1960s and the construction of One Shell Square in 1972. Subsequently, more than a dozen skyscrapers were erected along the street that has become a central area circulator for vehicular traffic and host of modern high-rise construction.

The street currently accommodates a Spaghetti Junction near the Superdome that provides access to U.S. Route 90, Interstate 10 and U.S. Route 90 Business. The Street hosts various stops for the New Orleans Regional Transit Authority streetcar lines: Riverfront, Rampart–Loyola and St. Charles. According to the Port of New Orleans, the Canal and Poydras Street Wharves hosts a 300 feet (91.4 m) long and 15 feet (4.6 m) deep berth used for river boat harbor excursion tours.

== Notable buildings ==
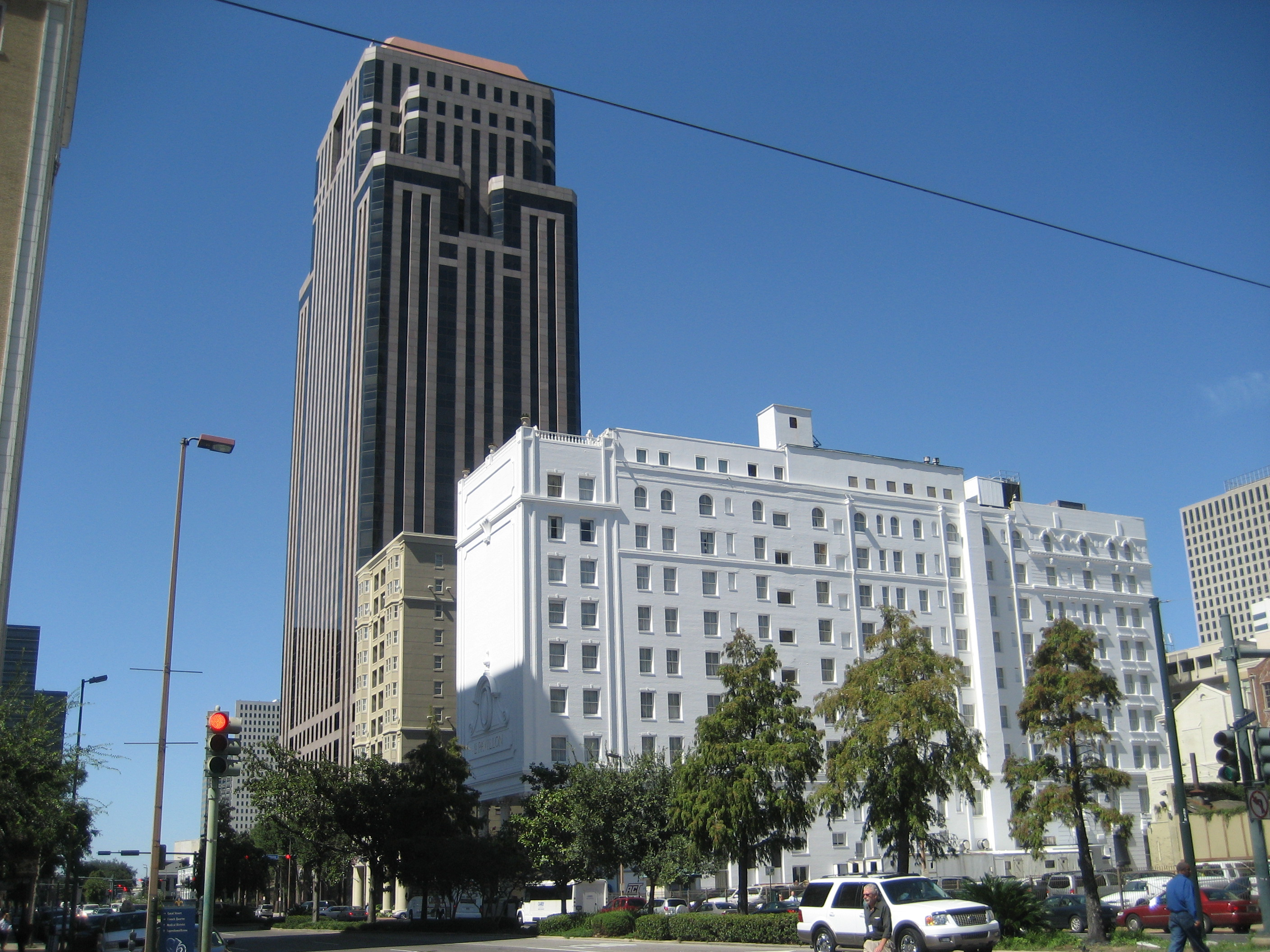
Le Pavillon Hotel in the foreground and the First Bank and Trust Tower in the background along Poydras Street

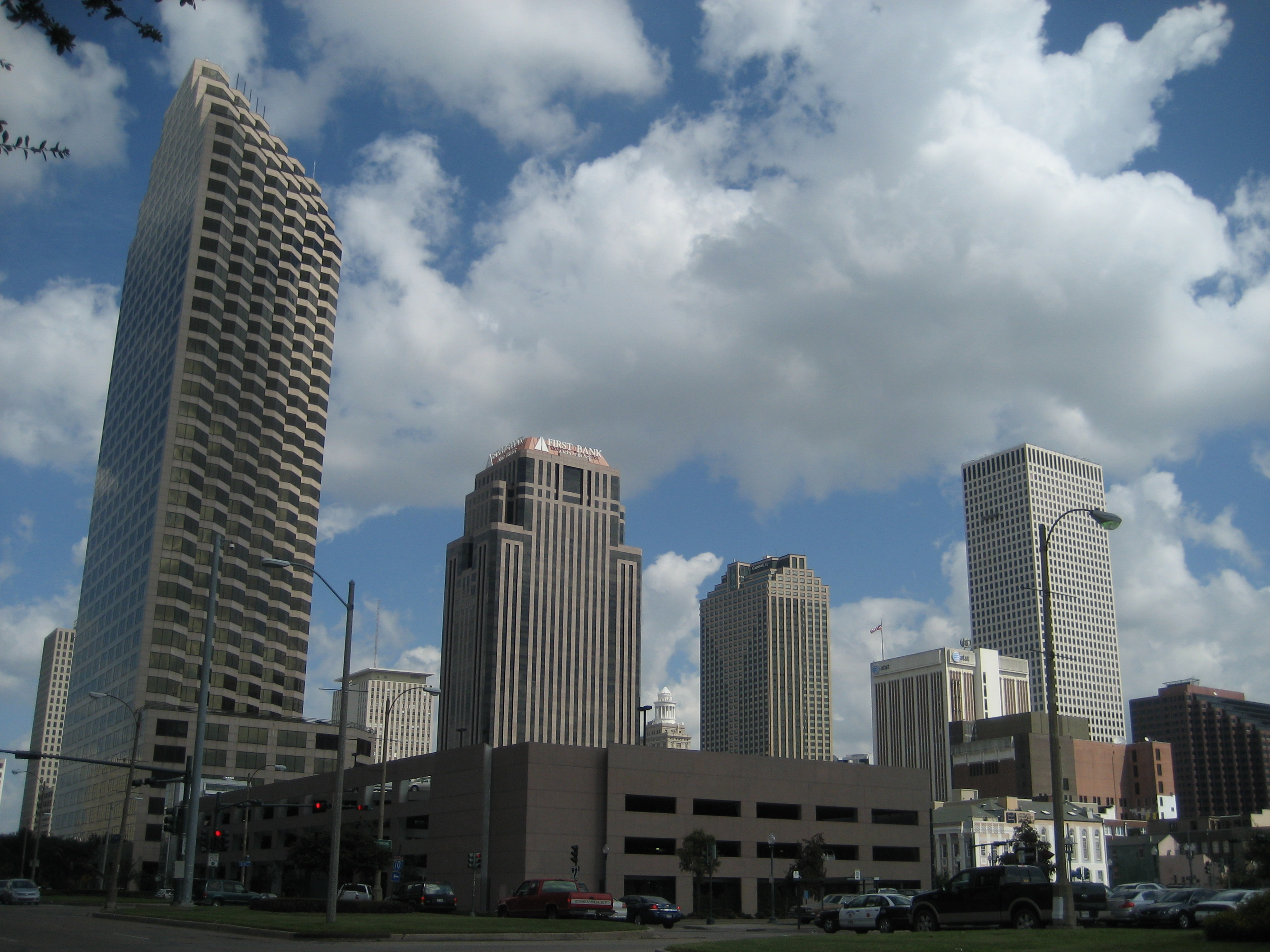
Poydras Street features (left to right) Energy Centre (1100 Poydras), First Bank and Trust Tower (909 Poydras), One Shell Square (701 Poydras), and Pan American Life Center (601 Poydras)

=== Height ===
Below are buildings with Poydras Street addresses that are notable based on their height (listed by height).

- One Shell Square 701 Poydras Street (The tallest building in the state of Louisiana)
- Energy Centre 1100 Poydras Street
- First Bank and Trust Tower 909 Poydras Street
- 400 Poydras Tower
- Benson Tower 1450 Poydras Street
- 1250 Poydras Plaza
- Hilton New Orleans Riverside 2 Poydras Street
- 1515 Poydras
- Pan American Life Center 601 Poydras Street
- Poydras Center 650 Poydras Street
- Orleans Tower 1340 Poydras Street
- Le Méridien New Orleans 333 Poydras Street
- Freeport McMoRan Building 1615 Poydras Street
- 930 Poydras
- 1555 Poydras

=== Historic ===
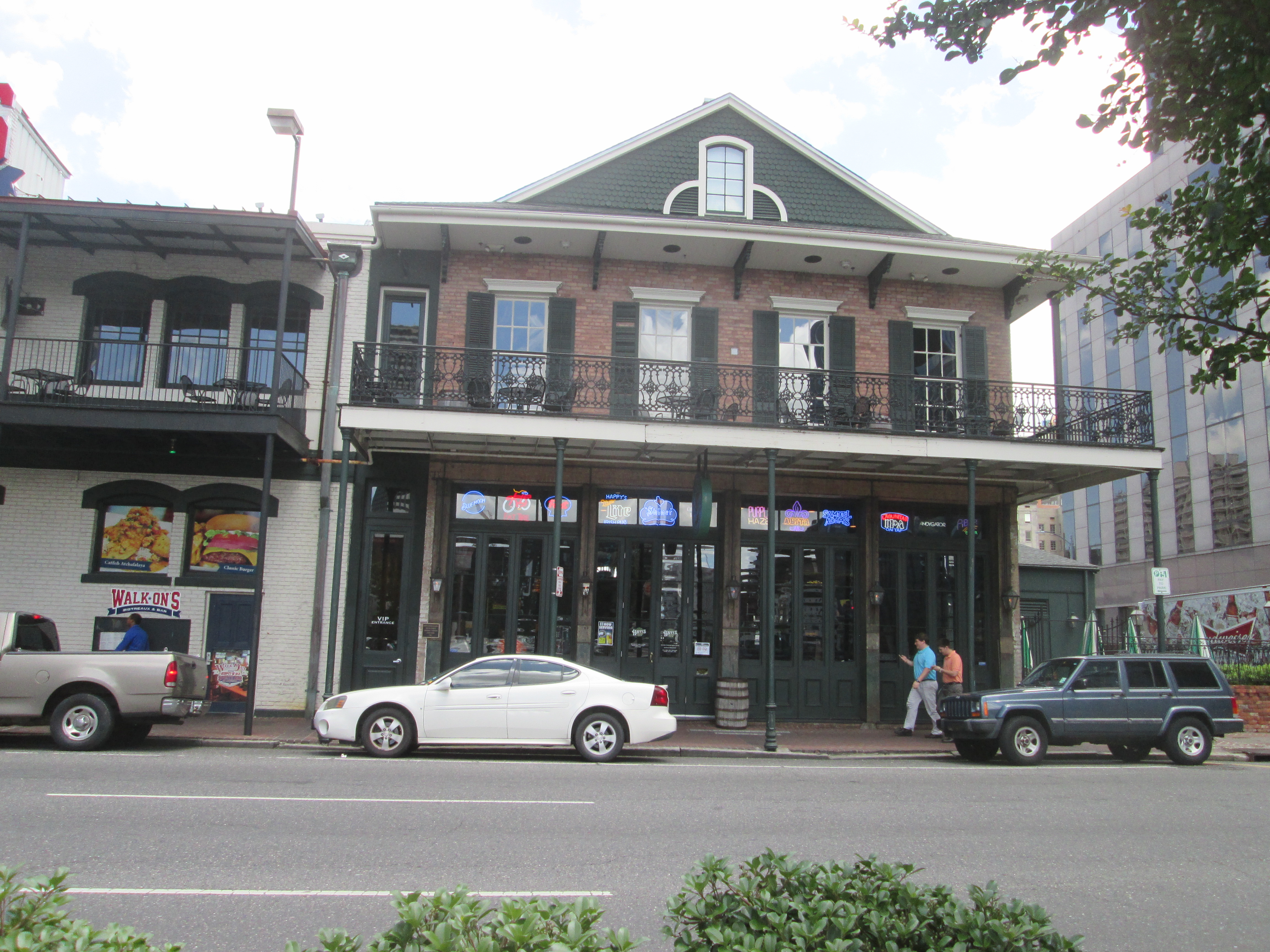
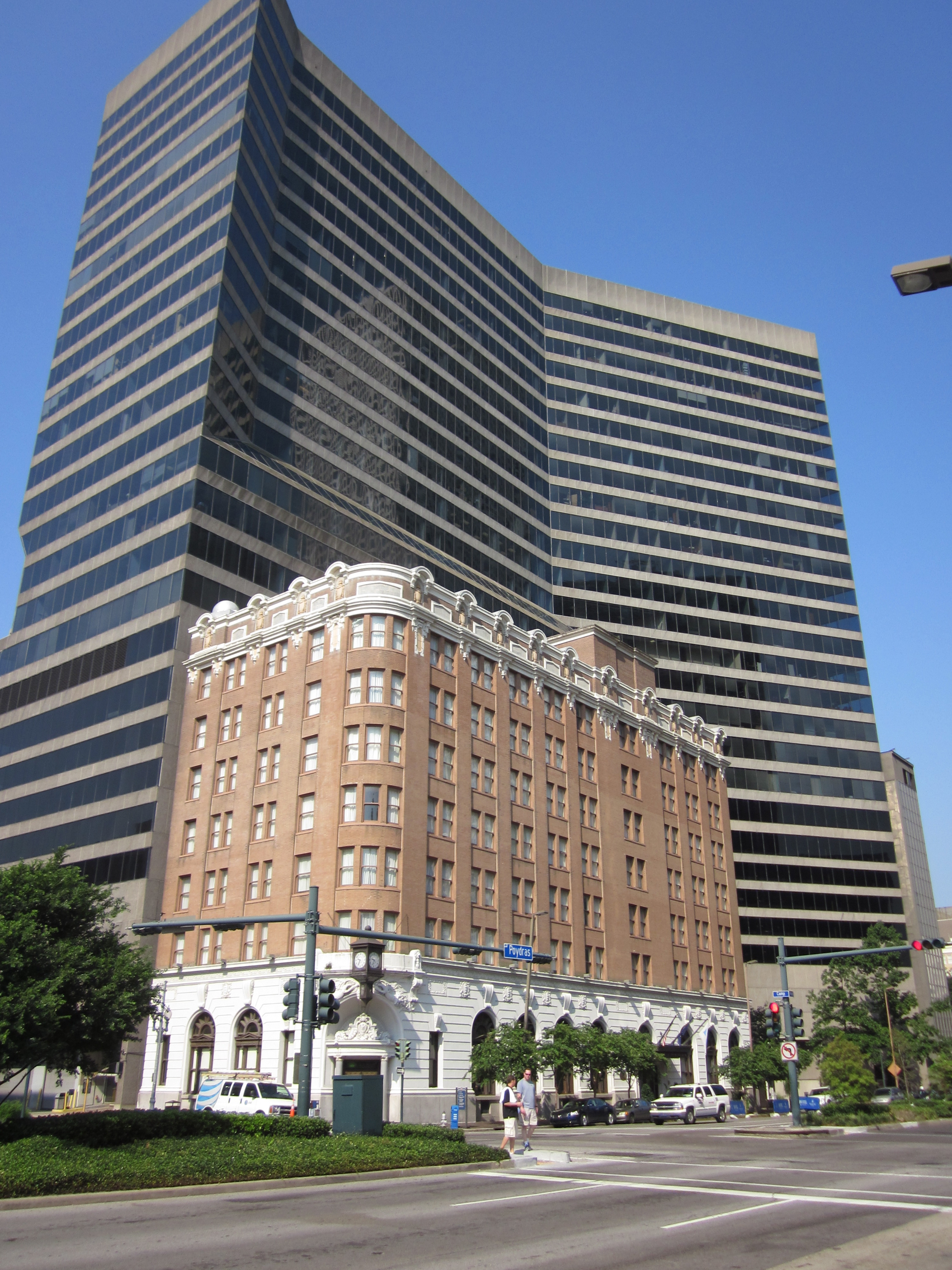
Maylie's Restaurant (left) and Whitney National Bank (Poydras Branch, right, in front of Poydras Center) are among the National Register of Historic Places listings in Orleans Parish, Louisiana.

The buildings and districts below are recognized as historic by the National Park Service.

- Maylie's Restaurant
- Whitney National Bank (Poydras Branch)
- New Orleans Lower Central Business District

- The northern side of Poydras Street between Baronne (Le Pavillon Hotel is at 833 Poydras Street on the corner of Baronne) and Carondelet Streets and between Camp and Tchoupitoulas Streets serves as the boundary of the original the district.

- New Orleans Upper Central Business District

- The southern side of Poydras Street between Constance Street and Convention Center Boulevard serves as the boundary of the original portion of the district that subsumed the previously certified Warehouse District.
- The following addresses on Poydras Street were added as contributing properties for the first boundary increase: 820 Poydras, 900 Poydras, 902 Poydras, 906–08 Poydras and 918–20 Poydras.

=== Other ===
- Caesars Superdome
- Creole Queen

== See also ==
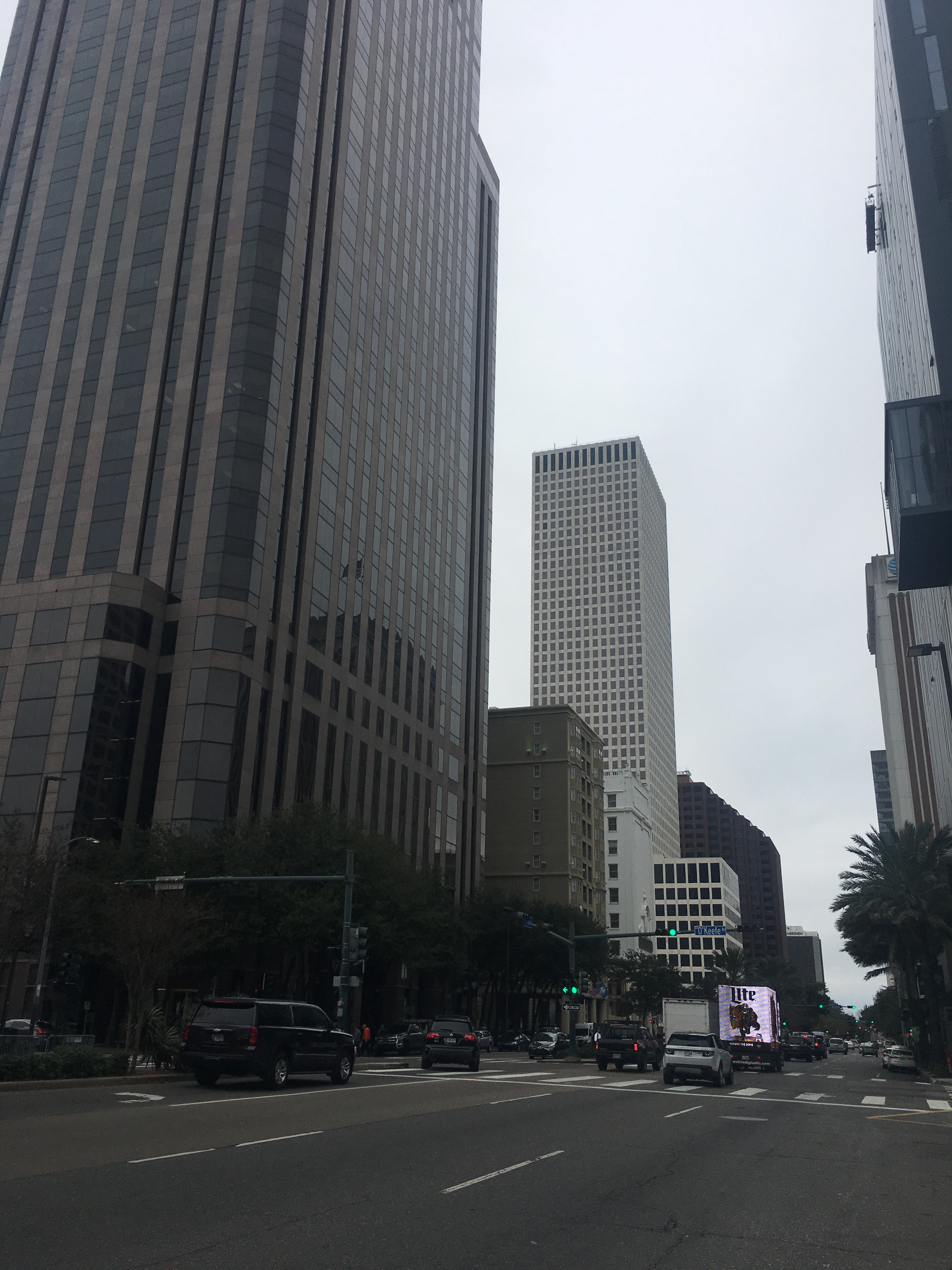
Poydras Street is now a wide thoroughfare

- New Orleans Central Business District
- List of streets of New Orleans
- Poydras Market
