= Creole Queen =

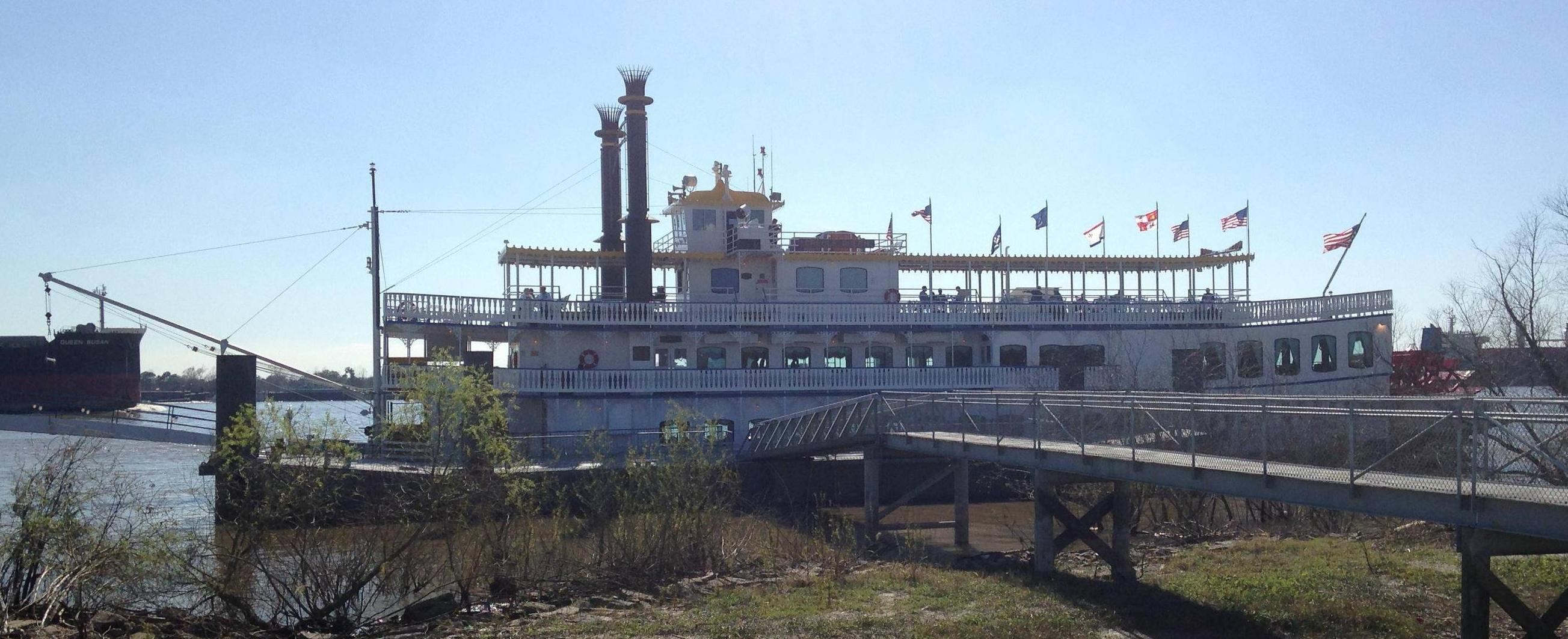
- The Creole Queen docked at the Chalmette Battlefield and National Cemetery, March 5, 2016

Creole Queen is a 1,000-passenger paddlewheel riverboat operating out of the Port of New Orleans. She is operated by New Orleans Paddlewheels, Inc. She was built by Halter Marine at Moss Point, Mississippi along the lines of a turn-of-the-century sternwheeler and was christened into service in September 1983. She is 190 feet (58 m) long and 40 feet (12 m) wide. She has three decks, two of which house three dining and banquet rooms and a third top deck for covered outside seating. Her gross tonnage is 397. She is docked at the Poydras Street dock adjacent to the Riverwalk and New Orleans Hilton Riverside and Towers. Her master is Captain Brian Clesi.
