= Pan American Life Center =

High rise building in New Orleans

Pan-American Life Building
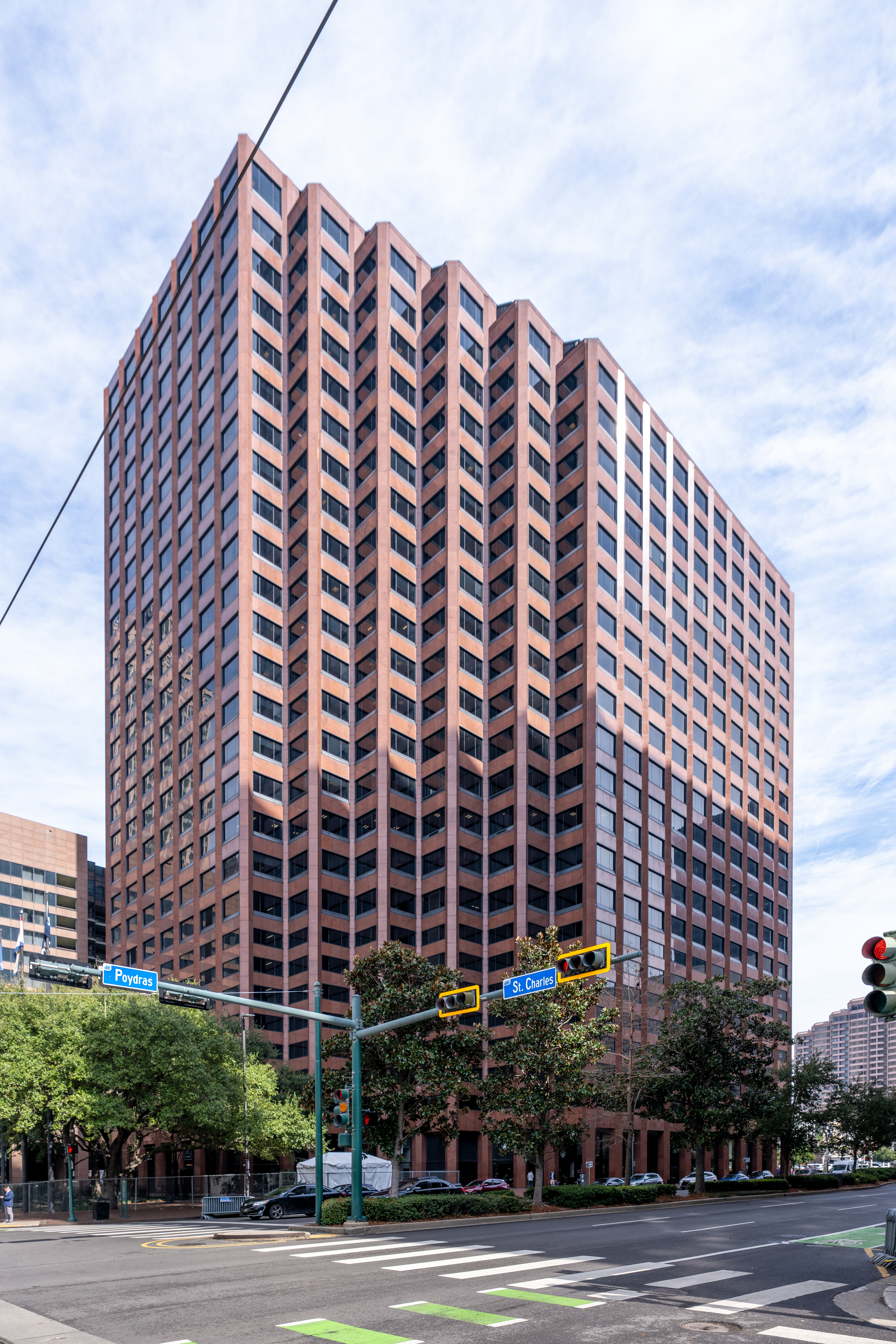
- Interactive map of the Pan-American Life Building area

General information
- Type: Office
- Location: New Orleans, United States
- Coordinates: 29.95°N 90.0694°W
- Completed: 1980

Height
- Antenna spire: N/A
- Roof: 322 feet (98 m)
- Top floor: 322 feet (98 m)

Technical details
- Floor count: 28
- Floor area: 675,000 sq ft (62,700 m^{2})

Design and construction
- Architect: Skidmore, Owings & Merrill

The Pan-American Life Building, located at 601 Poydras Street in the Central Business District of New Orleans, Louisiana, is a 28-story, 322 feet (98 m)-tall high-rise building. Designed by Skidmore, Owings & Merrill, it was built in 1980 as the headquarters for the Pan-American Life Insurance Co.

In December 2006, Pan-American sold the building to Equastone, a California real estate company. The Hotel Intercontinental, which adjoins the Pan-American Life Center and is owned by the insurance company, was not included in the sale to Equastone.

In December 2010, Stirling 601 Poydras, LLC, an entity composed of local investors led by Stirling Properties, acquired the Pan-American Life Center in New Orleans, Louisiana from Equastone Real Estate Investment Advisors, a private real estate investment firm in San Diego, California.

== Location ==
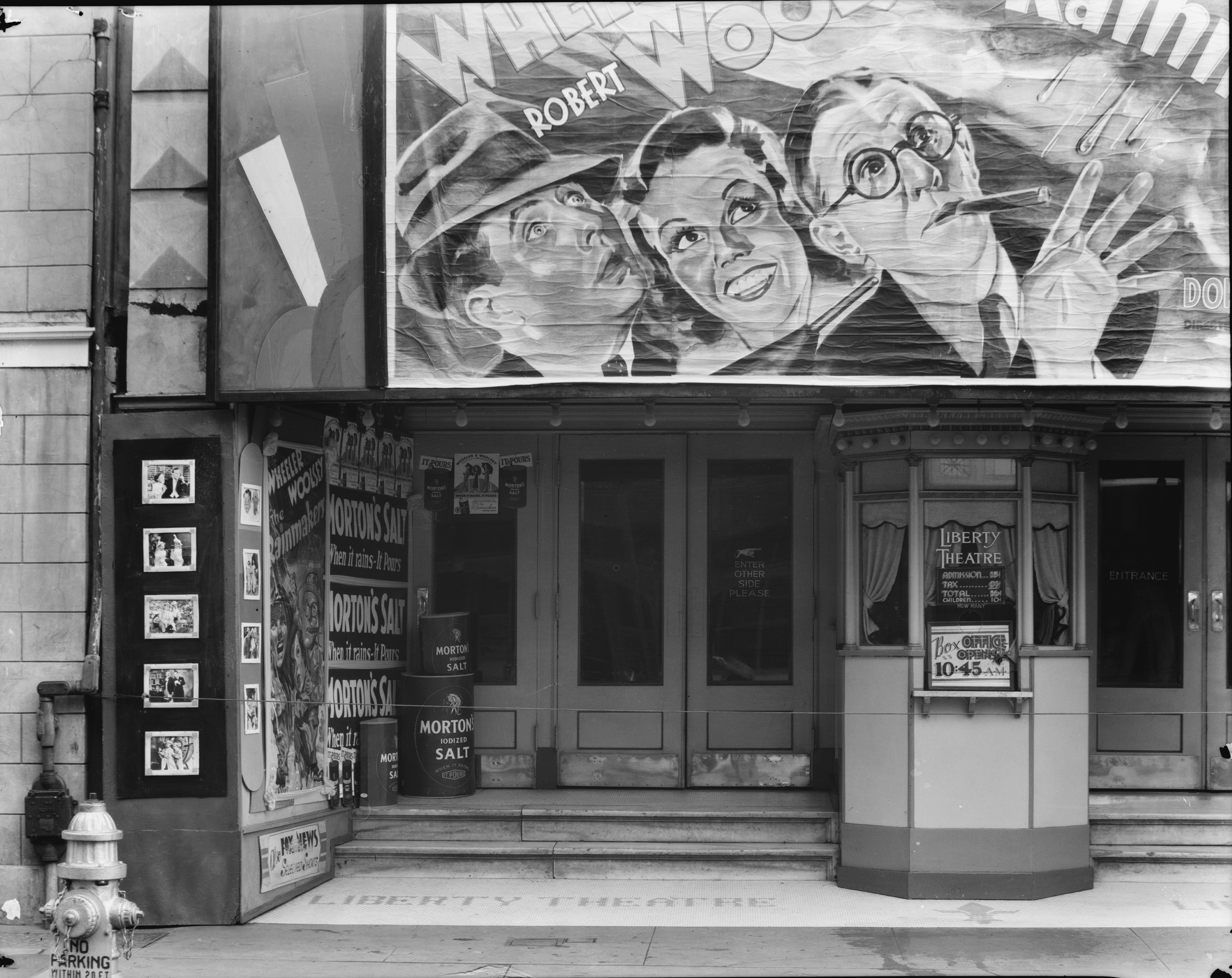
Liberty Theatre, one of the buildings formerly located on the site.

Pan-American Life Building is bounded by the following streets:

- Poydras Street (north)
- Gravier Street (south)
- St. Charles Avenue (east)
- Camp Street (west)

== See also ==
- List of tallest buildings in New Orleans
