= First Bank and Trust Tower =

BankPlus Tower
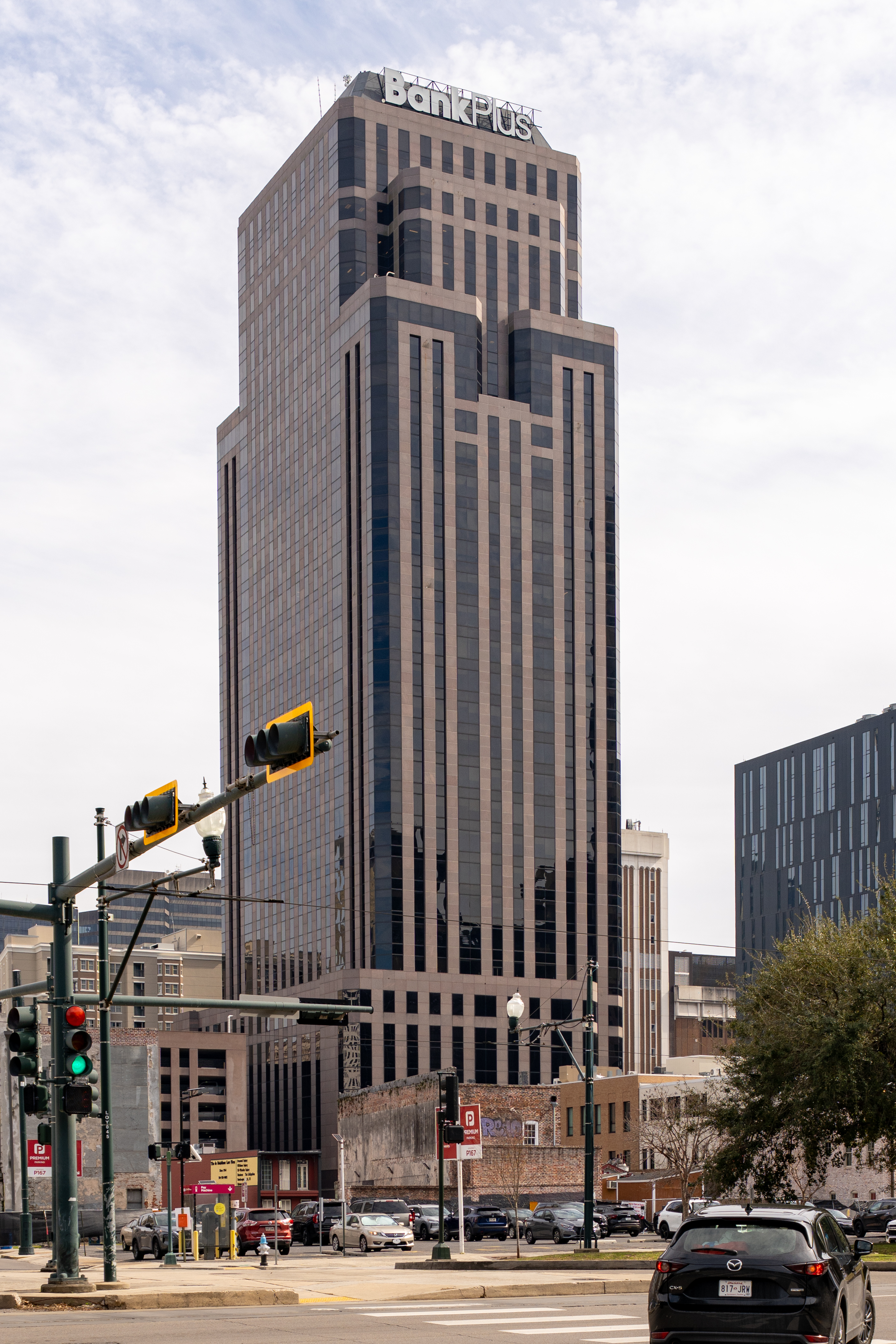
- BankPlus Tower seen from Loyola Avenue at Poydras (2026)
- Interactive map of the BankPlus Tower area

General information
- Type: Office, Retail
- Location: New Orleans, United States
- Coordinates: 29°57′02″N 90°04′26″W
- Completed: 1987

Height
- Antenna spire: N/A
- Roof: 481 feet (147 m)

Technical details
- Floor count: 36
- Floor area: Office: 544,998 square feet (50,632 m^{2})
- Lifts/elevators: 15

Design and construction
- Architect: Welton Becket & Associates

The BankPlus Tower (previously known as the First Bank and Trust Tower, LL&E Tower and 909 Poydras Tower), located at 909 Poydras Street in the Central Business District of New Orleans, Louisiana, is a 36-story, 481 feet (147 m)-tall skyscraper designed in the post-modern style by Welton Becket & Associates and developed by Joseph C. Canizaro. It is the fifth tallest building in both the city of New Orleans and the state of Louisiana. Floors 2-8 are parking levels, and 10-36 hold office space. Hertz Investment Group is the current owner, having acquired the building in 2005. Beau Box Commercial Real Estate handles the leasing for this building. The current name comes from the New Orleans area bank BankPlus, the previous name comes from the Louisiana Land & Exploration Company.

The exterior of the building is clad in granite and bronze tinted glass. The building is illuminated by spotlights at night, making it one of the most visible buildings in New Orleans' night time skyline. The 7 levels of parking are accessed from O'Keefe Avenue. In front of the main entrance on Poydras Street are a pair of bronze sculptures by Enrique Alférez depicting David and a lute player.

The building suffered some damage during Hurricane Katrina in August 2005, including blown out windows and roof damage. The building reopened to tenants in late 2005.

== Location ==
909 Poydras Street
New Orleans, LA 70112–4000

The BankPlus Tower is bounded by the following streets:

- Poydras Street (south)
- O'Keefe Avenue (west)
- Perdido Street (north)
- Penn Street (east)

== See also ==
- List of tallest buildings in New Orleans
- List of tallest buildings in Louisiana
