= Entergy New Orleans =

Electric power utility in New Orleans, Louisiana, United States

- Formerly: New Orleans Public Service Incorporated
- Type: Subsidiary
- Industry: Electricity
- Founded: Early 1900s
- Headquarters: 639 Loyola Avenue, New Orleans, Louisiana
- Area served: Orleans Parish, Louisiana
- Production output: 1,260 megawatts (2025)
- Number of employees: 4,700 (2022)
- Website: https://www.entergyneworleans.com/

Entergy New Orleans, a subsidiary of Entergy, is an electric utility based in New Orleans, Louisiana. It was a mass transit and gas provider under its former name, New Orleans Public Service Incorporated (NOPSI).

== History ==
The various streetcar lines of New Orleans were consolidated under NOPSI's control in 1922. Throughout the 1950s and 1960s, NOPSI converted all the original streetcar lines in New Orleans, except for the St. Charles Streetcar Line, to bus service.

It was headquartered in a building built in 1927, which later became the NOPSI New Orleans hotel.

In 1983, control of the system's mass transit was transferred to a public agency, the New Orleans Regional Transit Authority. NOPSI became Entergy New Orleans, a subsidiary of Entergy, in April 1996. On July 1, 2025, Entergy New Orleans sold its natural gas distribution system to Delta Utilities.

== Facilities ==
- New Orleans Power Station
