= Hancock Whitney =

American bank holding company

Hancock Whitney Corp.
- Type: Public
- Traded as: Nasdaq: HWC; S&P 400 component
- Industry: Banking
- Founded: 1899; 127 years ago
- Headquarters: Gulfport, Mississippi, U.S.
- Key people: John M. Hairston (president & CEO); Michael M. Achary (CFO)
- Revenue: ▲$1.515 billion (2025)
- Net income: ▲$0.486 billion (2025)
- Total assets: ▲$35.473 billion (2025)
- Number of employees: 3,627 (2025)
- Website: hancockwhitney.com

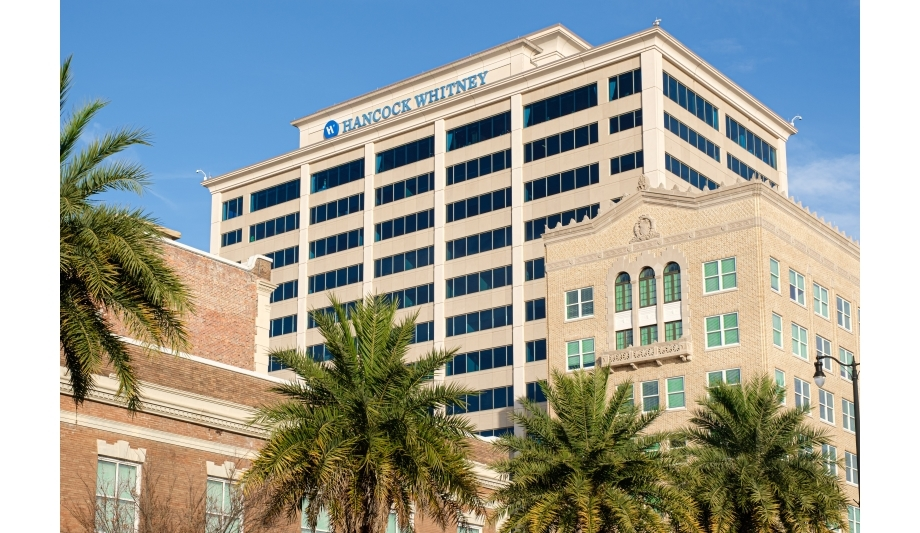
Headquarters of Hancock-Whitney Bank in downtown Gulfport, Mississippi

Hancock Whitney Corp. is an American bank holding company headquartered in Gulfport, Mississippi. As of December 31, 2025, it operated 180 banking locations in Mississippi, Louisiana, Alabama, Florida and Texas and in the Nashville and Atlanta metropolitan areas. The bank is the official bank of the New Orleans Saints and issues the official debit card. The bank is also the official bank of LSU Athletics and the Louisiana Ragin' Cajuns, being the exclusive provider of credit cards for the LSU Tigers, as well as debit cards for both athletic brands.

== History ==
Hancock County Bank was founded in 1899 in Bay Saint Louis, Mississippi by 19 individuals. On its first day, the bank opened with $10,000 in capital and $8,277.41 in deposits. The bank was originally founded to capitalize on the booming lumber, cotton, and wool trades and also the market for poultry and produce.

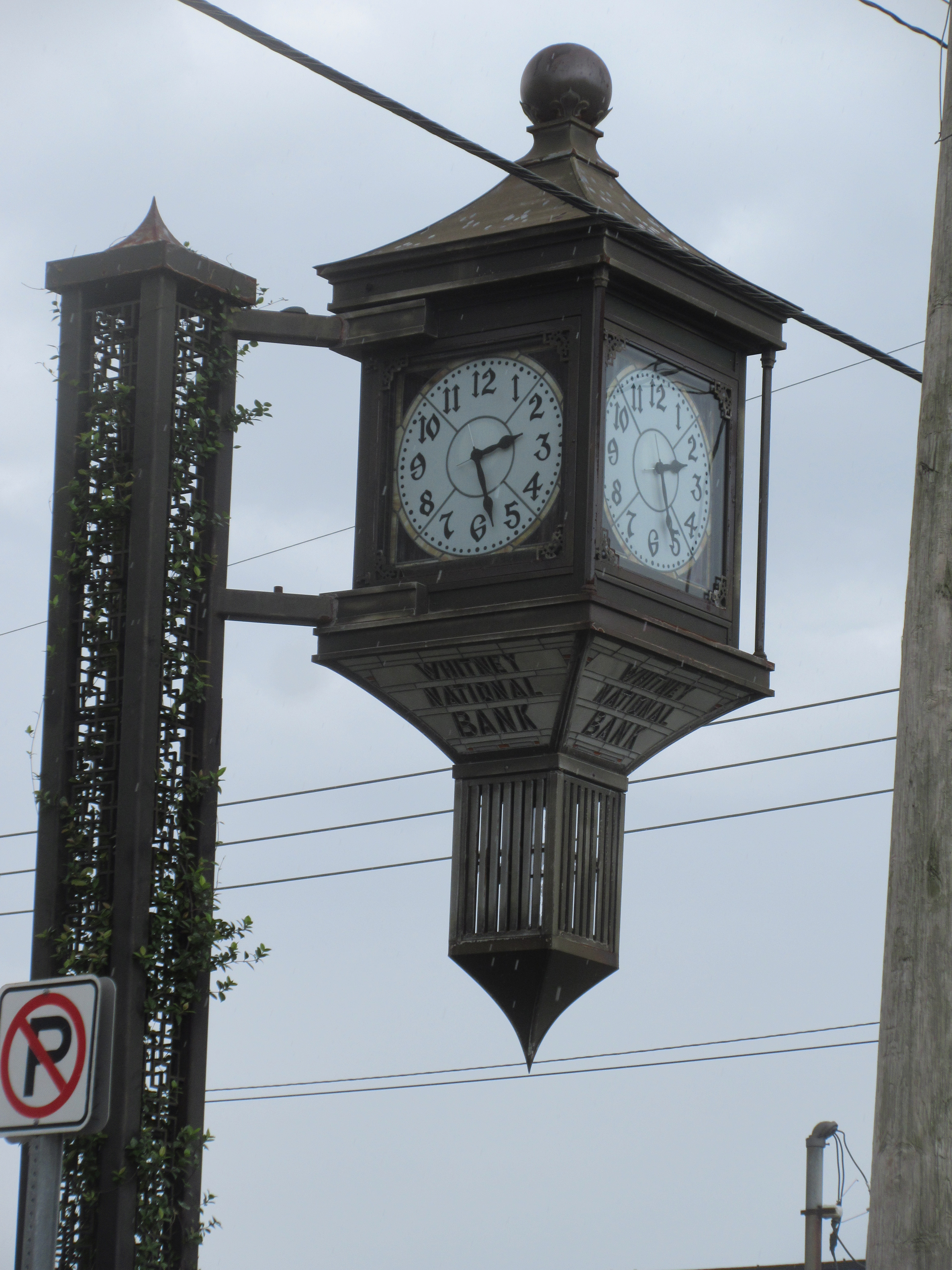
One of the long iconic clocks outside of Whitney Bank branches

During the Wall Street crash of 1929, 162 Mississippi banks failed, leaving Gulfport without a bank. Some Gulfport residents were already customers at the Long Beach, Mississippi branch and several Gulfport businessmen appealed to the bank to open a downtown Gulfport branch. The bank opened a branch at the corner of 13th Street and 26th Avenue in the former First National Bank of Gulfport Building. In 1933, the bank moved to the location that would become One Hancock Plaza in downtown Gulfport, and the company changed its domicile to Gulfport and renamed the company Hancock Bank.

Hancock Bank acquired Baton Rouge, Louisiana-based American Bank of Baton Rouge in 1990; Washington Bank and Trust Co. of Franklinton, Louisiana for $15 million in 1994; and American Security Bank based in Ville Platte, Louisiana in 1999, raising assets to $3 billion. It acquired Lamar Bank, opening up the south-central Mississippi marketplace and establishing a presence in Hattiesburg, Mississippi, in 2001; and Tallahassee, Florida-based Guaranty National Bank and its 5 branches in 2004.

Additionally, bank's insurance services were expanded by acquiring the 103-year-old Ross King Walker, Inc., based in Hattiesburg in 2004; and J. Everett Eaves, Inc., based in New Orleans in 2005.

In 2006, Hancock Bank of Alabama was issued a charter to operate in Alabama.

In 2009, the bank acquired Peoples First Bank of Panama City, Florida after the latter was seized by the Office of Thrift Supervision after suffering from bank failure. In 2011, the bank acquired Whitney Holding Corporation, owner of the New Orleans based Whitney Bank, established in 1883. In 2017, the bank acquired First NBC Bank, which was seized by regulators after suffering from bank failure.

In May 2018, the company changed its name to Hancock Whitney Corp.

In 2018, Hancock Whitney acquired the Trust and Asset Management business from Capital One. In 2019, Hancock Whitney purchased MidSouth Bank.

In November 2026, Hancock Whitney announced a deal to buy Trustmark in a ~$3.2 billion all-stock deal. The resulting bank would have ~$58 billion in assets.

== See also ==
- Hancock Whitney Stadium
