= List of tallest buildings in Louisiana =

This lists ranks Louisiana skyscrapers that stand at least 250 feet (76 m) tall, based on standard height measurement. This includes spires and architectural details but does not include antenna masts. An equal sign (=) following a rank indicates the same height between two or more buildings. The "Year" column indicates the year in which a building was completed.

Rank	Name	Image	Location	Height feet (m)	Floors	Year	Notes
1	Hancock Whitney Center		New Orleans	697 (212)	51	1972	Has been the tallest building in New Orleans and Louisiana since 1972; tallest building in the Southeastern United States at the time of its completion; first Southeastern skyscraper to rise higher than 656 feet (200 m); tallest building constructed in the city in the 1970s.
2	Place St. Charles		New Orleans	645 (197)	53	1984	Has more floors than any other building in the city; tallest building constructed in New Orleans in the 1980s
3	Plaza Tower		New Orleans	531 (162)	45	1969	Tallest building constructed in the city in the 1960s; since 2002 the tallest unused building in the city.
4	Energy Centre		New Orleans	530 (160)	39	1984	Introduces a unique "Honeycomb" design.
5	First Bank and Trust Tower		New Orleans	481 (147)	36	1987	Post-modern styling.
6	Sheraton New Orleans		New Orleans	479 (146)	48	1985	Tallest building used exclusively as a hotel in New Orleans.
7	Louisiana State Capitol		Baton Rouge	460 (140)	34	1932	Tallest building in Baton Rouge, tallest building in Louisiana not located in New Orleans, and tallest capitol building in the United States. It is located on a 27-acre (110,000 m^{2}) tract, which includes the capitol gardens. The Louisiana State Capitol is often thought of as "Huey Long's monument" due to the influence of the former Governor and U.S. Senator in getting the capitol built.
8	New Orleans Marriott		New Orleans	449 (137)	42	1972	Tallest building on the downriver side of Canal Street.
9	400 Poydras Tower		New Orleans	442 (135)	32	1983	Introduces a sleek all black glass design.
10	One Canal Place		New Orleans	440 (130)	32	1979	Built in 1979. Was not the tallest building in N.O. when built.
11	1010 Common		New Orleans	438 (134)	31	1970	
12	2 Canal Street		New Orleans	407 (124)	33	1967	
13	Benson Tower		New Orleans	406 (124)	26	1989	
14	Three Lakeway Center		Metairie	403 (123)	34	1987	Tallest building in Metairie and Jefferson Parish. Tallest building in Louisiana outside of New Orleans and Baton Rouge.
15	JW Marriott Hotel New Orleans		New Orleans	386 (118)	30	1984	
16	The Westin New Orleans Canal Place		New Orleans	373 (114)	29	1983	
17	Regions Tower		Shreveport	364 (111)	25	1986	Tallest building in Shreveport and Northern Louisiana.
18	225 Baronne Street		New Orleans	362 (110)	29	1965	
19	Hyatt Regency New Orleans		New Orleans	361 (110)	32	1976	
20	Entergy Tower		New Orleans	360 (110)	28	1983	
21	Hibernia Bank Building		New Orleans	355 (108)	20	1921	Tallest building constructed in New Orleans in the 1920s.
22	L'Auberge du Lac Resort		Lake Charles	343 (105)	26	2005	Tallest building in the city of Lake Charles and Acadiana.
23	1250 Poydras Plaza		New Orleans	342 (104)	24	1979	
24=	Hilton New Orleans Riverside		New Orleans	341 (104)	29	1977	
24=	1515 Poydras		New Orleans	341 (104)	29	1984	
26	National American Bank Building		New Orleans	330 (100)	23	1929	
27	Harrah's New Orleans - Poydras Street Hotel		New Orleans	327 (100)	26	2006	Tallest building constructed in the city in the 2000s.
28	Pan American Life Center		New Orleans	322 (98)	27	1989	
29	One American Place		Baton Rouge	310 (94)	24	1974	
30	Louisiana Tower	—	Shreveport	302 (92)	21	1984	Tallest building in Shreveport from 1984 to 1986.
31	Poydras Center		New Orleans	300 (91)	28	1983	
32	Harrah's Shreveport		Shreveport	290 (88)	23	2001	
33	Golden Nugget Lake Charles		Lake Charles	288 (88)	25	2014	
34	1440 Canal	—	New Orleans	288 (88)	21	1972	
35	Horseshoe Casino Hotel		Bossier City	286 (87)	26	1999	Tallest building in Bossier City.
36	Orleans Tower		New Orleans	280 (85)	20	1977	
37=	Charity Hospital		New Orleans	279 (85)	20	1939	Tallest building constructed in the city in the 1930s; tallest hospital in New Orleans.
37=	Le Méridien New Orleans		New Orleans	279 (85)	23	1984	Note: Picture shown is the W Hotel. As of December 15, 2014, the hotel is now the Le Méridien New Orleans.
39	Chase Tower		Baton Rouge	277 (84)	21	1968	
40=	Loews New Orleans Hotel		New Orleans	276 (84)	22	1972	
40=	Freeport McMoRan Building	—	New Orleans	276 (84)	23	1974	
42	Mercedes-Benz Superdome		New Orleans	273 (83)	—	1972	
43=	930 Poydras		New Orleans	270 (82)	21	2010	Tallest building constructed in the city in the 2010s; most recently completed skyscraper in the city.
43=	Four Winds		New Orleans	270 (82)	19	1927	
45	The Galleria		Metairie	269 (82)	21	1986	
46	Beck Building	—	Shreveport	265 (81)	20	1957	Tallest building in Shreveport from 1957 to 1984.
47	1555 Poydras		New Orleans	262 (80)	22	1984	
48	Two Lakeway Center	—	Metairie	259 (79)	19	1983	
49	Windsor Court Hotel		New Orleans	253 (77)	22	1984	
50	First National Bank of Commerce Building	—	New Orleans	252 (77)	19	1927	

== Timeline of tallest buildings in Louisiana ==
Name	Years as tallest	Height feet (m)	Floors
The Roosevelt New Orleans	1907–1920	211 (64)	14
Hibernia Bank Building	1920–1932	355 (108)	23
Louisiana State Capitol	1932–1969	460 (140)	34
Plaza Tower	1969–1972	531 (162)	45
Hancock Whitney Center	1972–present	697 (212)	51

== See also ==
- List of tallest buildings in New Orleans
- List of tallest buildings in Baton Rouge
- Le Méridien New Orleans
