= Exxon Building =

Exxon Building may refer to:

- Exxon Building (New York)
- ExxonMobil Building, Houston, formerly the Exxon Building and Humble Building
- 1555 Poydras, New Orleans, formerly named Exxon Building
