= New Orleans Exchange Centre =

Exchange Centre
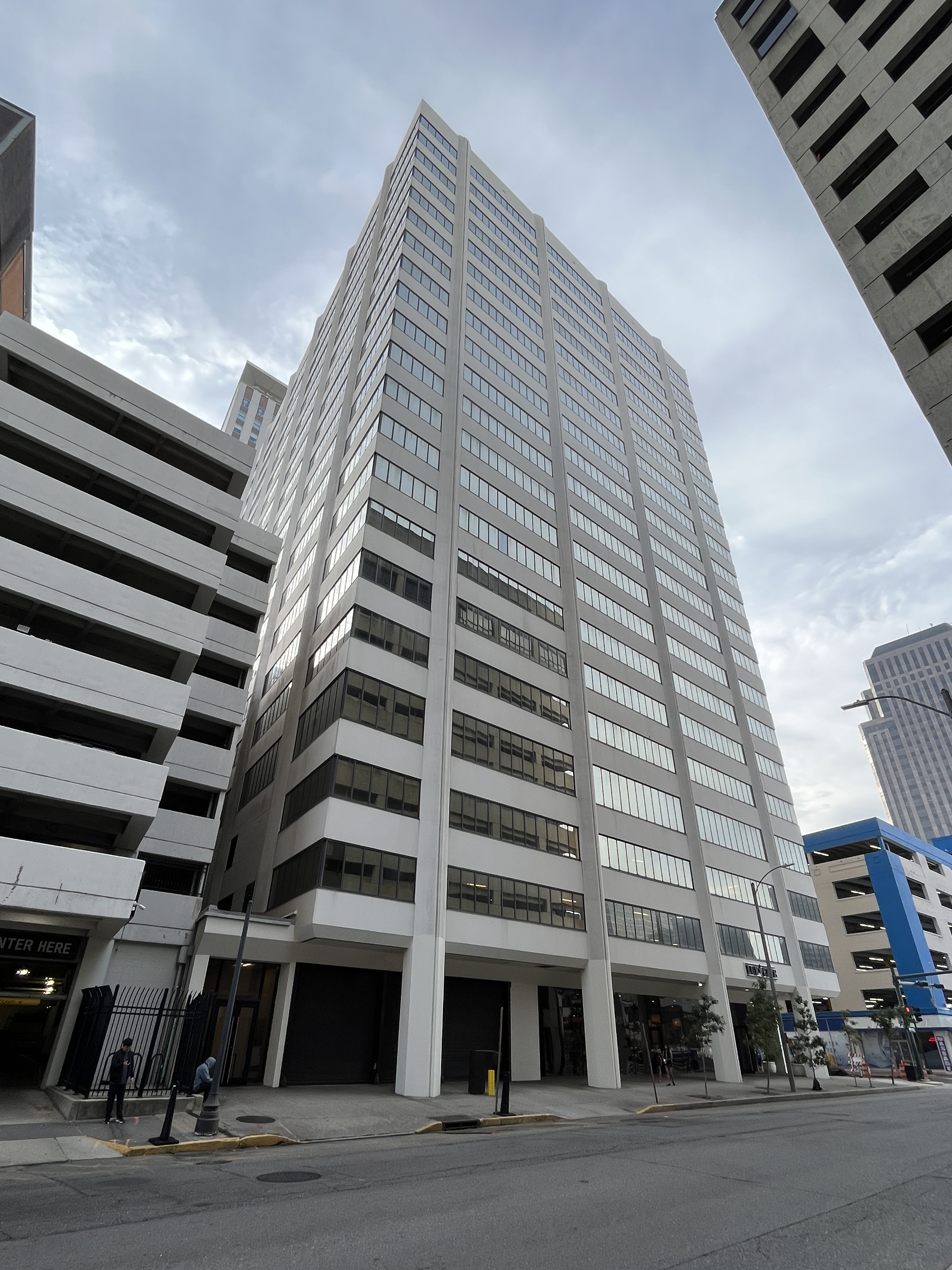

General information
- Location: 935 Gravier Street; New Orleans, LA 70112; United States
- Coordinates: 29.953075°N 90.073171°W
- Completed: 1981
- Owner: Exchange Centre, LLC

Height
- Antenna spire: Helipad (48LA)
- Roof: 238 feet (73 m)
- Top floor: 22

Technical details
- Floor count: 21
- Floor area: Office: 378,895 square feet (35,200 m^{2})
- Lifts/elevators: 6

Design and construction
- Architect(s): Stanley Muller & Associates

New Orleans Exchange Centre, formerly known as Chevron Place, located at 935 Gravier Street in the Central Business District of New Orleans, Louisiana, is a 21-story, 238 feet (73 m)-tall skyscraper designed in the international style by Stanley Muller & Associates. Kingfish Development purchased the building from Chevron in 2010, using it primarily as leasable office space for more than a dozen businesses.

== Tenants ==
The following is an up-to-date list of the businesses currently leasing space in the Exchange Center (as provided by the building's the owners, Kingfish Development).

- G & O Food Company
- Hess Deynoodt Marketing Inc.
- Brown Greer
- BP Econ & Prop Damages Trust
- New Orleans Ballet Association
- Nord Foundation
- Edward Wisner Donation
- Coleman Partners Architects
- Sangisetty Law Firm, L.L.C.
- Arts Council of New Orleans
- Renewable Energy
- Postlethwaite & Netterville
- Fogo Data Solutions
- The Receivables Exchange
- Entertainment Partners
- Trufund Financial Services Inc
- James P. Raymond Jr Foundation
- Institute of Women & Ethic Studies
- Kara Hadican Samuels & Associates
- Search Influence
- Garretson Firm Resolution Group
- TurboSquid
- Kickboard Inc
- Centre Technologies
- CivicSource
- Carrollton
- LOOKFAR
- Murphy & North
- Medo & Tete
- Fleur De Lis Capital
- Gertler Law Firm
- Sutton & Reitano
- AlliedPRA
- ADR Inc
- Benefits Administration, L.L.C.
- MDL 2179 Class Counsel
- Herman Herman & Katz L.L.C.
- Kennedy Financial Group
- New Orleans Business Alliance
- Offshore Marine Service Association
- First American Title Insurance
- Garden City Group
- Leger & Shaw
- Oseberg
- ARtscapes
- Easterseals Louisiana, Inc.

== See also ==
- List of tallest buildings in New Orleans
