= Sheraton New Orleans =

Coordinates: 29.9520°N 90.0681°W

Sheraton New Orleans Hotel
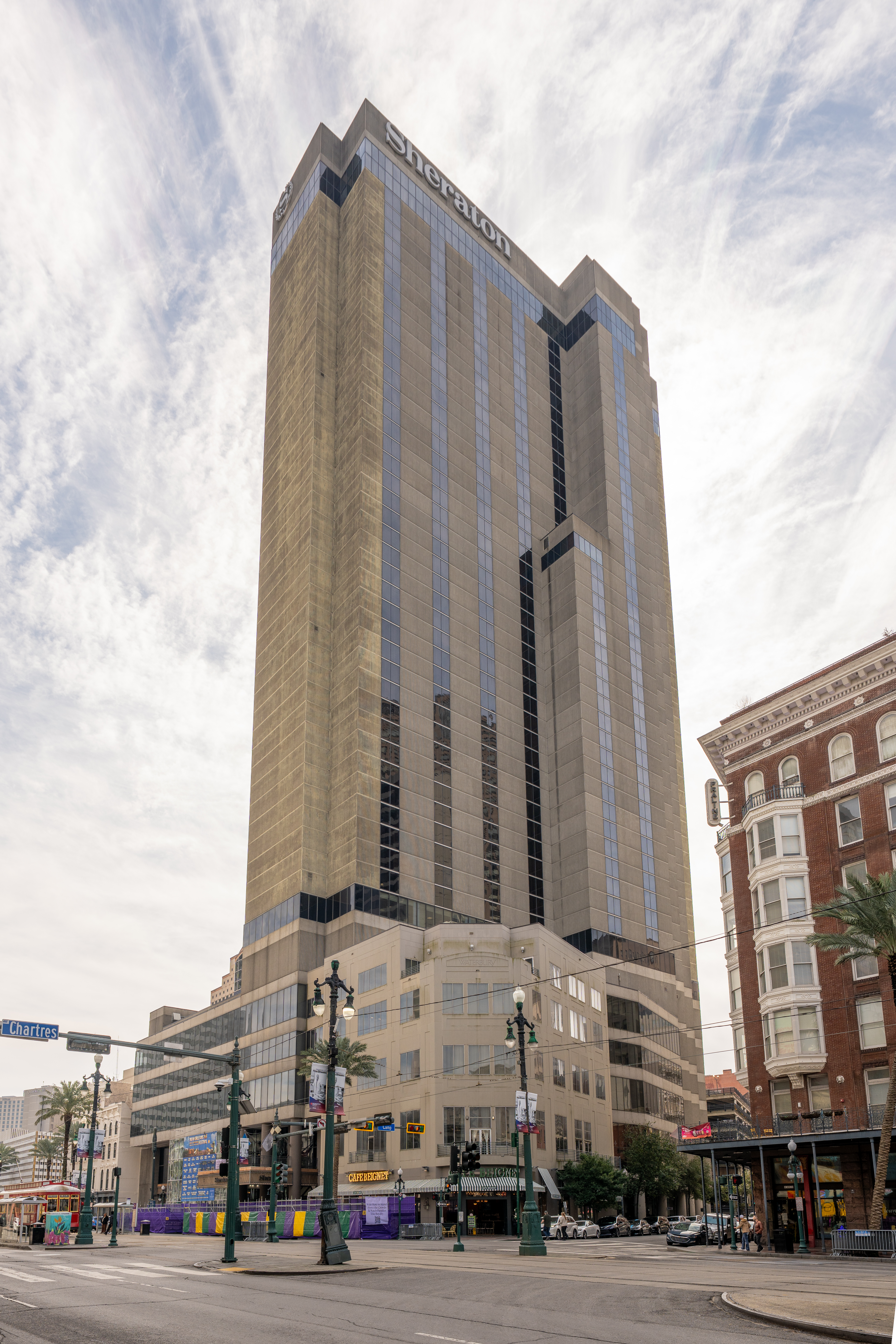
- (2026)
- Interactive map of the Sheraton New Orleans Hotel area

General information
- Type: Hotel
- Location: 500 Canal Street; New Orleans, LA; United States
- Completed: 1982

Height
- Antenna spire: N/A
- Roof: 490 feet (149 m)

Technical details
- Floor count: 49
- Lifts/elevators: 22 (6 low rise & 6 high rise & 9 Service & 1 large freight)

Design and construction
- Architect: Farnet & Tabher

Sheraton Hotel is a 49-story, 490-foot (149 m) hotel that is located at 500 Canal Street in the Central Business District of New Orleans, Louisiana. The Sheraton is the 6th tallest building in New Orleans, and the hotel is part of Marriott International.

The hotel was evacuated when Hurricane Katrina struck the city in 2005. There were 1,000 people in the hotel during the storm, and they were taken to the Sheraton Park Central in Dallas, TX. Only two of the 1,100 rooms in the hotel suffered damage, and most of the rooms were being occupied by contractors, medical professionals, and members of the press.

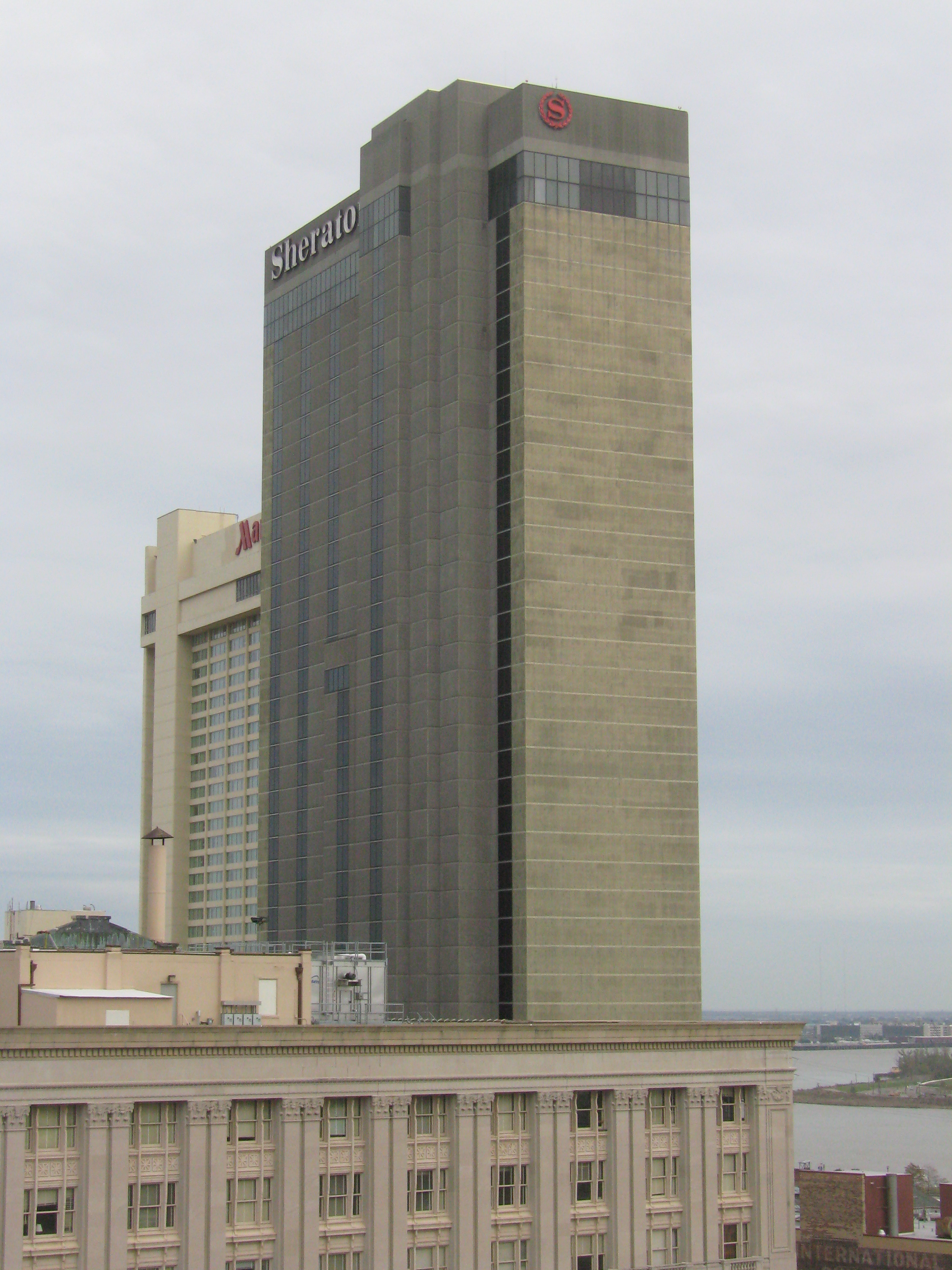
Sheraton Hotel from Hilton New Orleans skydeck

== See also ==
- List of tallest buildings in Louisiana
