= Amoco Building =

Amoco Building may refer to:

- Amoco Building (Chicago), now known as Aon Center
- Amoco Building (New Orleans), now known as Orleans Tower
