= Benson Tower (New Orleans) =

Skyscraper in New Orleans, LA

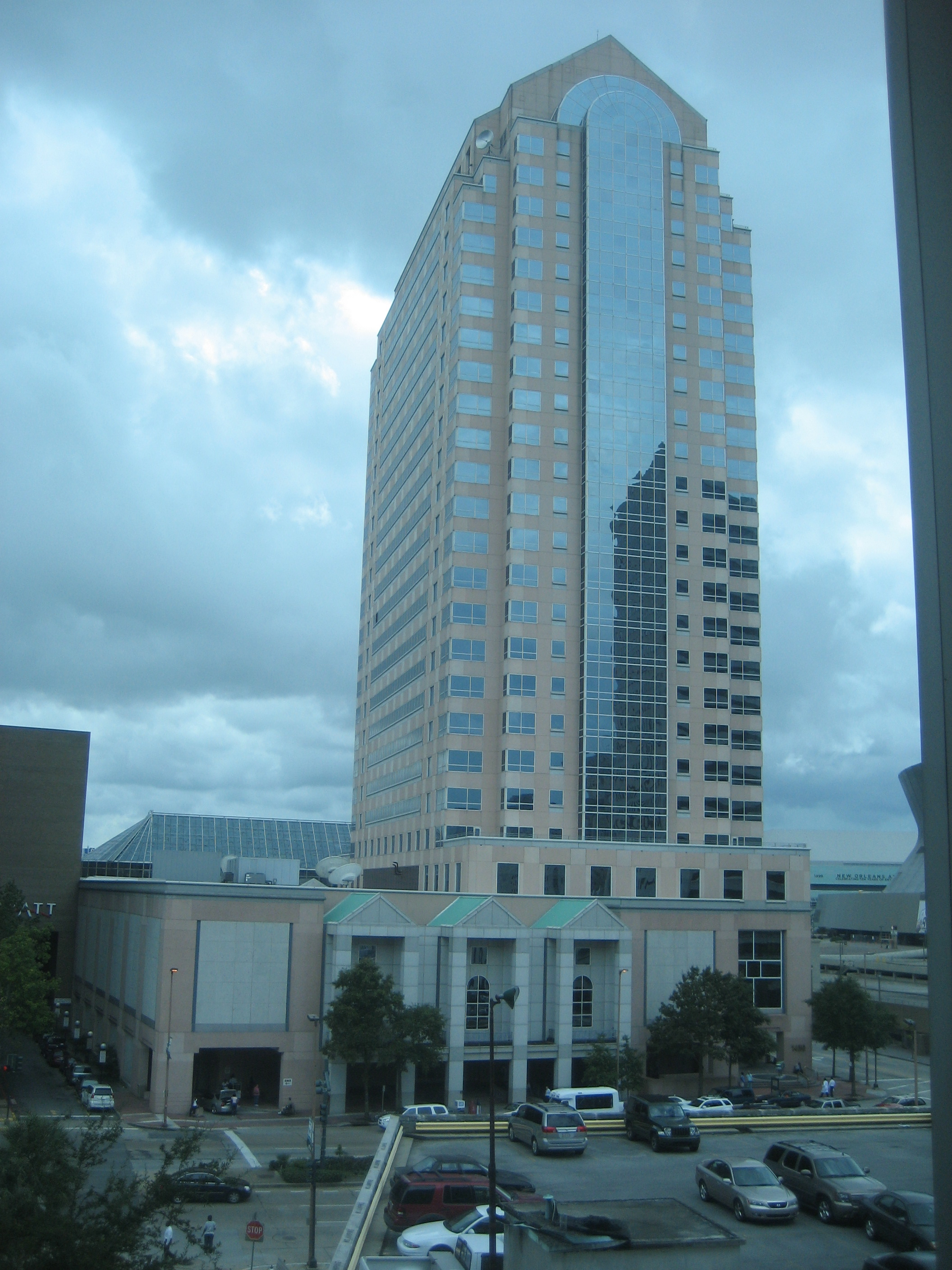
- Interactive map of the Benson Tower area

General information
- Type: Office
- Location: 1450 Poydras Street; New Orleans, LA; United States
- Coordinates: 29.951336°N 90.078035°W
- Completed: 1989
- Owner: Zelia LLC

Height
- Roof: 406 feet (124 m)

Technical details
- Floor count: 26
- Floor area: Office: 486,692 sq ft (45,215.2 m^{2})

Design and construction
- Architect: Hellmuth, Obata & Kassabaum-1989 Renovation by Woodward Design Group of Woodward Design+Build
- Main contractor: Woodward Design+Build

Benson Tower (formerly Dominion Tower and the CNG Tower), located at 1450 Poydras Street in the Central Business District of New Orleans, Louisiana, is a 26-story, 406 feet (124 m)-tall skyscraper. The building was purchased by late New Orleans Saints owner Tom Benson on September 15, 2009 and renamed the Benson Tower. In 2012, Ochsner Health System moved executives and as many as 750 administrative employees to the top four floors as well as the 2nd and 3rd floor space with balconies overlooking Champions Square and the Caesars Superdome; second floor space is utilized for Benson's television station, Fox affiliate WVUE (Channel 8) for the station's morning newscast, sporting events and by lease for other parties. According to Corporate Realty, which leases the 487,760 sq ft (45,314 m^{2}) building, as of August 2012, Benson Tower is more than 97.6% leased.

== Location ==
1450 Poydras Street
New Orleans, LA

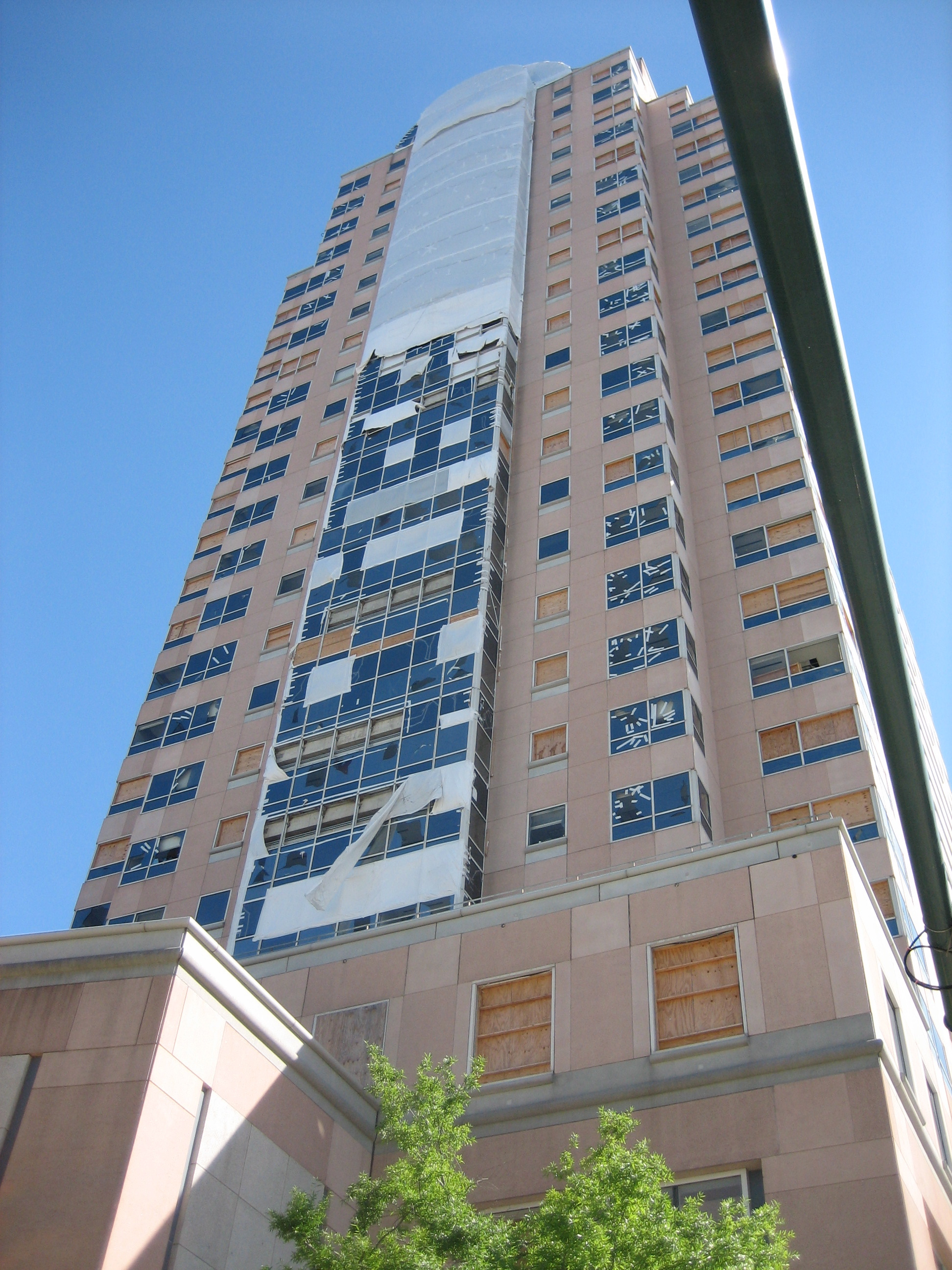
Broken windows after Hurricane Katrina

It is part of a complex of connected buildings which includes the Caesars Superdome, 1250 Poydras Plaza, Entergy Tower, Orleans Tower and the Hyatt Regency New Orleans.

== See also ==
- List of tallest buildings in New Orleans
