= Hibernia Bank Building =

Hibernia Bank Building may refer to:

- Hibernia Bank Building (New Orleans), built in 1921, the headquarters of the former Hibernia National Bank, founded in 1870 and bought by Capital One in 2005.
- Hibernia Bank Building (San Francisco), built in 1892, the headquarters of the Hibernia Savings and Loan Society, later the Hibernia Bank, founded in 1859 and bought by Security Pacific Bank in 1988.
