= Hyatt Regency New Orleans =

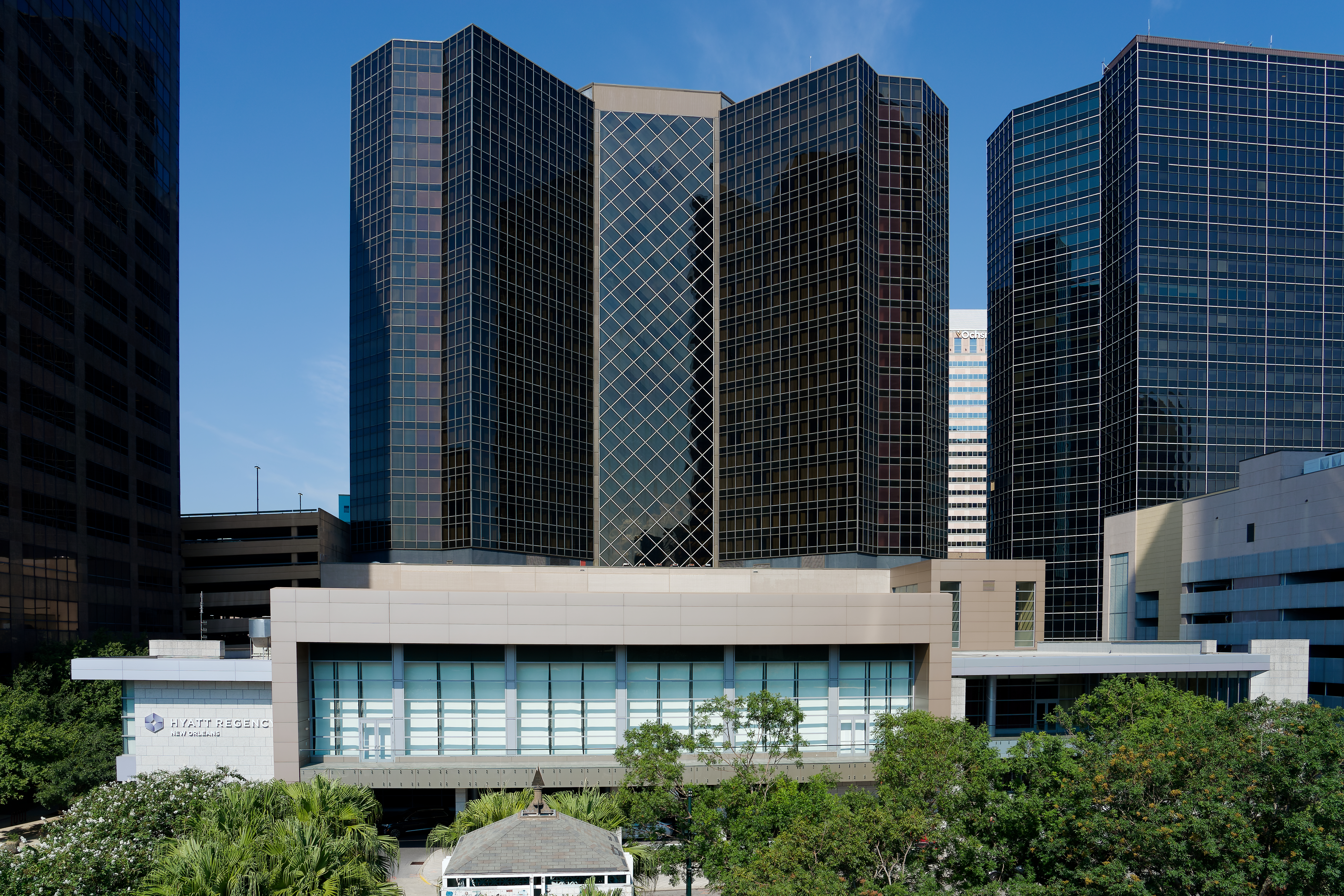
- Hyatt Regency New Orleans, 2023
- Interactive map of the Hyatt Regency New Orleans area

General information
- Type: Hotel
- Location: 601 Loyola Ave; New Orleans, LA; United States
- Coordinates: 29.9495°N 90.0764°W
- Completed: 1976
- Renovated: 2005-2011

Height
- Roof: 361 feet (110 m)

Technical details
- Floor count: 32

Other information
- Number of rooms: 1,193

The Hyatt Regency New Orleans is a 32-story, 361-foot (110 m) hotel located at 601 Loyola Ave in the Central Business District of New Orleans, Louisiana, US, opened in 1976. It has 1,193 guest rooms, including 95 suites. It is part of a complex of connected buildings, which includes the Mercedes-Benz Superdome, 1250 Poydras Plaza, Entergy Tower, and the Benson Tower. It was designed by Welton Becket and Associates. The Hyatt was severely damaged by Hurricane Katrina in 2005 and remained closed until 2011.

== History ==
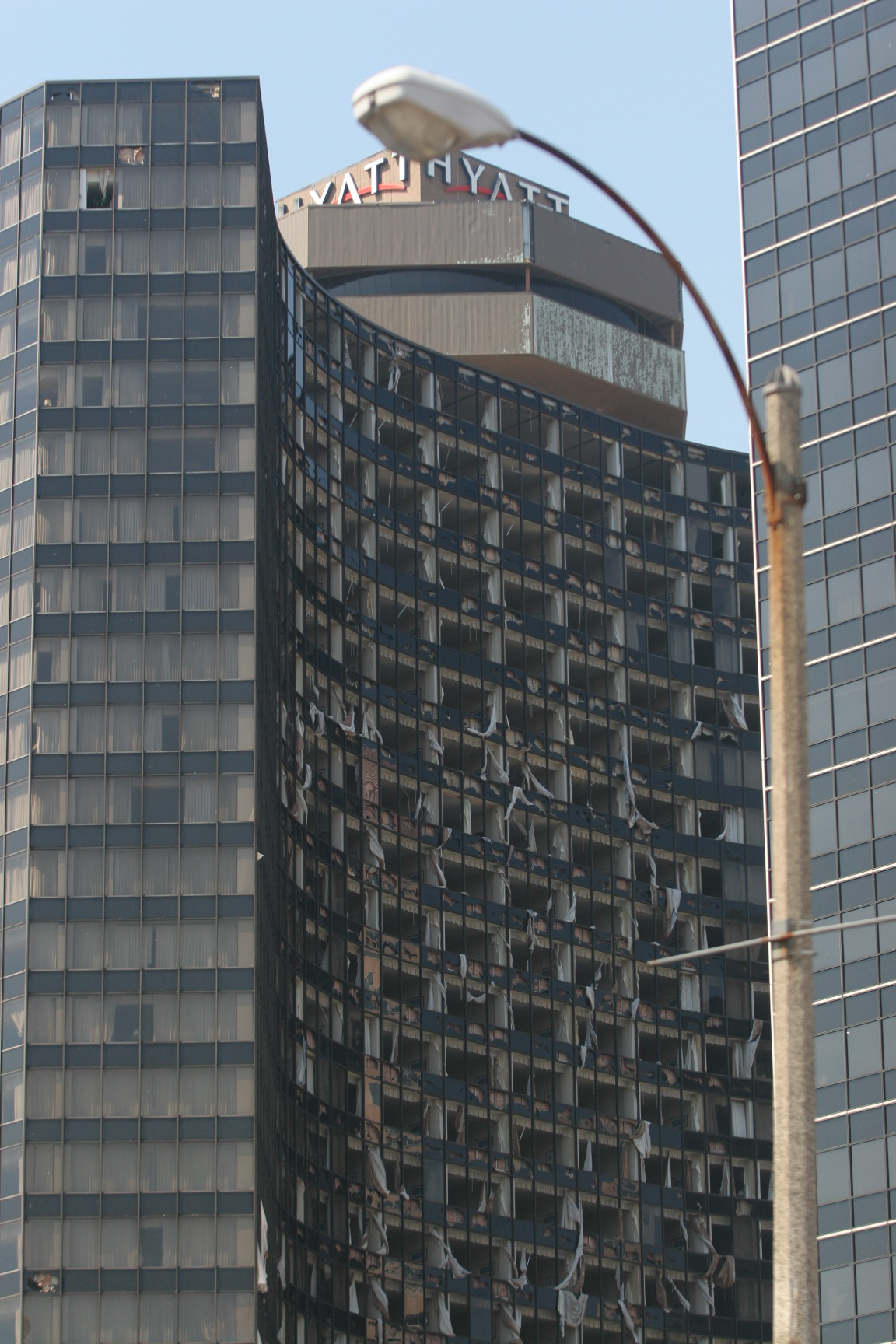
Broken windows on the facade of the Hyatt Regency New Orleans after Hurricane Katrina, September 12, 2005

=== Hurricane Katrina damage ===
The hotel received extensive damage when Hurricane Katrina made landfall in the city on August 29, 2005, where all of the windows of the hotel were blown out by severe winds, and water and debris were blown into the guest rooms and atrium lobby. There was feces and urine in the lobby, shattered glass everywhere, backed up toilets, and extreme heat, as the air conditioning did not work due to generator failure. In response the guests were evacuated to the ballrooms, along with stranded city residents. On August 31, a convoy of food and supplies provided by Hyatt hotels in Atlanta and Houston arrived. The hotel provided shelter for New Orleans Mayor Ray Nagin, the New Orleans Police Department and Fire Department, the Louisiana National Guard, the Federal Emergency Management Agency (FEMA), the Army Corps of Engineers, and some displaced residents who managed to sneak in from the Superdome nearby. On September 2, 2005, the approximately 900 hotel guests were evacuated by bus or by car; none were suffering from major illnesses or injuries.

=== Closure and renovation ===
As a result of the damage sustained during Katrina, the hotel remained closed for six years. Investors including previous hotel owners Chicago-based Strategic Hotels and Resorts Inc. planned in 2006 to redevelop the area around the Superdome into a performance art park, but this was abandoned.

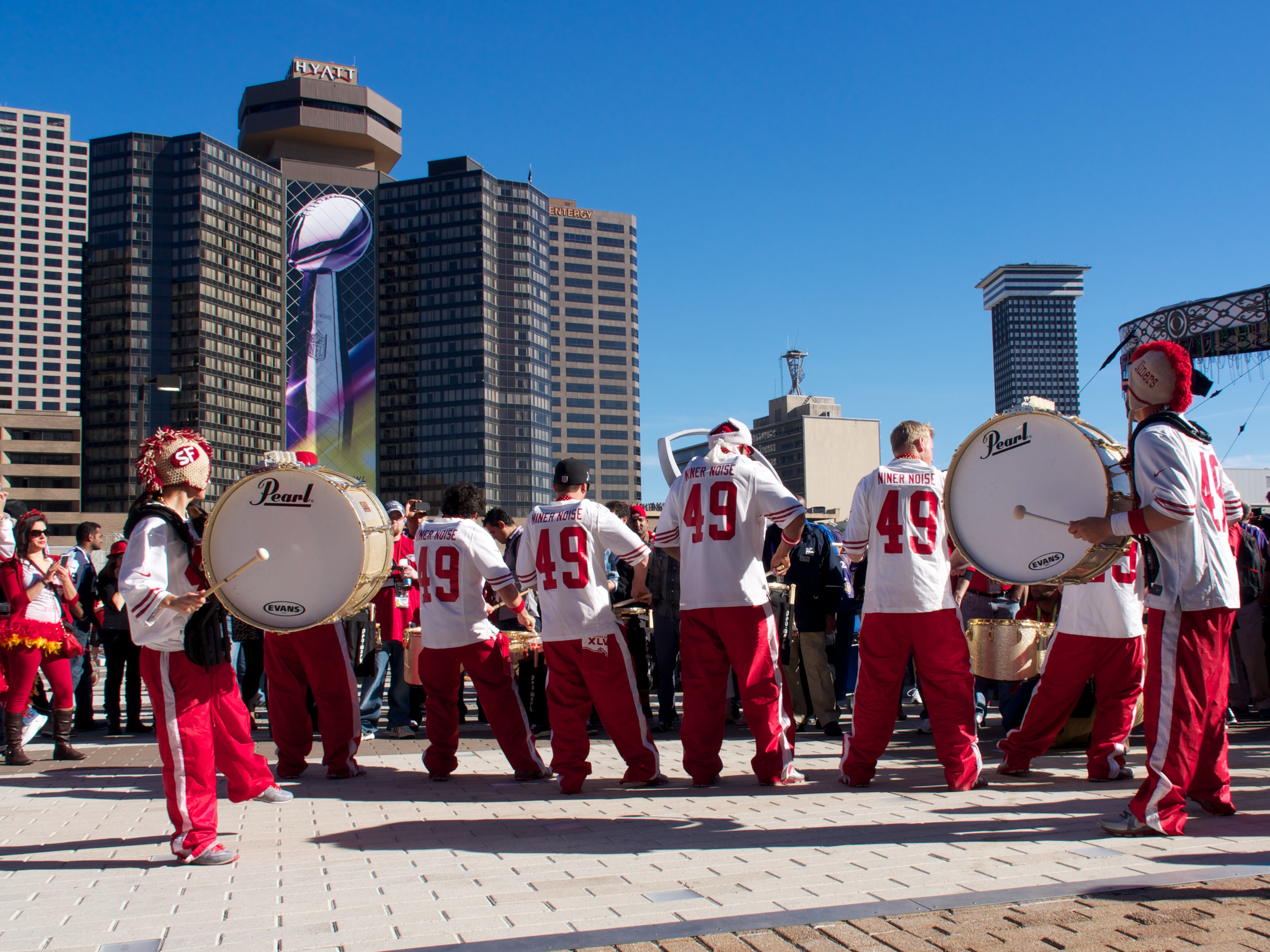
Rear of Hyatt hotel from Champions Square

Poydras Properties Hotel Holdings acquired the Hyatt from Strategic Hotels & Resorts Inc. for US$32 million in 2007.

On February 20, 2009, the State Bond Commission approved $225 million in special low-cost bonds to help renovate the Hyatt Regency.

Hyatt in August 2010 announced a $275 million redevelopment effort. The redesign of the 32-story building included 200,000 square feet (19,000 m^{2}) of meeting and exhibition space, two restaurants, two bars, and a coffee bar.

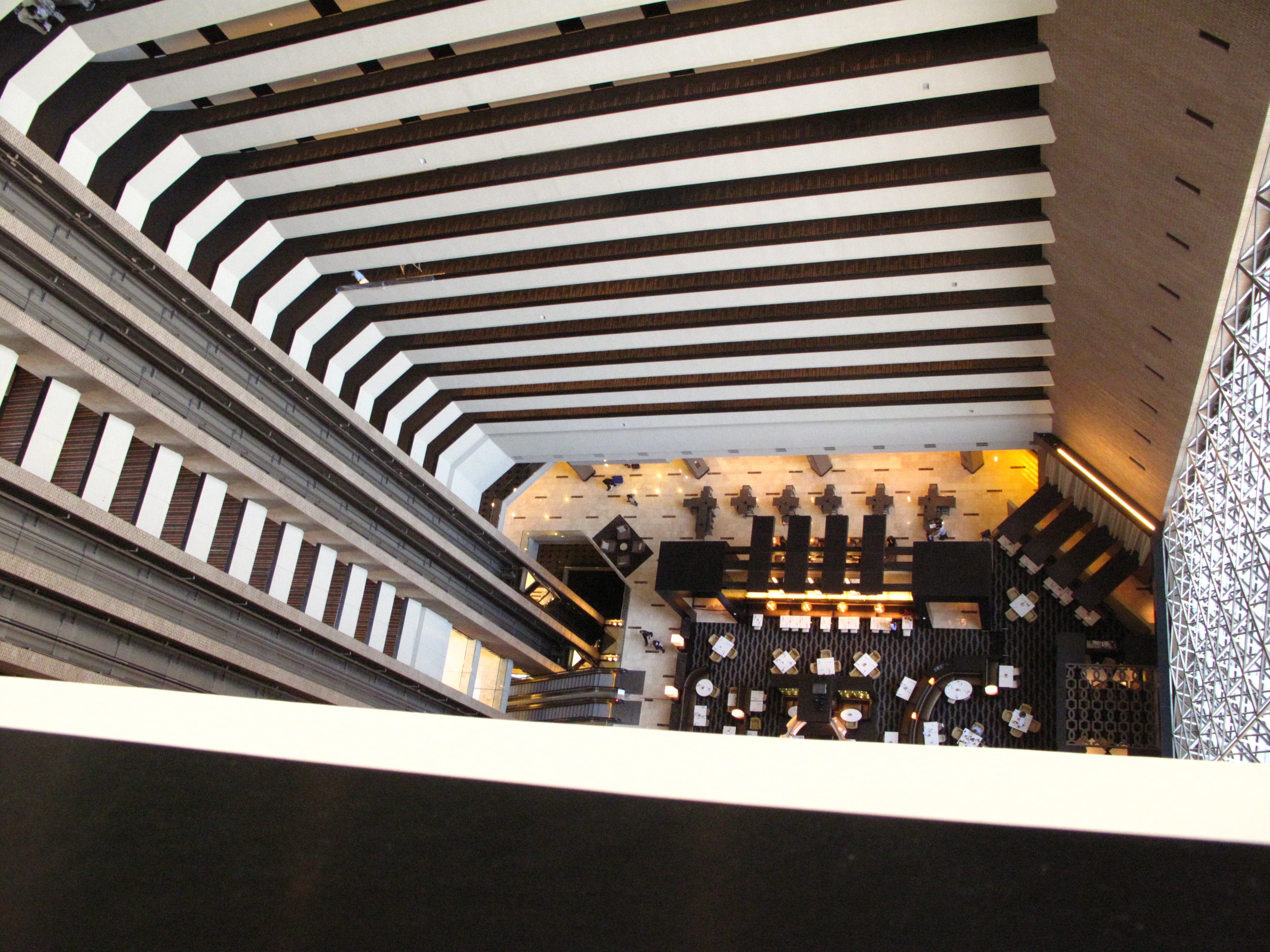
The atrium of the Hyatt Regency New Orleans

=== Reopening ===
The hotel officially reopened on October 19, 2011 with several major changes to its interior and technological additions. An exhibit hall was constructed by re-purposing the hotel's old porte-cochère, or motor lobby. The storm-battered area around the newly rebranded Superdome experienced major construction, renovation, and overall economic changes following Hurricane Katrina, which continued to be supported by the rebuilt Hyatt Regency. The Central Business District's post-disaster development included Champions Square, the sports district, and the Biotech District. The entrance to the Hyatt Regency also faces the newly constructed Loyola Streetcar line, which provides access to the Central Business District (CBD). including the French Quarter.

== Recognition ==
The Hyatt Regency New Orleans work was reported by Forbes magazine as one of the Top 10 Hotel Renovations in 2012 because of several notable features including its in-house restaurant.

== See also ==
- List of tallest buildings in New Orleans
