= List of tallest buildings in New Orleans =

Skyline of New Orleans
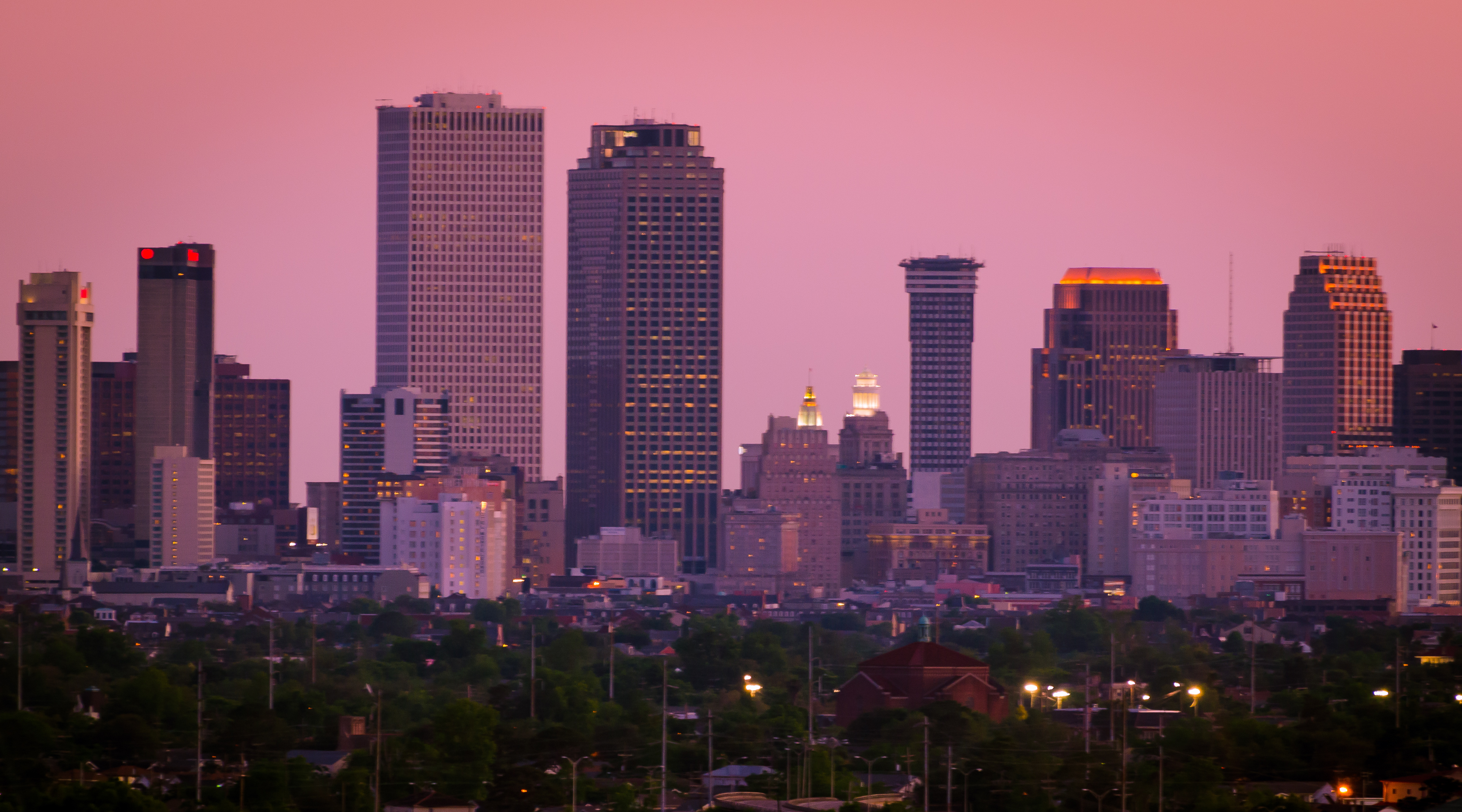
- Central Business District of New Orleans
- Tallest building: Hancock Whitney Center (1972)
- Tallest building height: 697 ft (212 m)
- First 150 m+ building: Plaza Tower (1969)

Number of tall buildings (2026)
- Taller than 100 m (328 ft): 23
- Taller than 150 m (492 ft): 4
- Taller than 200 m (656 ft): 1

Number of tall buildings — feet
- Taller than 200 ft (61.0 m): 57
- Taller than 300 ft (91.4 m): 26

New Orleans, the largest city in the U.S. state of Louisiana, is the site of 120 high-rises, 57 of which are taller than 200 feet (61 m) as of 2026. 26 such buildings reach a height of over 300 ft (91 m), while four skyscrapers stand taller than 492 ft (150 m), making its skyline the largest in the West South Central states outside of Texas. The tallest building in New Orleans and in Louisiana is Hancock Whitney Center (known as One Shell Square until 2018), which rises 697 feet (212 m) and was completed in 1972. Most of the city's tallest buildings are located in the city's Central Business District, which is bounded to the east by the Mississippi River. In the New Orleans metropolitan area, the unincorporated community of Metairie is home to five additional high-rises taller than 200 ft (61 m).

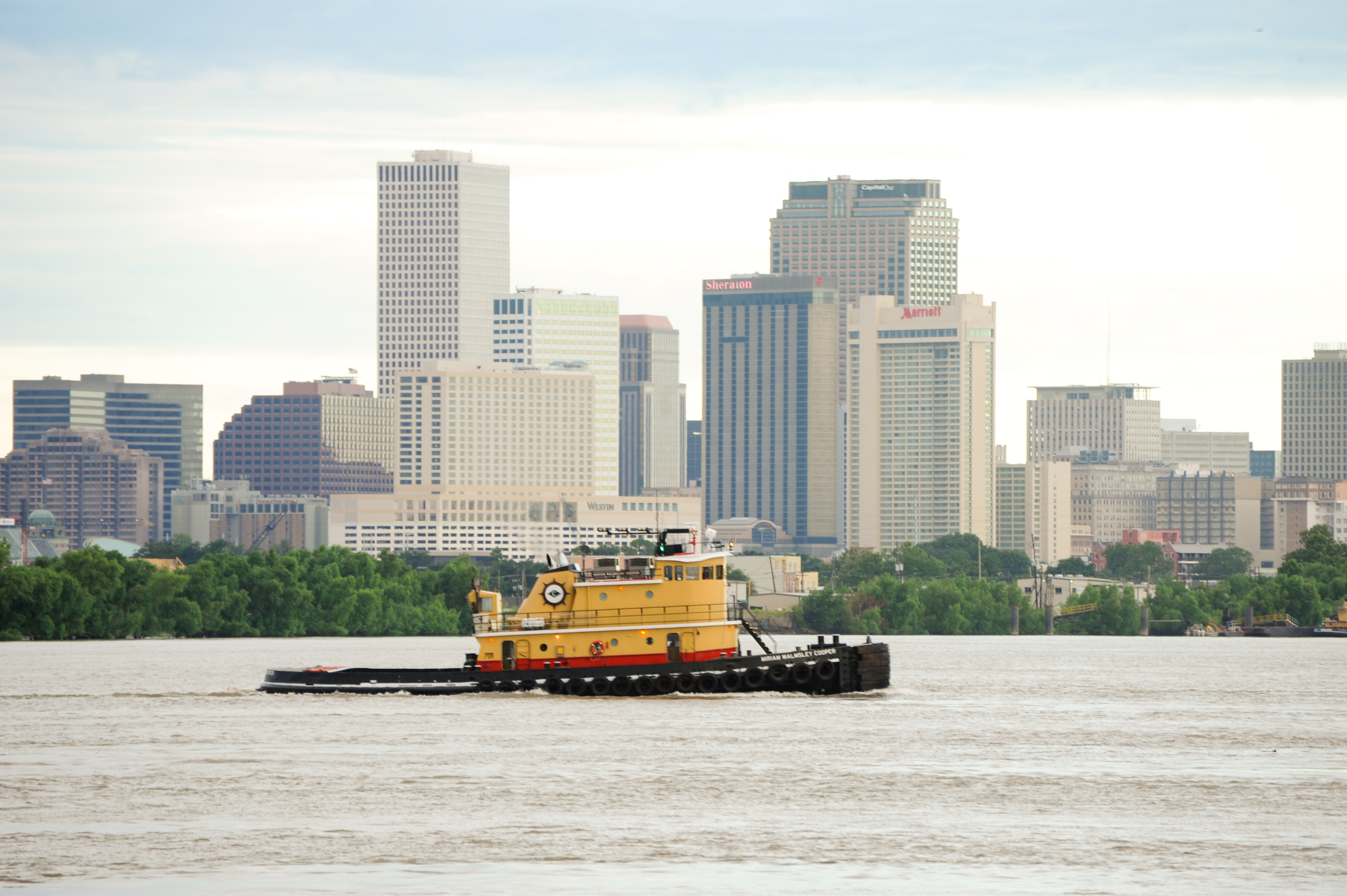
Skyline of New Orleans with the Mississippi River

The history of skyscrapers in New Orleans began with the construction of the Hennan Building in 1895. Rising 158 feet (48 m), it is often regarded as the first skyscraper in New Orleans. During the first half of the 20th century, the skyline of New Orleans mostly consisted of low and mid-rise structures. The soft soils of New Orleans are susceptible to subsidence, and there was doubt about the feasibility of constructing large high-rises in such an environment. The 20-story Hibernia Bank Building, constructed in 1921 at a height of 211 feet (64 m), held the title of the tallest in New Orleans for 44 years. One building that came close was the National American Bank Building, which rose to a height of 330 ft (101 m).

The 1960s saw the skyline reach greater heights, as the title of the city's tallest building was taken by 225 Baronne Street in 1965, then the World Trade Center in 1967. The Plaza Tower, completed in 1969, was the first building to exceed 500 feet (152 m). Shortly after, Hancock Whitney Center became the city's tallest building in 1972. The oil boom of the late 1970s and early 1980s led to a surge in high-rise construction in New Orleans, with the number of buildings taller than 300 ft (91 m) increasing from 9 to 22 between 1975 and 1985. Many of these high-rises were built along Poydras Street, which has emerged as the city's principal high-rise corridor in addition to Canal Street. Following the end of the oil boom, high-rise development has declined.

Hurricane Katrina, which struck New Orleans in 2005, caused many high-rises in the city to suffer damage, including flooding and blown out windows. As New Orleans recovered from the hurricane, various high-rise projects have been proposed, but have been stymied by material and labor costs, leading to the elimination of most. The tallest tower approved for construction in New Orleans was Trump International Hotel & Tower, which would have become the tallest building in the city at a height of 842 ft (257 m), but was cancelled in 2011. Instead, the tallest building constructed in the 21st century is The Odeon at South Market, a 29-story residential tower built in 2020. Due to the city's strong tourism industry, a significant number of older high-rises have undergone renovations to apartment and hotel towers since 2010.

== History ==
Number of buildings by height in New Orleans by the end of each year, based on the information in this article. This takes into account the demolition of the Grand Palace Hotel. Click on the legend to toggle a specific height on or off. View chart definition.

== Map of tallest buildings ==
The map below shows the location of buildings taller than 200 ft (61 m) in New Orleans, all of which are in the city's Central Business District. Each marker is numbered by the building's height rank, and colored by the decade of its completion.

Buildings taller than 200 ft (61 m) in New Orleans.
- 1950s and before
- 1960s
- 1970s
- 1980s
- 1990s
- 2000s
- 2010s
- 2020s
1 Hancock Whitney Center
2 Place St. Charles
3 Plaza Tower
4 Energy Centre
5 BankPlus Tower
6 Sheraton New Orleans
7 New Orleans Marriott
8 400 Poydras Tower
9 One Canal Place
10 1010 Common
11 Four Seasons Hotel and Private Residences New Orleans
12 Benson Tower
13 JW Marriott Hotel New Orleans
14 The Westin New Orleans Canal Place
15 225 Baronne Street
16 Hyatt Regency New Orleans
17 Entergy Tower
18 Hibernia Bank Building
19 1250 Poydras Plaza
20 Hilton New Orleans Riverside
21 1515 Poydras
22 The Odeon at South Market
23 National American Bank Building
24 Caesars New Orleans - Poydras Street Hotel
25 Pan American Life Center
26 1440 Canal
27 Poydras Center
28 Orleans Tower
29 Charity Hospital
30 Le Méridien New Orleans
31 Loews New Orleans Hotel
32 1615 Poydras
33 Four Winds
34 AT&T Building
35 1555 Poydras
36 Windsor Court Hotel
37 930 Poydras
38 Hilton Garden Inn New Orleans French Quarter/CBD
39 New Orleans Exchange Centre
40 New Orleans Marriott North
41 One River Place
42 Hilton New Orleans/St. Charles Avenue
43 The Jung Hotel & Residences
44 Renaissance Pere Marquette Hotel
45 Residence Inn by Marriott New Orleans French Quarter Area/Central Business District
46 Tulane University Murphy Building
47 Wyndham New Orleans - French Quarter
48 The Roosevelt New Orleans
49 925 Common Luxury Apartments
50 Marais Apartments
51 United States Postal Service Building
52 Hale Boggs Federal Building
53 The Troubadour Hotel New Orleans
54 The Ritz-Carlton, New Orleans
55 The Roosevelt New Orleans, Baronne Street Tower
56 Whitney Building
57 The Standard At South Market

== Cityscape ==
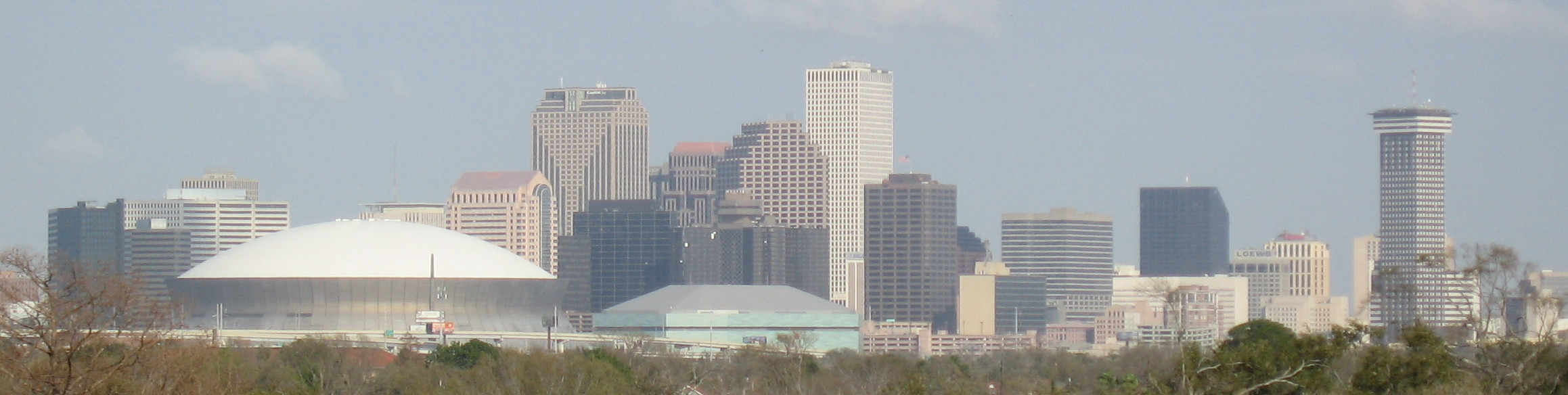
Skyline of New Orleans from Uptown in 2007

== Tallest buildings ==
There are 57 completed buildings in New Orleans that stand at least 200 ft (61 m) tall as of 2026, based on standard height measurement. This includes spires and architectural details but does not include antenna masts. The “Year” column indicates the year of completion. Buildings tied in height are sorted by year of completion with earlier buildings ranked first, and then alphabetically.

Was the tallest building in New Orleans upon completion

Rank	Name	Image	Location	Height ft (m)	Floors	Year	Purpose	Notes
1	Hancock Whitney Center		29°57′01″N 90°04′15″W	697 (212.5)	51	1972	Office	Has been the tallest building in New Orleans and Louisiana since 1972. Tallest building in the Southeastern United States at the time of its completion. First skyscraper in the Southeastern United States to rise higher than 656 feet (200 m); tallest building completed in the city in the 1970s. Formerly known as One Shell Square until 2018.
2	Place St. Charles		29°57′07″N 90°04′13″W	648 (197.6)	53	1985	Office	Has more floors than any other building in New Orleans. Tallest building completed in New Orleans in the 1980s. Formerly known as the Bank One Center and First NBC Center.
3	Plaza Tower		29°56′47″N 90°04′35″W	531 (161.9)	45	1968	Office	Tallest building in New Orleans from 1967 to 1972. Tallest building completed in the city in the 1960s. Plaza Tower has been unoccupied since 2002 due to the presence of toxic mold and asbestos in the building. Redevelopment plans have been put forward, but have not come to fruition as of 2026. Tallest unoccupied building in New Orleans.
4	Energy Centre		29°57′00″N 90°04′32″W	530 (161.6)	39	1984	Office	
5	BankPlus Tower		29°57′03″N 90°04′26″W	481 (146.6)	36	1987	Office	Formerly known as the First Bank and Trust Tower, LL&E Tower, and 909 Poydras Tower.
6	Sheraton New Orleans		29°57′07″N 90°04′06″W	479 (146)	47	1982	Hotel	Tallest building used exclusively as a hotel in New Orleans.
7	New Orleans Marriott		29°57′09″N 90°04′02″W	449 (137)	42	1972	Hotel	Tallest building on the downriver side of Canal Street.
8	400 Poydras Tower		29°56′54″N 90°04′05″W	442 (134.7)	32	1983	Office	Also known as the Texaco Center.
9	One Canal Place		29°57′05″N 90°03′56″W	440 (134)	32	1979	Office	The building contains The Shops at Canal Place and is attached to the Westin New Orleans Canal Place hotel, with which it shares a parking garage.
10	1010 Common		29°57′13″N 90°04′25″W	438 (133.5)	31	1970	Mixed-use	Constructed as an office building. In 2024, it was announced that 1010 Common will be redeveloped into a mixed-use hotel and office building, with the Fairmont New Orleans hotel occupying 18 floors.
11	Four Seasons Hotel and Private Residences New Orleans		29°56′56″N 90°03′49″W	407 (124.1)	33	1967	Mixed-use	Tallest building in New Orleans briefly from 1967 to 1968. Formerly known as the ITM Building and the World Trade Center New Orleans. Constructed as an office building. Closed in 2011 and was converted into a mixed-use hotel and residential building from 2018 to 2021.
12	Benson Tower		29°57′03″N 90°04′42″W	406 (123.8)	26	1989	Office	Formerly known as Dominion Tower and the CNG Tower.
13	JW Marriott Hotel New Orleans		29°57′08″N 90°04′09″W	386 (117.7) (Note: This figure is an estimate from Emporis.)	30	1984	Hotel	
14	The Westin New Orleans Canal Place		29°57′05″N 90°03′53″W	373 (113.7)	29	1983	Hotel	
15	225 Baronne Street		29°57′10″N 90°04′21″W	362 (110.3)	29	1965	Mixed-use	Tallest building in New Orleans from 1965 to 1967. Constructed as an office building. The building was converted to a mixed-use residential and hotel building between 2013 and 2015.
16	Hyatt Regency New Orleans		29°56′59″N 90°04′39″W	360 (110)	27	1976	Hotel	
17	Entergy Tower		29°56′56″N 90°04′37″W	360 (109.7)	28	1983	Office	
18	Hibernia Bank Building		29°57′06″N 90°04′18″W	355 (108.2)	20	1921	Office	Also known as Capitol One Bank Building. Tallest building completed in New Orleans in the 1920s.
19	1250 Poydras Plaza		29°57′02″N 90°04′37″W	342 (104.2)	24	1979	Mixed-use	Also known as Hyatt House New Orleans/Downtown. Formerly known as the Eni Building and the Mobil Building. Originall constructed as an office building, a portion of the building was converted into a Hyatt Hotel from 2014 to 2015.
20	Hilton New Orleans Riverside		29°56′50″N 90°03′49″W	341 (104)	29	1977	Hotel	
21	1515 Poydras		29°57′09″N 90°04′43″W	341 (104)	29	1984	Office	
22	The Odeon at South Market		29°56′53″N 90°04′34″W	341 (104)	29	2020	Residential	Tallest building completed in the city in the 2020s.
23	National American Bank Building		29°57′09″N 90°04′15″W	330 (100.6)	23	1929	Residential	Originally an office building, it was renovated for use as a residential building after Hurricane Katrina, work of which was finished in 2008. Also known by its street address, 200 Carondelet.
24	Caesars New Orleans - Poydras Street Hotel		29°56′52″N 90°03′56″W	327 (99.7)	26	2006	Hotel	Formerly Harrah's New Orleans. Tallest building completed in the city in the 2000s.
25	Pan American Life Center		29°56′59″N 90°04′11″W	322 (98)	28	1980	Office	
26	1440 Canal		29°57′25″N 90°04′32″W	312 (95.1)	24	1971	Office	
27	Poydras Center		29°56′56″N 90°04′12″W	299 (91)	28	1983	Office	
28	Orleans Tower		29°57′03″N 90°04′39″W	280 (85.3)	20	1977	Office	
29	Charity Hospital		29°57′19″N 90°04′41″W	279 (85)	20	1939	Health	Tallest building completed in the city in the 1930s; tallest hospital in New Orleans.
30	Le Méridien New Orleans		29°56′56″N 90°04′00″W	279 (85)	23	1984	Hotel	Formerly known as Holiday Inn Crowne Plaza, W New Orleans, and Four Points by Sheraton Downtown. Became the Le Méridien New Orleans in 2014.
31	Loews New Orleans Hotel		29°56′53″N 90°03′58″W	276 (84)	22	1972	Hotel	
32	1615 Poydras	—	29°57′10″N 90°04′48″W	276 (84)	23	1984	Office	Also known as DXC Technology Center. Formerly known as the Freeport McMoRan building.
N/A	Caesars Superdome		29°57′04″N 90°04′52″W	273 (83.2)	N/A	1972	Recreational	
33	Four Winds		29°57′10″N 90°04′18″W	271 (82.5)	19	1927	Residential	Constructed as an office building.
34	AT&T Building	—	29°56′59″N 90°04′23″W	265 (80.8)	16	1980	Data center	
35	1555 Poydras		29°57′10″N 90°04′45″W	260 (80)	22	1984	Office	
36	Windsor Court Hotel	—	29°56′58″N 90°03′59″W	253 (77)	22	1984	Hotel	
37	930 Poydras		29°57′00″N 90°04′27″W	242 (73.8)	21	2010	Residential	Tallest building completed in New Orleans in the 2010s.
38	Hilton Garden Inn New Orleans French Quarter/CBD	—	29°57′09″N 90°04′18″W	241 (73.5)	18	1956	Hotel	
39	New Orleans Exchange Centre		29°57′11″N 90°04′23″W	240 (73)	21	1981	Office	
40	New Orleans Marriott North	—	29°57′10″N 90°04′03″W	236 (71.9)	20	1979	Hotel	
41	One River Place	—	29°56′47″N 90°03′44″W	230 (70.1)	15	1995	Residential	
42	Hilton New Orleans/St. Charles Avenue		29°57′03″N 90°04′14″W	230 (70)	18	1926	Hotel	Originally a Masonic temple. Sold in 1992 and redeveloped as the Hotel Monaco until 2005. Reopened in 2007 as a Hilton.
43	The Jung Hotel & Residences	—	29°57′25″N 90°04′34″W	230 (70)	18	1928	Hotel	
44	Renaissance Pere Marquette Hotel	—	29°57′12″N 90°04′19″W	225 (68.6)	18	1925	Hotel	
45	Residence Inn by Marriott New Orleans French Quarter Area/Central Business District	—	29°57′03″N 90°04′12″W	217 (66.1)	19	2019	Hotel	
46	Tulane University Murphy Building	—	29°57′28″N 90°04′40″W	214 (65.2)	15	1983	Education	
47	Wyndham New Orleans - French Quarter	—	29°57′13″N 90°04′06″W	213 (65)	20	1969	Hotel	
48	The Roosevelt New Orleans		29°57′16″N 90°04′20″W	210 (64)	14	1907	Hotel	Tallest building in New Orleans from 1907 to 1921. Tallest building completed in New Orleans in the 1900s.
49	925 Common Luxury Apartments	—	29°57′14″N 90°04′22″W	210 (64)	14	1952	Residential	
50	Marais Apartments	—	29°57′28″N 90°04′31″W	210 (64)	17	1953	Residential	
51	United States Postal Service Building	—	29°56′54″N 90°04′37″W	210 (64)	14	1962	Office	
52	Hale Boggs Federal Building		29°56′54″N 90°04′07″W	210 (64)	14	1976	Office	
53	The Troubadour Hotel New Orleans	—	29°57′12″N 90°04′28″W	209 (63.7)	17	1967	Hotel	
54	The Ritz-Carlton, New Orleans	—	29°57′18″N 90°04′15″W	205 (62.5)	13	1909	Hotel	
55	The Roosevelt New Orleans, Baronne Street Tower	—	29°57′15″N 90°04′18″W	205 (62.5)	16	1925	Hotel	
56	Whitney Building	—	29°57′06″N 90°04′10″W	203 (61.9)	14	1911	Office	
57	The Standard At South Market	—	29°56′49″N 90°04′32″W	203 (61.9)	15	2018	Residential	

== Tallest demolished ==
There has been one building that once stood taller than 200 ft (61 m) in New Orleans and has since been demolished.

Name	Image	Height ft (m)	Floors	Year completed	Year demolished	Purpose	Notes
Grand Palace Hotel		203 (61.9)	17	1951	2012	Hotel	Originally constructed as the Claiborne Towers, a residential building. It was partially converted to a hotel in the 1960s, then a senior citizen's residence called Delta Towers in 1972. The building was fully converted into a hotel in the 1980s, and was known under various names before the Grand Palace Hotel. Damaged by Hurricane Katrina in 2005, the Grand Palace Hotel was demolished via implosion in 2012. The demolition took only 10 seconds to complete.

== Timeline of tallest buildings ==
Nine buildings once held the title of tallest building in New Orleans including the current titleholder, Hancock Whitney Center.

Name	Image	Street address	Years as tallest	Height ft (m)	Floors	Reference
Best Western St. Christopher Hotel	—	114 Magazine Street	1893–1895	117 (36)	8	
Hennen Building		203 Carondelet Street	1895–1904	158 (48)	11	
Hampton Inn New Orleans Downtown	—	226 Carondelet Street	1904–1907	190 (58)	14	
The Roosevelt New Orleans		123 Baronne Street	1907–1921	211 (64)	15	
Hibernia Bank Building		812 Gravier Street	1921–1965	355 (108)	20	
225 Baronne Street		225 Baronne Street	1965–1967	362 (110)	29	
World Trade Center New Orleans		2 Canal Street	1967–1969	407 (124)	33	
Plaza Tower		1001 Howard Avenue	1969–1972	531 (162)	45	
Hancock Whitney Center		701 Poydras Street	1972–present	697 (212)	51	

== Tallest buildings in Metarie ==
Metairie is an unincorporated area of Jefferson Parish, and considered a satellite city of New Orleans. It has over ten high-rise buildings, including five that are taller than 200 ft (61 m).

Rank	Name	Image	Location	Height ft (m)	Floors	Year	Purpose	Notes
1	Three Lakeway Center		30°01′06″N 90°09′20″W	403 (122.8)	34	1987	Mixed-use	Tallest building in Metairie and Jefferson Parish. Tallest building in Louisiana outside of New Orleans and Baton Rouge. Mixed-use office and hotel building.
2	The Galleria		29°59′44″N 90°09′08″W	269 (82)	21	1986	Office	
3	Two Lakeway Center	—	30°01′09″N 90°09′25″W	259 (78.9)	19	1996	Office	
4	Heritage Plaza		30°00′04″N 90°07′26″W	246 (75)	18	1983	Office	Tallest building in Metairie from 1983 to 1987.
5	Executive Tower One	—	30°00′45″N 90°09′24″W	203 (62)	14	1972	Office	Tallest building in Metairie from 1972 to 1983.

== See also ==
- Buildings and architecture of New Orleans
- List of tallest buildings in Louisiana
- List of tallest buildings in Shreveport
- List of tallest buildings in Baton Rouge
