= New Orleans Marriott =

Coordinates: 29.9526°N 90.0672°W

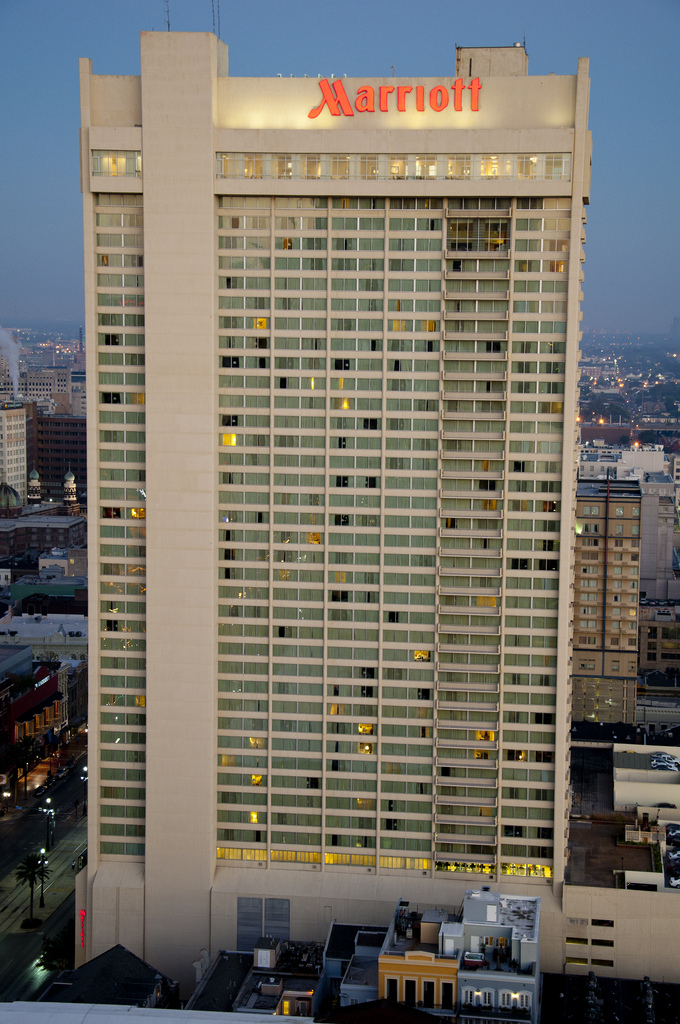
- New Orleans Marriott

General information
- Type: Hotel
- Location: 555 Canal Street; New Orleans, LA; United States
- Completed: 1972

Height
- Antenna spire: N/A
- Roof: 449 feet (137 m)

Technical details
- Floor count: 42

Design and construction
- Architect(s): Curtis and Davis

New Orleans Marriott, located at 555 Canal Street in the Central Business District of New Orleans, Louisiana, is a 42-story, 449 feet (137 m)-tall skyscraper. The Marriott is the seventh tallest building in New Orleans. Millionaire and convicted murderer Robert Durst had been staying at the hotel when he was arrested by FBI agents on March 14, 2015.

== See also ==
- List of tallest buildings in New Orleans
- List of tallest buildings in Louisiana
