= Le Méridien New Orleans =

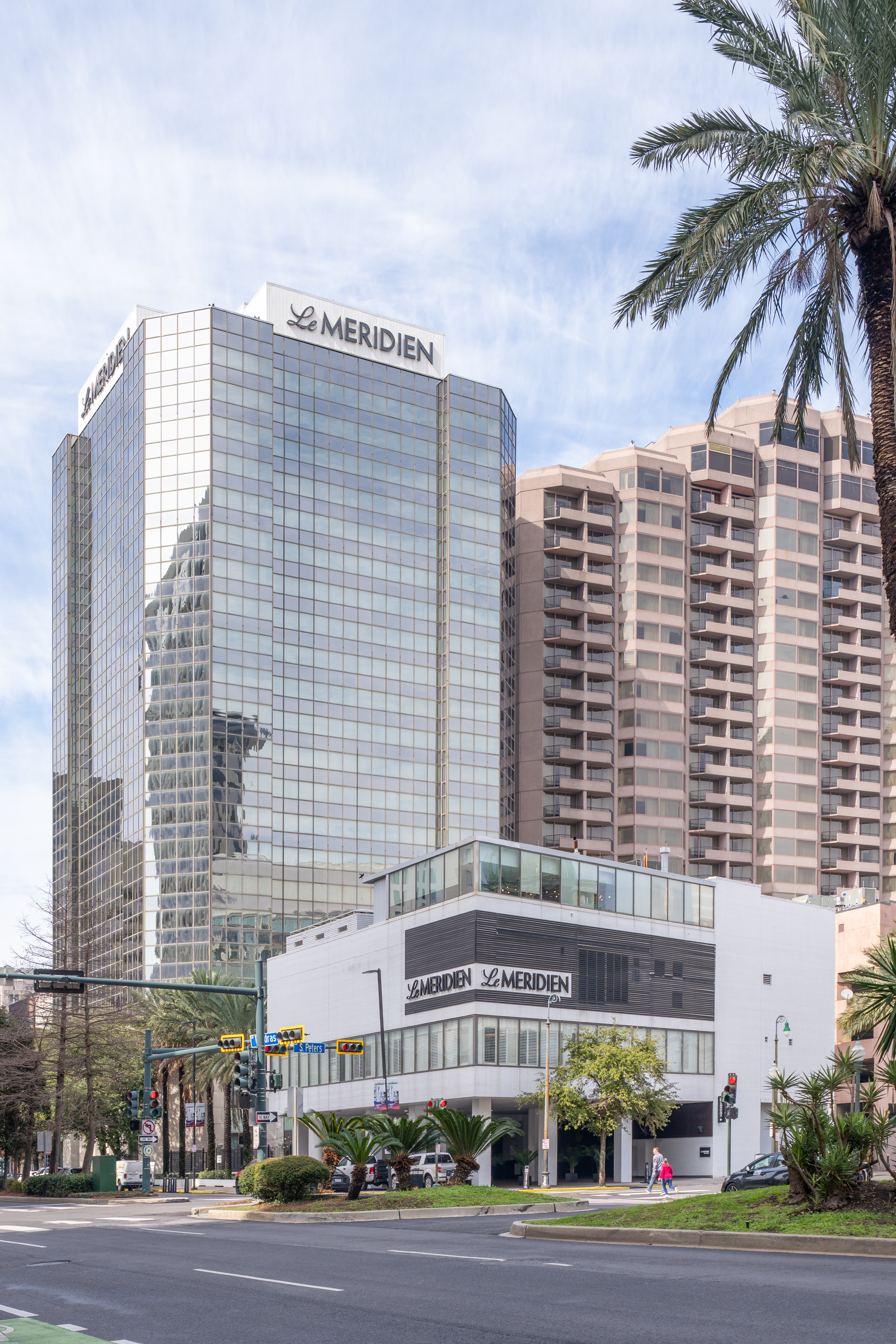
- (2026)
- Interactive map of the Le Méridien New Orleans area

General information
- Type: Hotel
- Location: 333 Poydras Street, New Orleans, Louisiana, United States
- Coordinates: 29.948863°N 90.066614°W
- Construction started: 1982
- Completed: 1984
- Opening: 1984
- Owner: Stonebridge Companies & Walton Street Capital

Height
- Roof: 279 ft (85 m)

Technical details
- Floor count: 23

Design and construction
- Architects: DMJM, Eskew + Architects

Le Méridien New Orleans is a 23-story high-rise building in the Central Business District of New Orleans, Louisiana. The building rises 279 feet (85 m), and is currently tied with Charity Hospital as the 29th-tallest building in the city. It also stands as the 8th-tallest hotel in New Orleans.

The hotel was designed with a modern architecture style by architectural firm DMJM and was opened in 1984 as the Holiday Inn Crowne Plaza to accommodate crowds attending the 1984 Louisiana World Exposition. It became the Four Points by Sheraton Downtown in the late 1990s and then the W New Orleans Hotel in 2000.

The hotel was significantly damaged by Hurricane Katrina in 2005. Half of the hotel's rooms had their windows blown out.

In April 2013 it was sold to Chesapeake Lodging Trust for $65 million. On July 15, 2014, the hotel was given the temporary name Hotel New Orleans Downtown while it underwent a $29 million renovation. It became the Le Méridien New Orleans on December 15, 2014. In 2019, Park Hotels & Resorts, which had acquired Chesapeake Lodging Trust, sold the hotel to Stonebridge Companies and Walton Street Capital for $84 million.

The building houses a 4-star Le Méridien with 423 guest rooms.

== See also ==
- List of tallest buildings in New Orleans
- Buildings and architecture of New Orleans
