= Energy Centre =

General information
- Type: Office, Retail
- Location: New Orleans, Louisiana, United States
- Coordinates: 29°57′01″N 90°04′32″W
- Completed: 1984

Height
- Roof: 530 feet (162 m)

Technical details
- Floor count: 39
- Floor area: 761,500 square feet (70,746 m^{2})

Design and construction
- Architect: HKS, Inc.
- Structural engineer: HKS, Inc.

Website
- https://energycentre.us/

The Energy Centre, located in the Central Business District of New Orleans, Louisiana, is a 39-story, 530 feet (162 m) -tall skyscraper designed by HKS, Inc. It is the fourth tallest building in both the city of New Orleans and the state of Louisiana.

== Location ==
The Energy Centre has an official address of 1100 Poydras Street, New Orleans, LA 70163, but there is no entrance on Poydras and the main public entrances are in the 500-block of Loyola Avenue. It occupies the block bounded by Poydras, Loyola, South Rampart Street, and Lafayette St. (the last of which is pedestrian-only in this block).

The building annex is an additional, four-storey parking garage adjacent to the tower, in the next block upriver, just across Lafayette Street. The annex garage is accessible from both Loyola Avenue and South Rampart Street.

== History ==
In November 2003, the building was acquired by Behringer Harvard (TIER REIT) for $68.5 million.

The building experienced minor damage during Hurricane Katrina in August 2005. Some windows near the top of the tower were blown out, however, these windows were mostly false windows that cover the climate control systems on the roof. The ceilings of the overhangs on the street level were badly damaged. Repairs on the building was completed in 2010.

In August 2013, New Orleans CityBusiness reported that Hertz, a California based company, and unnamed local investors were in the process of buying the Energy Centre, which expected to close in September that year. In July 2014, Jacksonville Daily Record reported that the tower had been purchased by Hertz.

In March 2024, NOLA.com reported that the tower became delinquent after Hertz unable to pay its $56.5 million mortgage in October 2023. The building was then foreclosed in August 2024 and bought by the New York based Triangle Capital Group in November 2024.

== See also ==
- List of tallest buildings in New Orleans
- List of tallest buildings in Louisiana
