= Walton Street Capital =

Real estate firm based in Chicago, USA

Walton Street Capital, L.L.C.
- Type: Private company
- Industry: Private Equity Real Estate
- Founded: 1994; 32 years ago
- Headquarters: Chicago, Illinois, United States
- AUM: US$15 billion (June 2022)
- Website: waltonst.com

Walton Street Capital, L.L.C. ("Walton Street" or the "Firm") is an American private real estate investment firm founded in 1994 and headquartered in Chicago. The Firm manages diversified equity and debt platforms on behalf of its global institutional clients. Through the cross platform synergies of its investment groups, Walton Street seeks to make real estate equity and debt investments with attractive risk adjusted returns.

As of 2026, through its affiliates, Walton Street Capital has raised over $17 billion of equity and loan commitments from global institutional investors and has acquired, financed, managed and sold more than $60 billion of investments in real estate and real estate operating companies.
