= Hilton New Orleans/St. Charles Avenue =

American hotel skyscraper

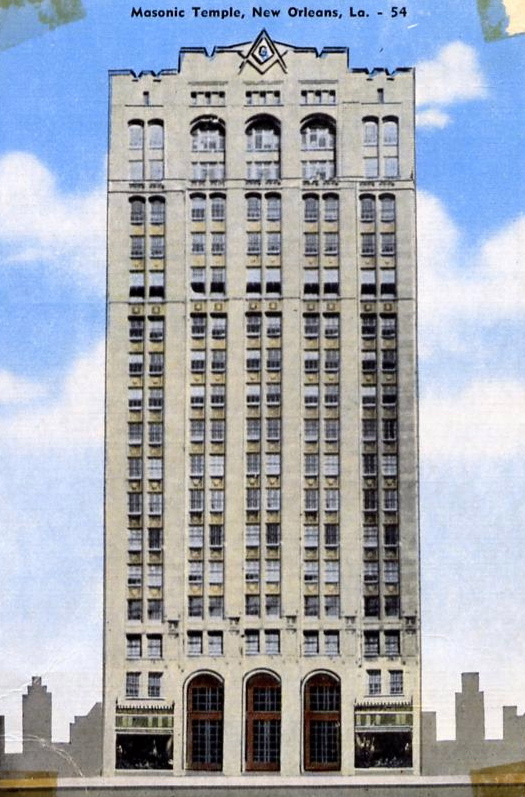
- View of the building when it was the new Masonic Temple

General information
- Type: Hotel
- Location: 333 St. Charles Avenue; New Orleans, LA; United States
- Coordinates: 29.950624°N 90.070381°W
- Completed: 1926

Height
- Antenna spire: N/A
- Roof: 246 feet (75 m)

Technical details
- Floor count: 20

Hilton New Orleans/St. Charles Avenue, located at 333 St. Charles Avenue in the Central Business District of New Orleans, Louisiana, USA, is a 20-story, 246 feet (75 m)-tall skyscraper and part of the Hilton Hotels chain. The building was originally the Masonic Temple, but was sold in 1992 and redeveloped as Hotel Monaco until Hurricane Katrina in 2005. It did not reopen after Katrina. The hotel reopened in 2007 as a Hilton. Hilton New Orleans/St. Charles Avenue was also inducted into Historic Hotels of America, the official program of the National Trust for Historic Preservation, in 2015.

== See also ==
- List of tallest buildings in New Orleans
