= 1515 Poydras =

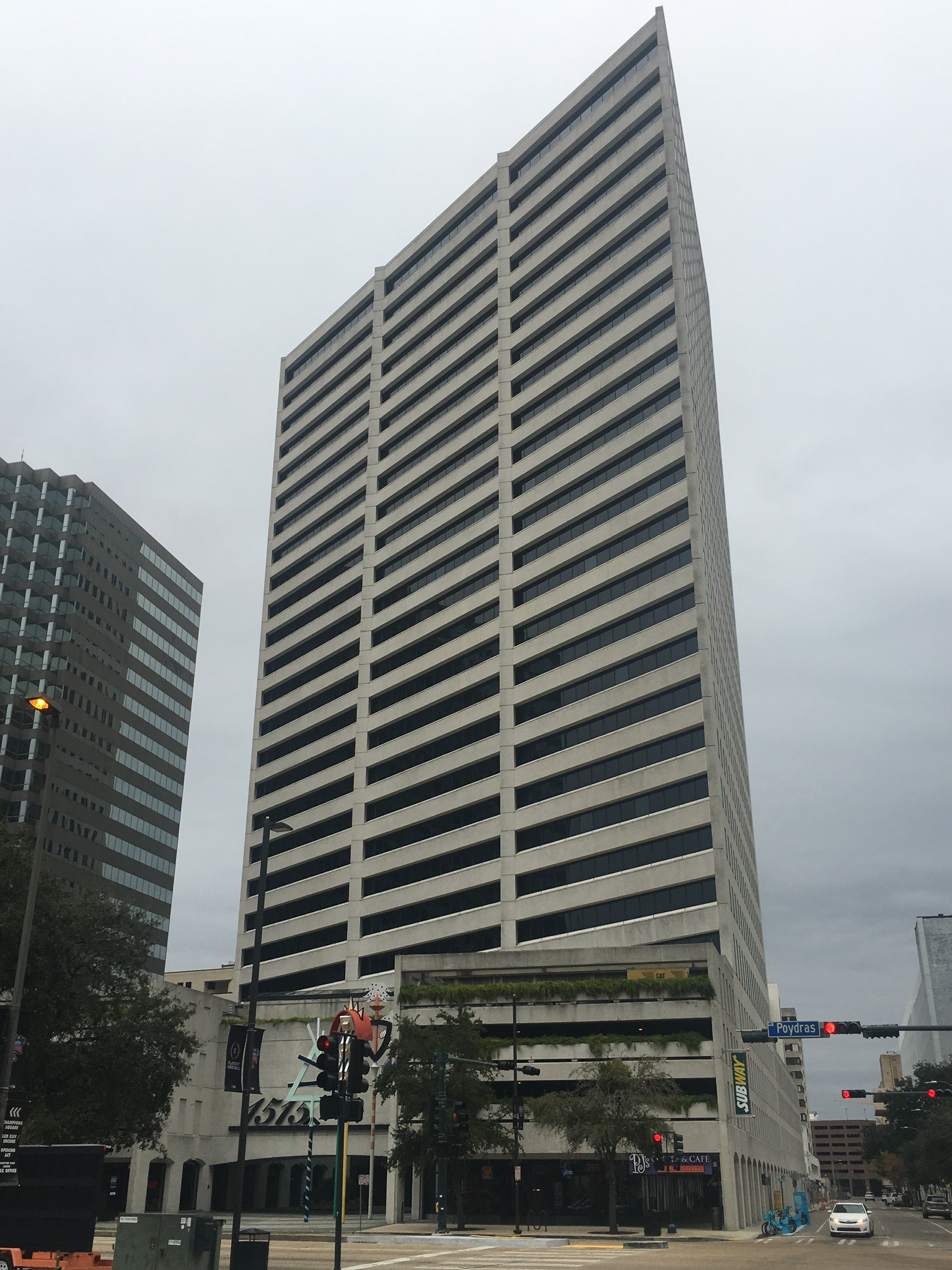

General information
- Type: Office
- Location: 1515 Poydras Street; New Orleans, LA; United States
- Coordinates: 29.952106°N 90.078634°W
- Completed: 1984

Height
- Antenna spire: N/A
- Roof: 341 feet (104 m)

Technical details
- Floor count: 27
- Floor area: Office: 529,474 square feet (49,190 m²)

Design and construction
- Architect(s): Skidmore, Owings & Merrill

1515 Poydras (formerly the Gulf Building), located at 1515 Poydras Street in the Central Business District of New Orleans, Louisiana, is a 29-story, 341-foot (104 m)-tall skyscraper.

== See also ==
- List of tallest buildings in New Orleans
