= Postlethwaite & Netterville =

American accounting company

Postlethwaite & Netterville (P&N)
- Industry: Accounting
- Founded: 1949
- Products: Professional services
- Number of employees: 400+ (as of June 2020)
- Website: http://www.pncpa.com

Postlethwaite & Netterville (P&N) is an American accounting company based in Baton Rouge, Louisiana. Founded in 1949, it is the largest Louisiana-based accounting and business advisory firm, with over 400 employees. Its headquarters is in Baton Rouge, with other offices in Donaldsonville, Gonzales, Lafayette, Metairie, New Orleans, St. Francisville and Houston.

The firm was founded in 1949 by Alexander Postlethwaite, a native of Natchez, Mississippi, who formed Postlethwaite & Lee with F. Cayce Lee. The firm became Postlethwaite, Netterville, Evans & Major in the mid-1960s before shortening its name soon after. By 2000, P&N had 17 partners and 165 employees.

In 2022, the company merged with RBM and absorbed more than 20 employees, expanding into the Shreveport market.
