= Three Lakeway Center =

Skyscraper in Metairie, Louisiana

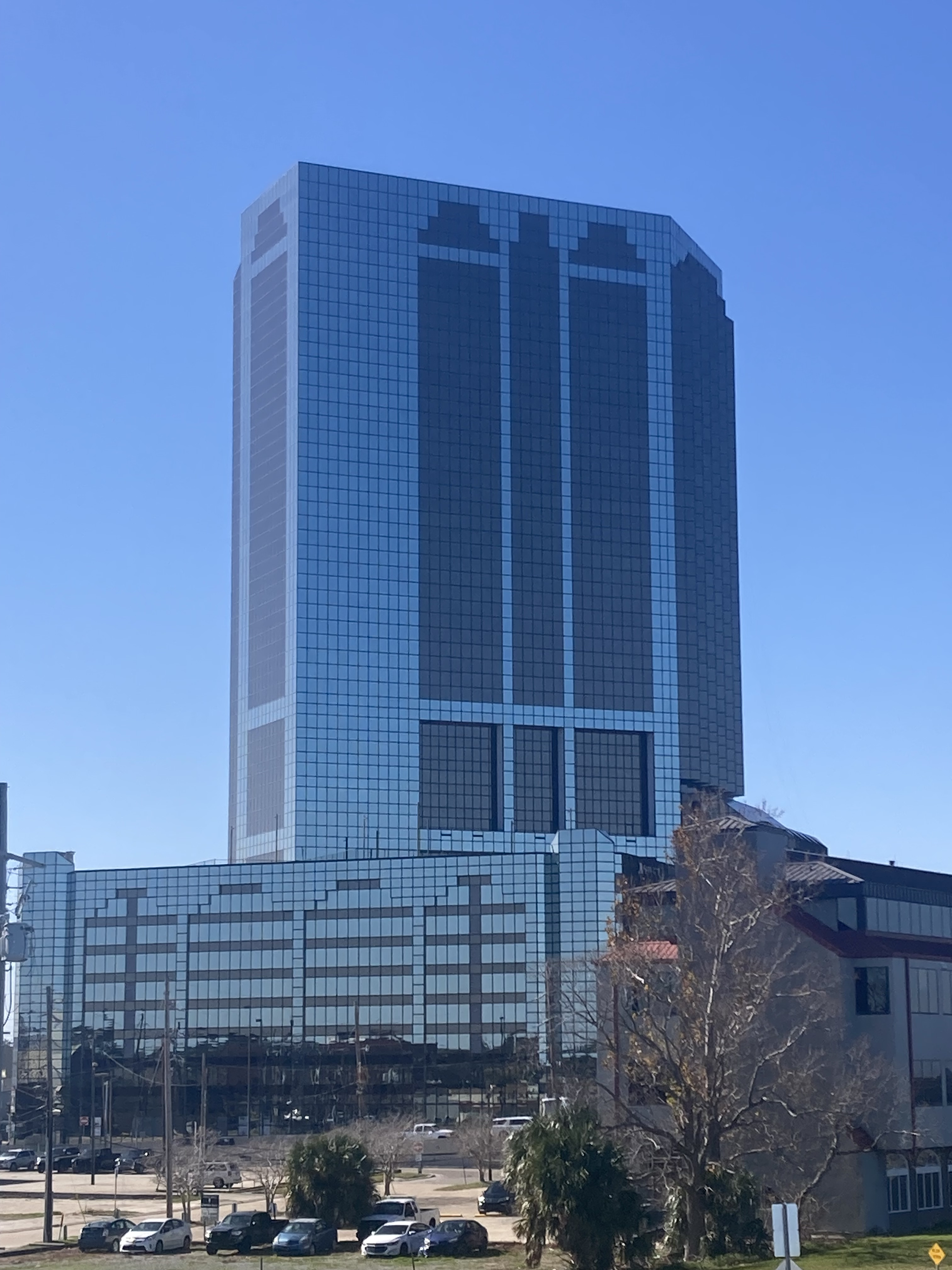

General information
- Type: Office/Hotel
- Location: Metairie, LA; United States
- Coordinates: 30°1′6″N 90°9′18″W
- Completed: 1987
- Cost: $46,700,000

Height
- Roof: 403 feet (123 m)

Technical details
- Floor count: 34

Three Lakeway Center, in Metairie, Louisiana, United States, is a 34-story, 403-foot (123 m)-tall skyscraper. It is the tallest building in Jefferson Parish, Louisiana and is the 13th tallest building in the Greater New Orleans area. It is also one of the tallest buildings in the unincorporated areas of the United States.

== Location ==
3838 North Causeway Boulevard, Metairie, LA

== See also ==
- List of tallest buildings in New Orleans
- List of tallest buildings in Metairie
