= 1615 Poydras =

General information
- Type: Office
- Location: 1615 Poydras Street; New Orleans, LA; United States
- Coordinates: 29.952649°N 90.07982°W
- Completed: 1984

Height
- Antenna spire: N/A
- Roof: 276 feet (84 m)

Technical details
- Floor count: 23
- Floor area: Office: 508,741 sq ft (47,263.6 m^{2})

Design and construction
- Architect(s): Hellmuth, Obata & Kassabaum

1615 Poydras, also known as DXC Technology Center, and formerly known as the Freeport McMoRan building, is a 23-story, 276-foot (84 m)-tall skyscraper office building. It is located at 1615 Poydras Street, in the Central Business District of New Orleans, Louisiana.

== See also ==
- List of tallest buildings in New Orleans
- Freeport-McMoRan
