= 225 Baronne Street =

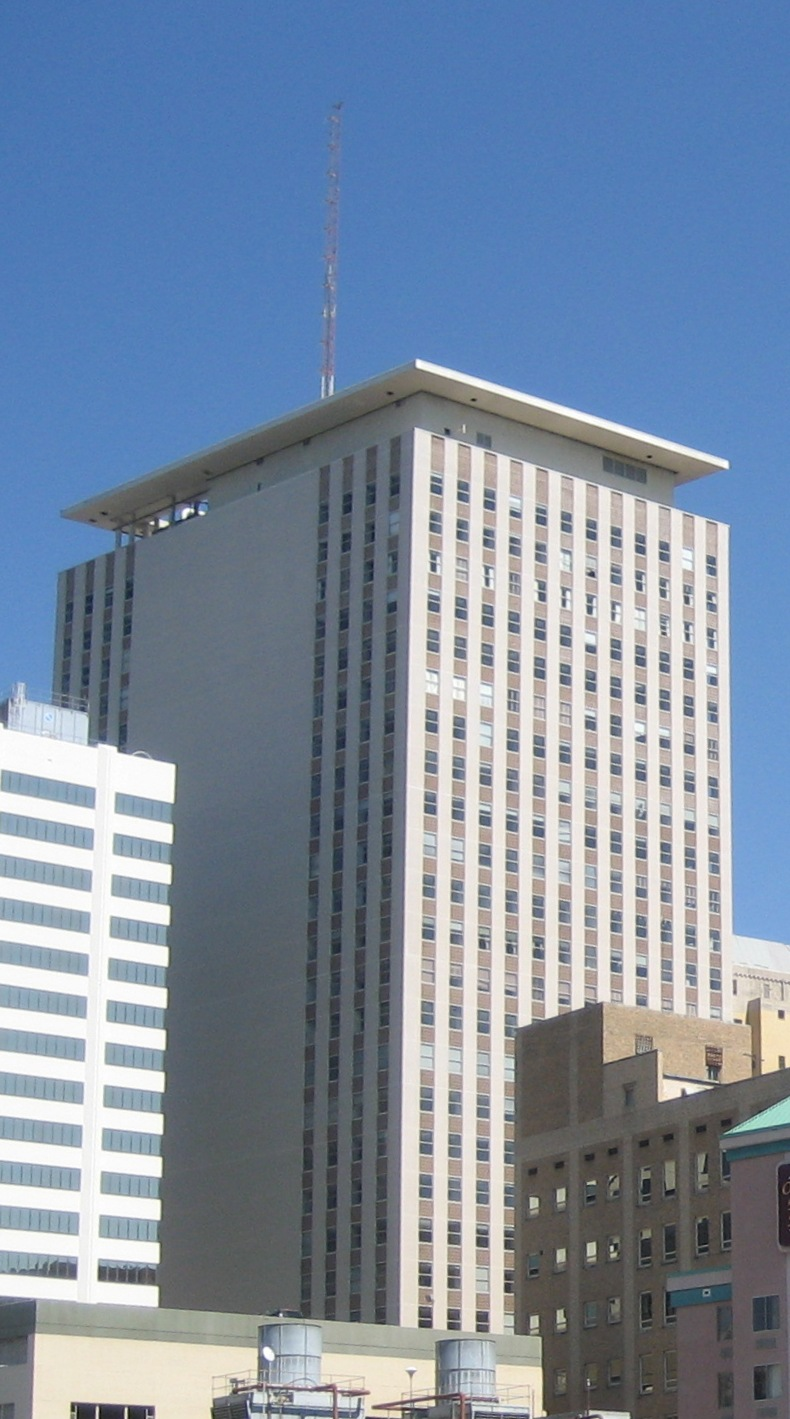

General information
- Type: Hotel & Residential
- Location: 225 Baronne Street; New Orleans, LA; United States
- Coordinates: 29.952684°N 90.072405°W
- Completed: 1962

Height
- Antenna spire: N/A
- Roof: 362 feet (110 m)

Technical details
- Floor count: 30
- Floor area: 422,037 square feet (39,209 m^{2})

Design and construction
- Architect: Shaw, Metz and Associates

225 Baronne Street, located at 225 Baronne Street in the Central Business District of New Orleans, Louisiana, is a 30-story, 362 feet (110 m)-tall skyscraper.

Between 2013 and 2015 the building underwent a $100 million renovation to convert the former office building into a 188-room Aloft Hotel and 192 residential apartments. The bottom 10 floors were also converted into a 356 space parking garage.

== History ==
The building originally served as the local headquarters for Boeing when it opened its doors in 1962. It was the tallest building in New Orleans from 1965 to 1967.

== See also ==
- List of tallest buildings in New Orleans
