= 1440 Canal =

- Interactive map of the 1440 Canal area

General information
- Type: Office
- Location: New Orleans, United States
- Coordinates: 29.957099°N 90.075288°W
- Completed: 1971

Height
- Antenna spire: unknown
- Roof: 288 feet (88 m)
- Top floor: 288 feet (88 m)

Technical details
- Floor count: 24 [26 actually]
- Lifts/elevators: 10 total: 6 (G to 24), 3 (G to 12) 1 (24 to 25)

Design and construction
- Architect: Kessels-Diboll-Kessels

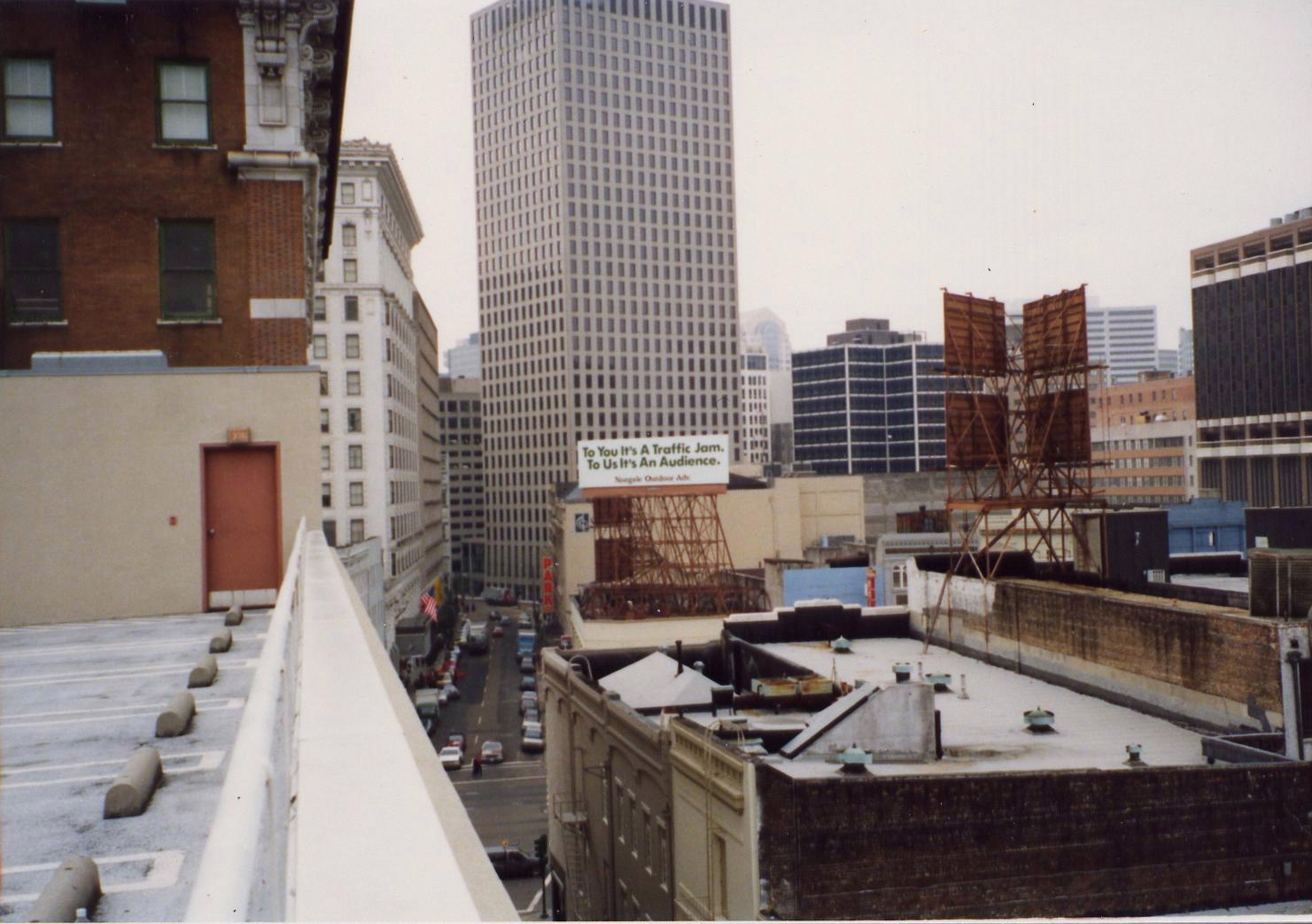
View of the Tidewater Building in 1990

The 1440 Canal, also formerly known as the Tidewater Building and Tidewater Place, located at 1440 Canal Street in the Medical District of the Central Business District of New Orleans, Louisiana, is officially a 24-story, 288 feet (88 m)-tall high-rise building designed by Kessels-Diboll-Kessels. The building has lesser-known 25th and 26th floors that are accessible only from the 24th floor and are much smaller in area than the other floors.

It originally was built as the corporate office for Tidewater Marine in 1971. Tidewater Inc. donated the building to Tulane University in 1993. The building is the home to the Tulane University School of Public Health and Tropical Medicine. A few other Tulane offices are housed there as well. Tulane replaced all external signage which read "Tidewater" with signs that read "Tulane University School of Public Health and Tropical Medicine."

WWOZ, radio station 90.7 FM in New Orleans, has its antenna and transmitter atop the building.

As a result of the deluge from the levees breaking during Hurricane Katrina in August 2005, the building suffered from approximately four feet of floodwaters on the ground floor. Repopulation of the building began in November 2005. The building reopened in January 2006.

== Location ==
1440 Canal Street
New Orleans, LA 70112

The building is located at the corner of Canal Street and LaSalle Street.

Zone: Medical District
Neighborhood: Central Business District
District: French Quarter/CBD

== See also ==
- List of tallest buildings in New Orleans
- Tulane University School of Public Health & Tropical Medicine
