= Hibernia Bank Building (New Orleans) =

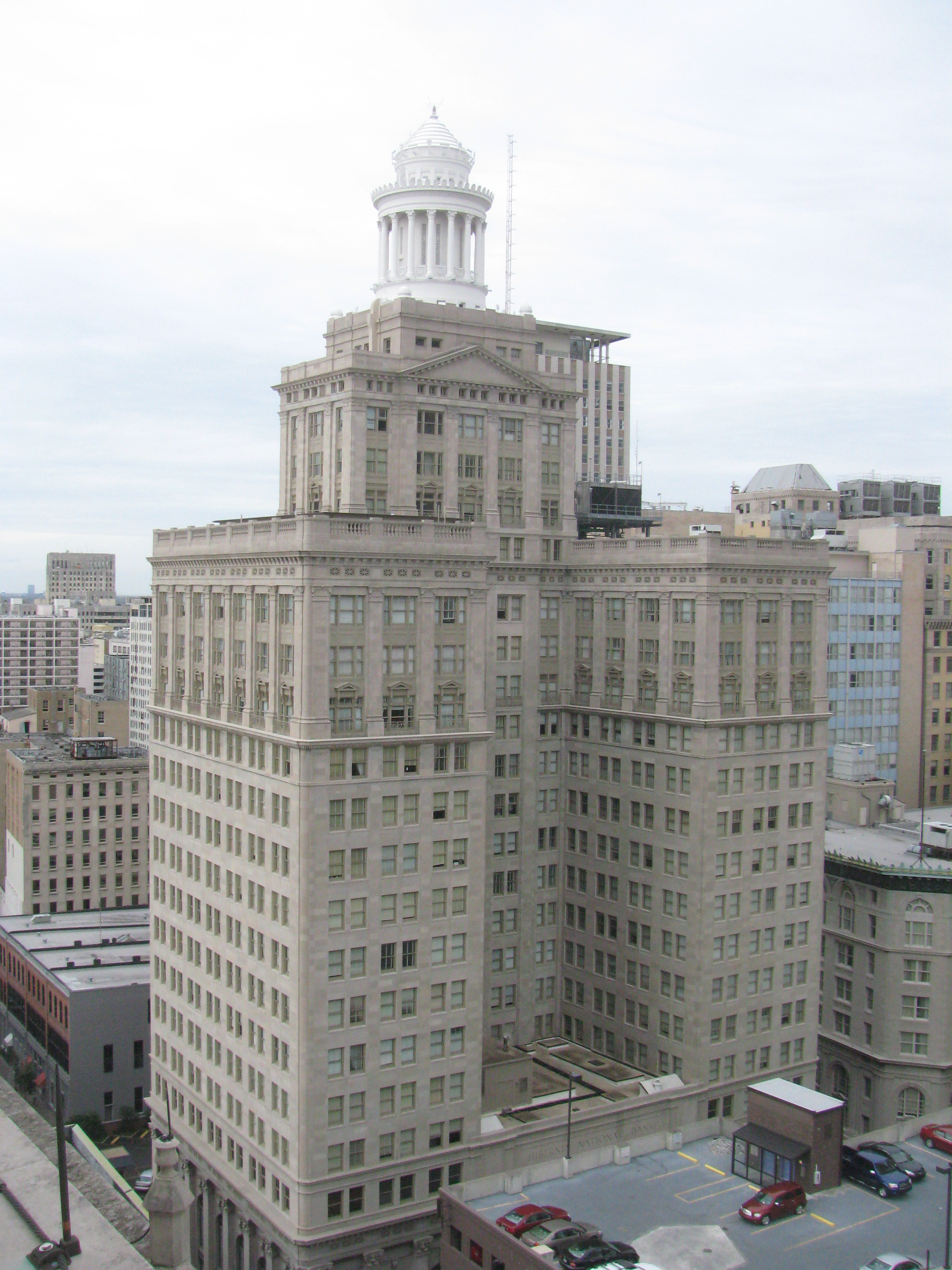
- (2008)

General information
- Type: Office
- Location: 812 Gravier Street; New Orleans, Louisiana
- Coordinates: 29.951653°N 90.071435°W
- Completed: 1921

Height
- Antenna spire: N/A
- Roof: 355 feet (108 m)

Technical details
- Floor count: 23

Design and construction
- Architect(s): Favrot and Livaudais (original)

Hibernia Bank Building, at 812 Gravier Street at the corner of Carondelet Street in the Central Business District of New Orleans, Louisiana, is a 23-story, 355 feet (108 m)-tall skyscraper. It was once the headquarters of Hibernia National Bank. At the time it was completed in 1921, it was the tallest building in Louisiana. In 1932, the state capitol took that title.

In 2006, Hibernia Bank began to vacate the building and move its offices to Place St. Charles. Only the retail bank in the lobby remained in service. 313 Carondelet, a joint venture of Historic Restoration Inc. and Woodward Interest LLC is converting the building into 176 mixed-income apartments and two floors of offices.

The white tower atop the building remains a familiar part of the skyline, and during holidays is lit up with colored lights—red and green for Christmas and purple, green, and gold for New Orleans Mardi Gras. It once served as a navigational beacon for ships on the Mississippi River.

== See also ==
- List of tallest buildings in New Orleans
- List of tallest buildings in Louisiana
- Hibernia Bank Building (San Francisco), built in 1892 as headquarters for the unrelated Hibernia Savings and Loan Society, later the Hibernia Bank
