= Four Winds (New Orleans) =

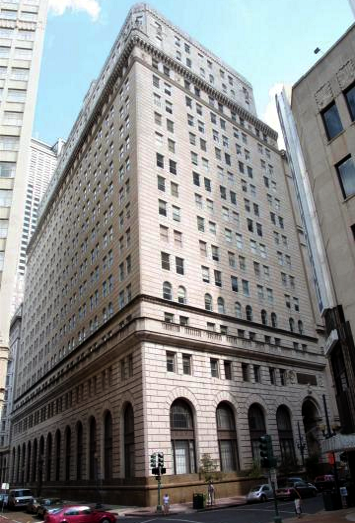
- Interactive map of the Four Winds area

General information
- Type: Residential / Commercial
- Location: 210 Baronne St, New Orleans, Louisiana, United States
- Coordinates: 29.952871°N 90.071797°W
- Completed: 1927
- Opening: 1927

Height
- Roof: 270 ft (82 m)

Technical details
- Floor count: 19

Design and construction
- Architect: Emile Weil
- Developer: Kailas Companies

The Four Winds is a combination commercial and luxury apartment building in the Central Business District of New Orleans, Louisiana, developed by Kailas Companies. The building is 252-foot (77 m) high, and has nineteen floors.

It was designed by Emile Weil, completed in 1927 and housed the Canal Bank and Trust. It was then occupied by the First National Bank of Commerce for almost 90 years, until the bank collapsed in 2017.

In 2015, after significant renovations, the building was reopened with its original facade to match Emile Weil's original stylings. The Four Winds currently stands as the 34th-tallest building in the city.

== See also ==
- List of tallest buildings in New Orleans
- Buildings and architecture of New Orleans
