= Four Seasons Hotel and Private Residences New Orleans =

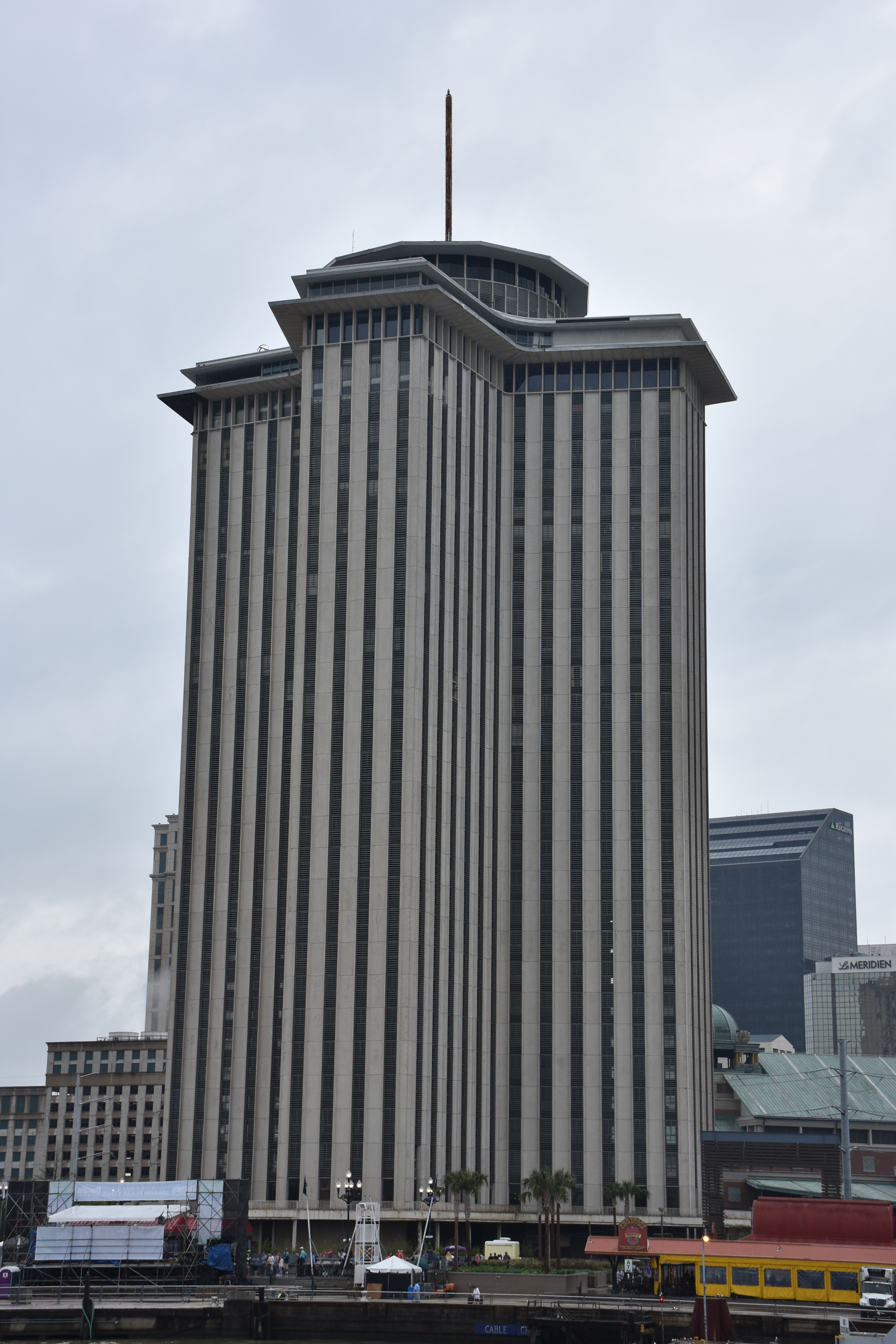
- The vacant structure, seen from the Mississippi River, 2015
- Interactive map of Four Seasons Hotel and Private Residences New Orleans

General information
- Type: Hotel/condominium
- Location: 2 Canal Street; New Orleans, Louisiana
- Coordinates: 29.948976°N 90.063355°W
- Completed: 1967

Height
- Antenna spire: N/A
- Roof: 407 feet (124 m)

Technical details
- Floor count: 34
- Lifts/elevators: 12

Design and construction
- Architect: Edward Durell Stone

The Four Seasons Hotel and Private Residences New Orleans is a historic 33-story, 407 feet (124 m)-tall skyscraper designed by noted architect Edward Durell Stone, located at 2 Canal Street in the Central Business District of New Orleans. It was formerly known as the "ITM Building", i.e., the International Trade Mart, it was also known as the World Trade Center New Orleans, and housed numerous foreign consulates and the headquarters for the Port of New Orleans.

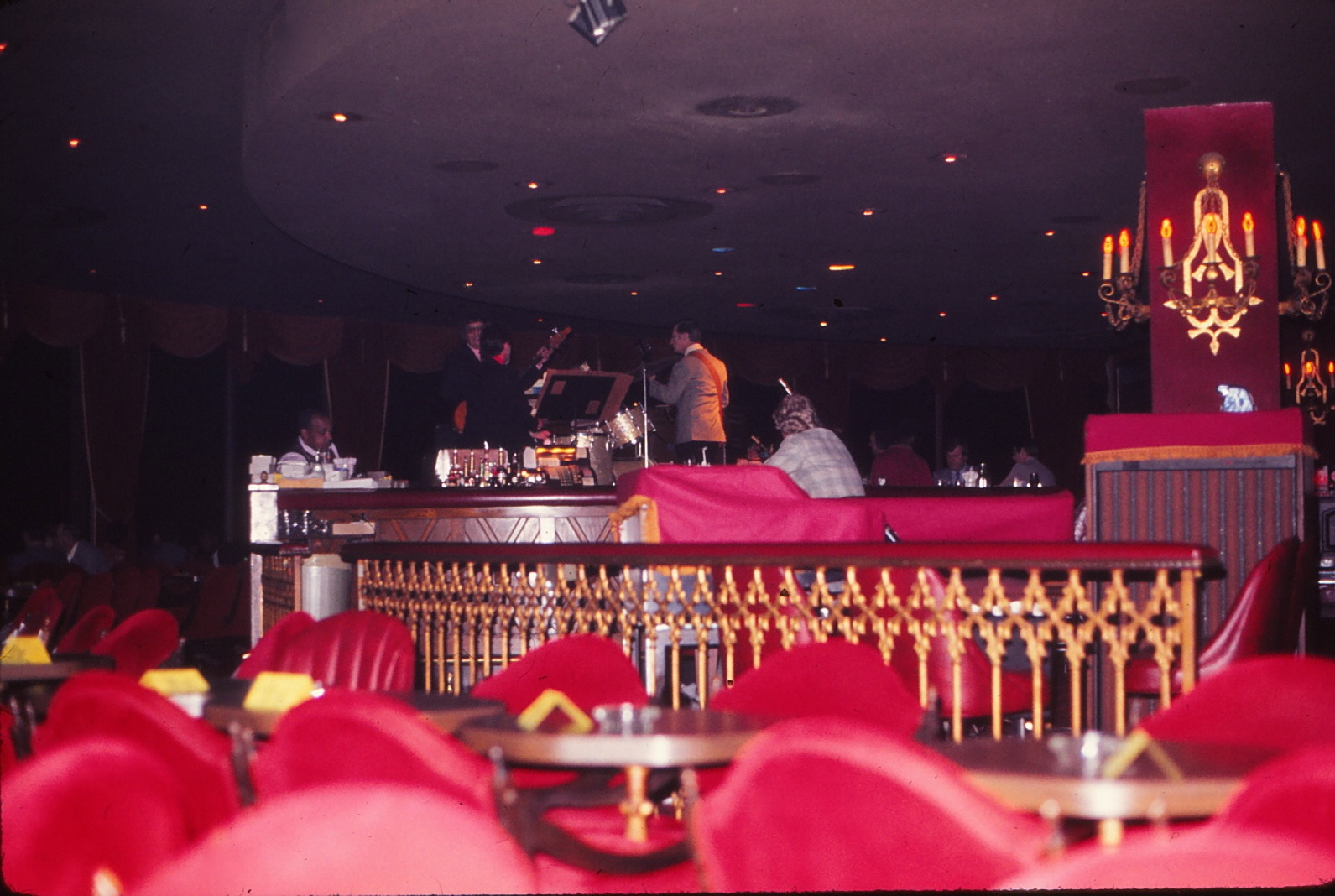
"Top of the Mart" in 1973

The top floor hosted a cocktail lounge called "Top of the Mart" from the 1970s through 2001. The bar slowly rotated once per hour. After this, a bar called "360" (as in degrees) opened in its place, which remained until Hurricane Katrina in 2005. The World Trade Center closed in June 2011 and the building was purchased by the city of New Orleans.

In the years following the closure, various plans emerged. The “Save WTC NOLA” group campaigned for renovation rather than demolition, while others campaigned to have the building demolished and have a park and landmark to the city built in its place.

The building was added to the National Register of Historic Places on June 9, 2014.

In 2018, work began to convert the structure to a Four Seasons Hotel, with 341 hotel rooms and 92 hotel-serviced condos on the top floors of the building. The conversion cost $450 million. In January 2021, its penthouse was sold for just under $13 million. The hotel opened on August 17, 2021.

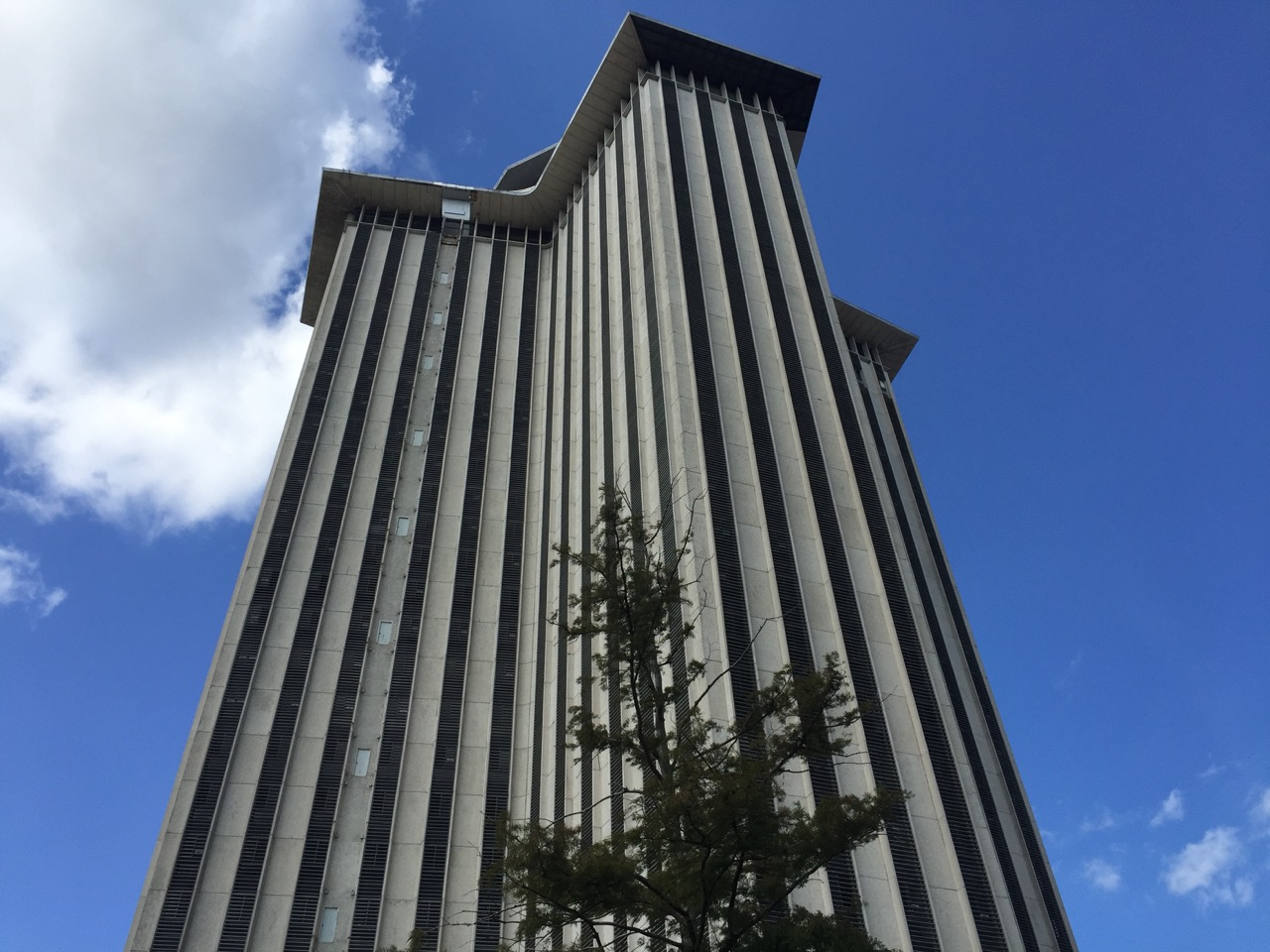
The then-WTC Building New Orleans in 2016.

== See also ==
- List of tallest buildings in New Orleans
- Hotel Monteleone, which has a rotating bar
