= JW Marriott Hotel New Orleans =

JW Marriott New Orleans
- Interactive map of the JW Marriott New Orleans area

General information
- Type: Hotel
- Location: 614 Canal Street, New Orleans, Louisiana, United States
- Coordinates: 29.952668°N 90.068707°W
- Completed: 1984
- Opening: 1984

Height
- Roof: 331 ft (101 m)

Design and construction
- Architects: August Perez & Associates

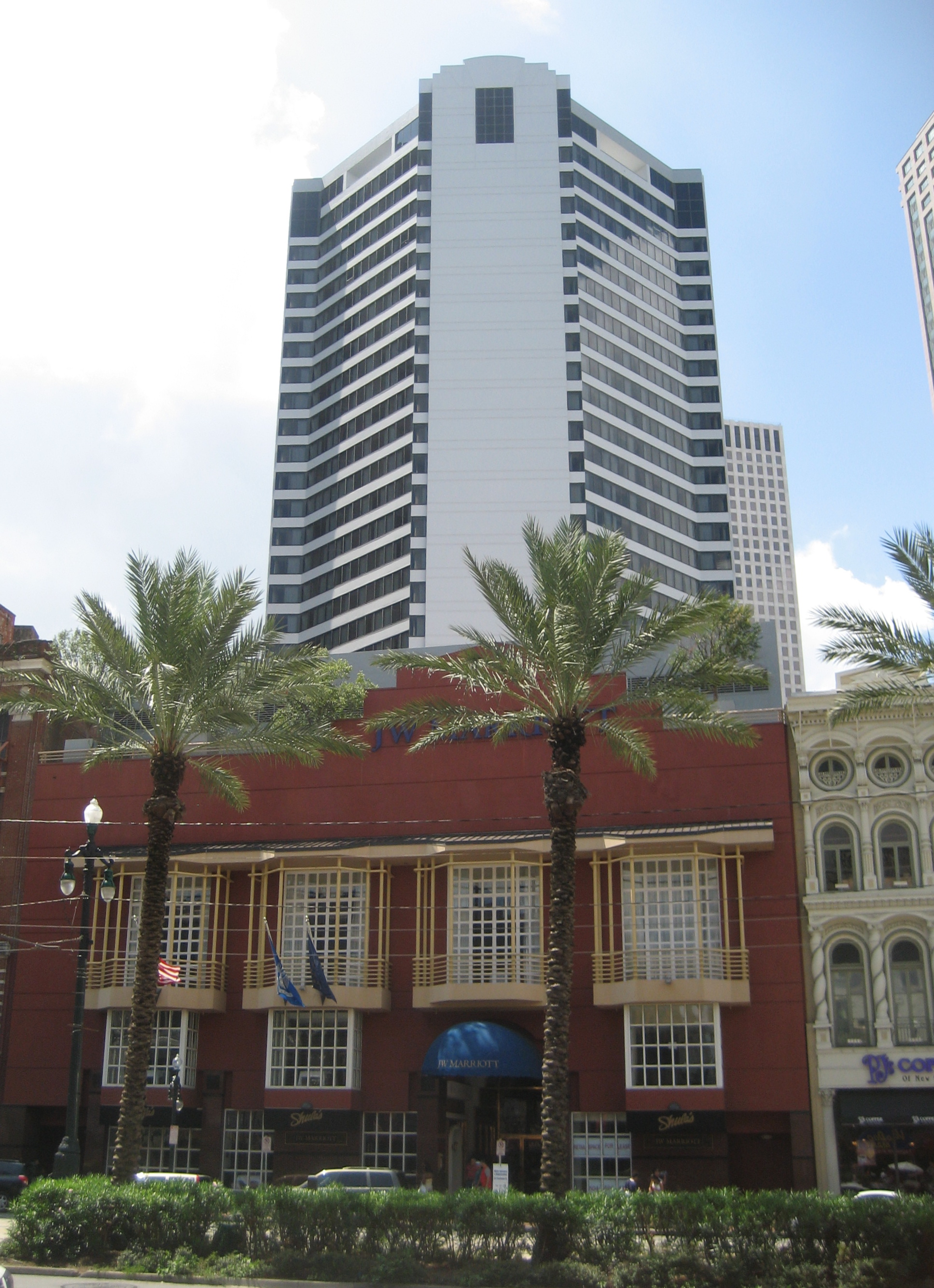
Entrance to the JW Marriott on Canal Street.

The JW Marriott New Orleans is a 331 feet (101 m), modern 30-story high-rise hotel in the Central Business District of New Orleans, Louisiana. The 4-star, 501-room hotel currently stands as the 13th-tallest building in the city, and the 3rd-tallest hotel.

== History ==
The Hotel Meridien New Orleans was designed by August Perez & Associates and opened in 1984 to accommodate crowds attending the 1984 Louisiana World Exposition. Its name was later changed slightly to Le Meridien New Orleans. In 2002 the hotel's owners, La Salle Hotel Properties, concluded a lengthy legal battle with the Le Meridien management company. La Salle first announced their intention to convert the hotel to The Westin New Orleans, but instead they signed Interstate Hotels & Resorts to manage the property, and it was renamed without a brand in December 2002 as the New Orleans Grande Hotel. Four months later, in April 2003, La Salle sold the hotel for $92.5 million to CNL Hospitality Properties. The new owners contracted Marriott to manage the hotel and renamed it the JW Marriott New Orleans in June, 2003.

The hotel suffered some flooding during Hurricane Katrina in August 2005. It was evacuated on late August 28, and the flooding included some water filling the basement and part of the first floor. The hotel also lost electricity, much like the other buildings in Downtown New Orleans, although it had generators that remained operational after the city lost power. Despite this, the generators began running out of fuel, and the hotels lost air conditioning, but there was still enough energy to use lights.

== See also ==
- List of tallest buildings in New Orleans
- Buildings and architecture of New Orleans
