= 1555 Poydras =

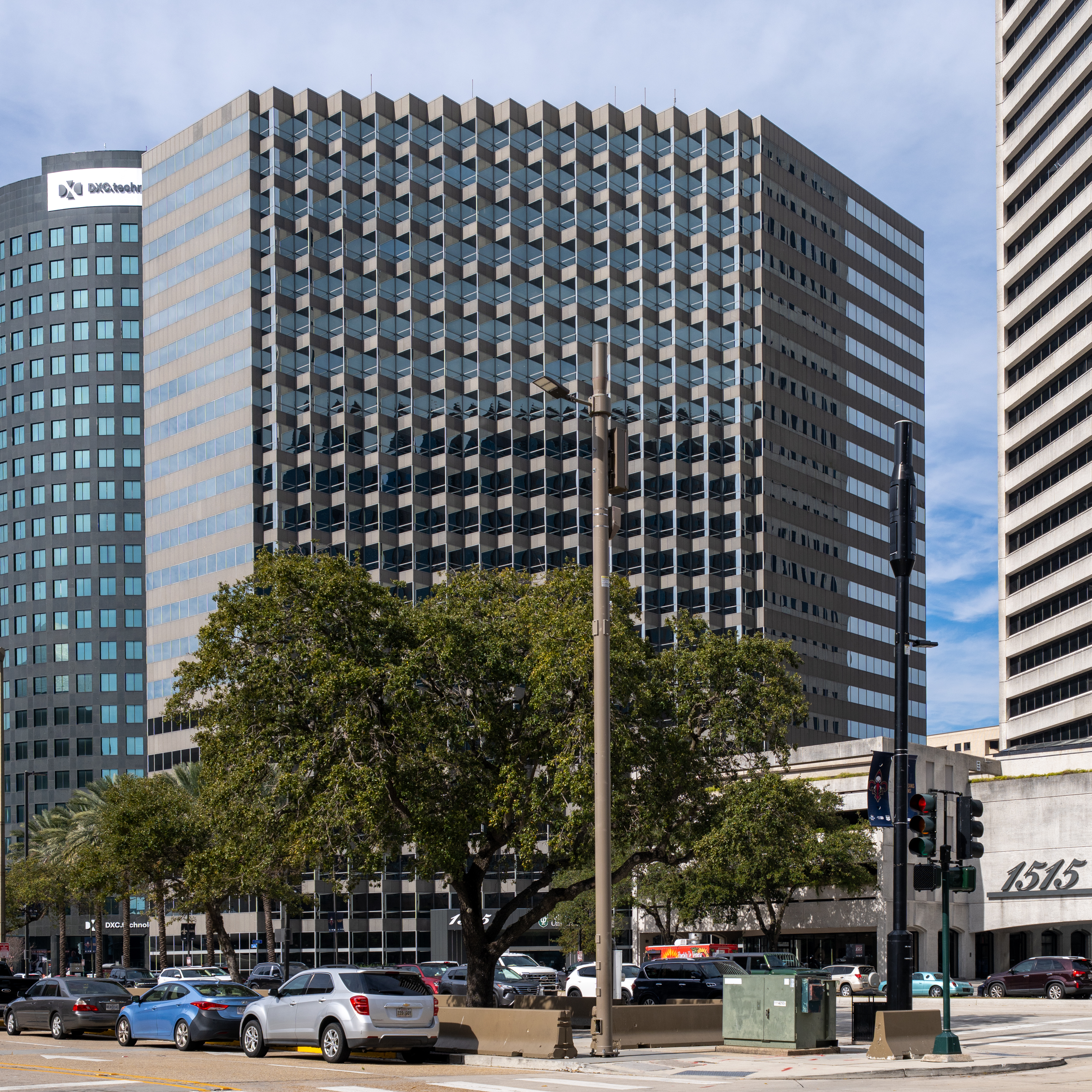
- Interactive map of the 1555 Poydras area

General information
- Status: Completed
- Type: Office
- Location: 1555 Poydras Street; New Orleans, LA; United States
- Coordinates: 29.952483°N 90.079184°W
- Completed: 1984

Height
- Roof: 262 feet (80 m)

Technical details
- Floor count: 22
- Floor area: Office: 467,671 square feet (43,448 m^{2})

Design and construction
- Architect: Hebeisen Associates

1555 Poydras (formerly the Exxon Building), is a high-rise office building located at 1555 Poydras Street in the Central Business District of New Orleans, Louisiana. It has 22 stories, and stands at a height of 262 feet (80 m).

== Occupants ==
The main occupant of the property is the Tulane University School of Medicine. The school has secured the leases to several of the upper floors, and is expected to occupy the majority of these in the coming years. Following Hurricane Katrina, the school has sublet several of these floors to businesses displaced by the storm. On August 26, 2007, a sign saying "Tulane University Health Sciences Center School of Medicine" was installed over the front entrance way.

The school has fully occupied the 10th and 22nd floors, which house the School's Administration and Standardized Patient facilities, respectively. In December 2008, work was completed on the ground floor auditorium. However, most lectures had shifted in 2009 to the recently donated Murphy Building nearby.

== See also ==
- List of tallest buildings in New Orleans
