= Orleans Tower =

Orleans Tower (formerly Amoco Building)
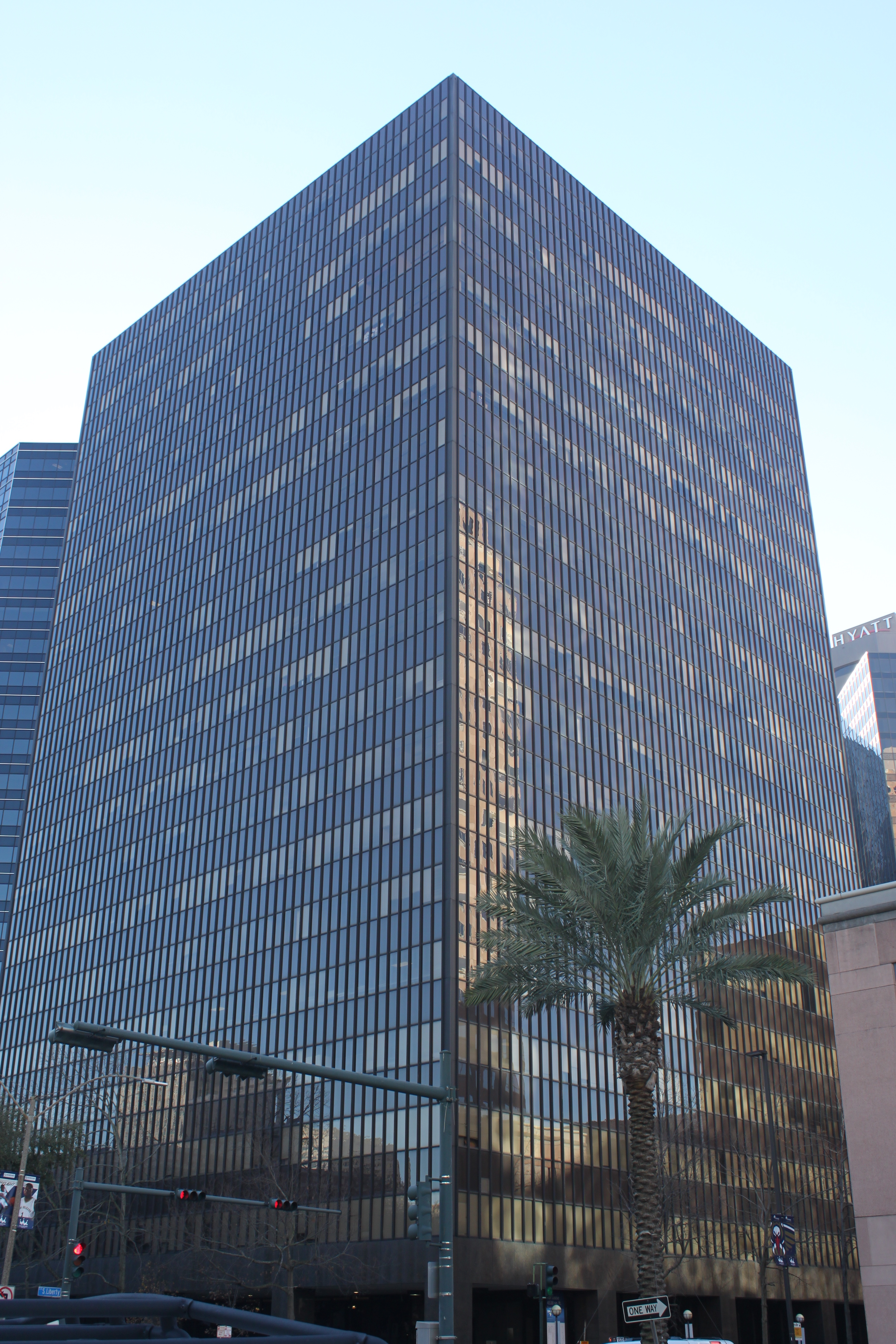

General information
- Type: Office
- Location: 1340 Poydras Street; New Orleans, LA 70112; United States
- Coordinates: 29°57′3.29″N 90°04′38.83″W
- Completed: 1977

Height
- Antenna spire: N/A
- Roof: 280 ft (85 m)
- Top floor: 280 ft (85 m)

Technical details
- Floor count: 20
- Floor area: Office: 378,895 sq ft (35,200.5 m^{2})
- Lifts/elevators: 10

Design and construction
- Architect: 3D/International

Orleans Tower (formerly Amoco Building), located at 1340 Poydras Street in the Central Business District of New Orleans, Louisiana, United States, is a 20-story, 280 feet (85 m)-tall skyscraper designed in the international style by 3D/International. The international style grew in popularity during the sixties and seventies after the architect Mies Van Der Rohe designed the Seagram Building on Park Ave in New York City and Skidmore, Owings, and Merrill designed the Sears Tower in the heart of downtown Chicago. The building is primarily used for leaseable office space, with some retail space on the ground level. The design of the building can be best classified as international with its black aluminum and glass curtain wall. The building currently houses the offices of several city and state agencies, including the Orleans Parish District Attorney's Office. Orleans Tower is currently the 28th tallest building in New Orleans.

== See also ==
- List of tallest buildings in New Orleans
