= 1250 Poydras Plaza =

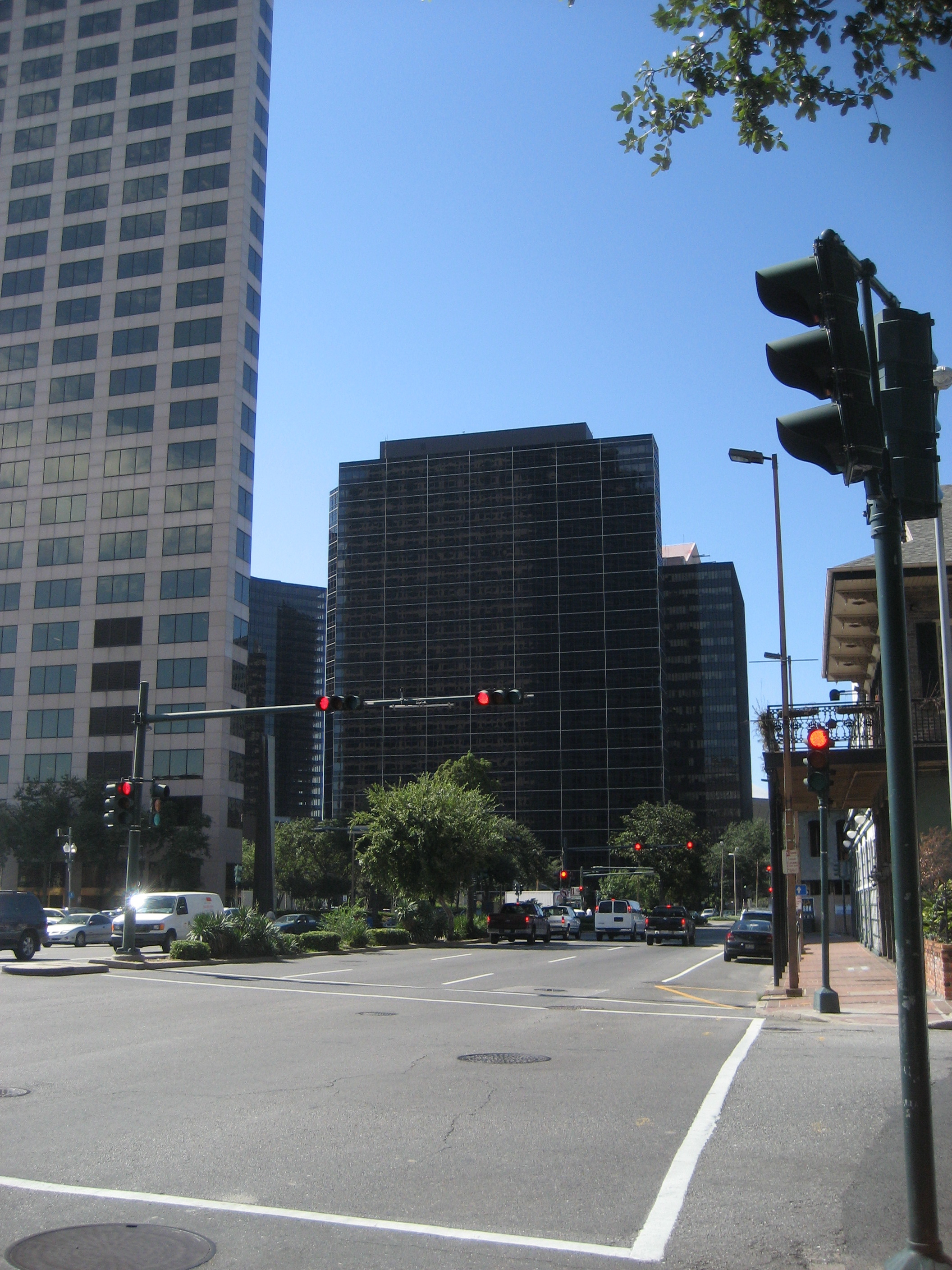
- Interactive map of the 1250 Poydras Plaza area

General information
- Type: Office
- Location: 1250 Poydras Street; New Orleans, LA; United States
- Coordinates: 29.950696°N 90.077409°W
- Completed: 1979

Height
- Antenna spire: N/A
- Roof: 342 ft (104 m)

Technical details
- Floor count: 24

Design and construction
- Architect: 3/D International

1250 Poydras Plaza (also known as the Eni Building and formerly the Mobil Building), is a high-rise international-style office building located at 1250 Poydras Street in the Central Business District of New Orleans, Louisiana. It has 24 stories, and stands at a height of 342 feet (104 m).

In June 2010, the Unified Command moved its headquarters from the Dutch Royal Shell Conference Center in Robert, Louisiana, to the building to deal with the Deepwater Horizon oil spill.

== See also ==
- List of tallest buildings in New Orleans
