= List of tallest buildings in Jackson =

Tallest buildings in Jackson, MS

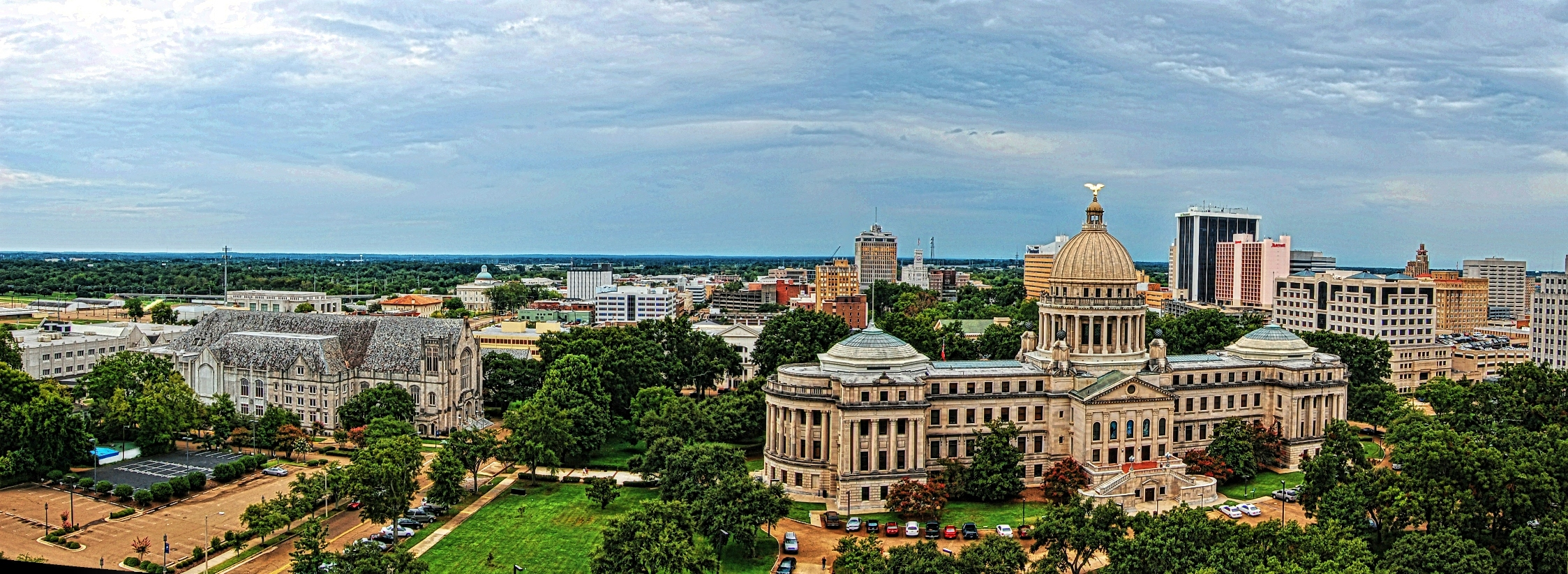
Jackson skyline

The table below shows the eighteen tallest buildings in Jackson, Mississippi, United States.

The city has the third-tallest building in the state of Mississippi, Regions Plaza, at 318 feet (97 m). The two tallest buildings in the state are the 348-foot-tall (106 m) Beau Rivage Hotel and the 335-foot-tall (102 m) IP Casino Hotel, both located in Biloxi.

See: List of tallest buildings in Mississippi.

== Tallest buildings ==
Rank	Name	Image	Height ft (m)	Floors	Year	Notes
1	Regions Plaza		318 (97)	22	1975	Tallest building in Jackson since its completion in 1975.
2	Jackson Marriott Downtown		255 (78)	21	1975	
3	Regions Bank Building		254 (77)	18	1929	Tallest building in Jackson from 1929 to 1975.
4	Walter Sillers State Office Building		250 (76)	20	1972	
5	Standard Life Building		250 (76)	22	1929	Renovated and converted into residential and retail in 2010.
6	Capital Towers Building		245 (74)	20	1965	
7	Trustmark National Bank Building		215 (66)	14	1955	
8	Lamar Life Building		191 (58)	10	1924	Tallest building in Jackson from 1924 to 1929.
9	Dr. A. H. McCoy Federal Building	-	189 (58)	15	1979	Renovated in 2013.
10	Mississippi State Capitol		180 (55)	4	1903	Tallest building in Jackson from 1903 to 1924.
11	St. Dominic's Ambulatory Surgery Center	-	176 (54)	14	1973	Tallest building outside of Downtown Jackson.
12	Hilton Hotel Jackson	-	176 (54)	14	1985	Second-tallest building outside of Downtown Jackson.
13	One Jackson Place		176 (54)	14	1987	
14	Woolfolk State Office Building		169 (52)	16	1949	
15	King Edward Hotel (Jackson, Mississippi)		156 (48)	12	1923	Renovated and converted into hotel, residential, and retail in 2009.
16	The Pinnacle at Jackson Place	-	144 (44)	9	2008	
17	City Centre South	-	143 (44)	12	1958	Renovated in 1987.
18	Electric 308	-	126 (38)	10	1927	Renovated and converted into residential and office in 2005.

== See also ==
- List of tallest buildings in Mobile
- List of tallest buildings in Jacksonville
- Tallest skyscrapers in Jackson
- Capital Towers
