= Comstock Hotel & Casino =

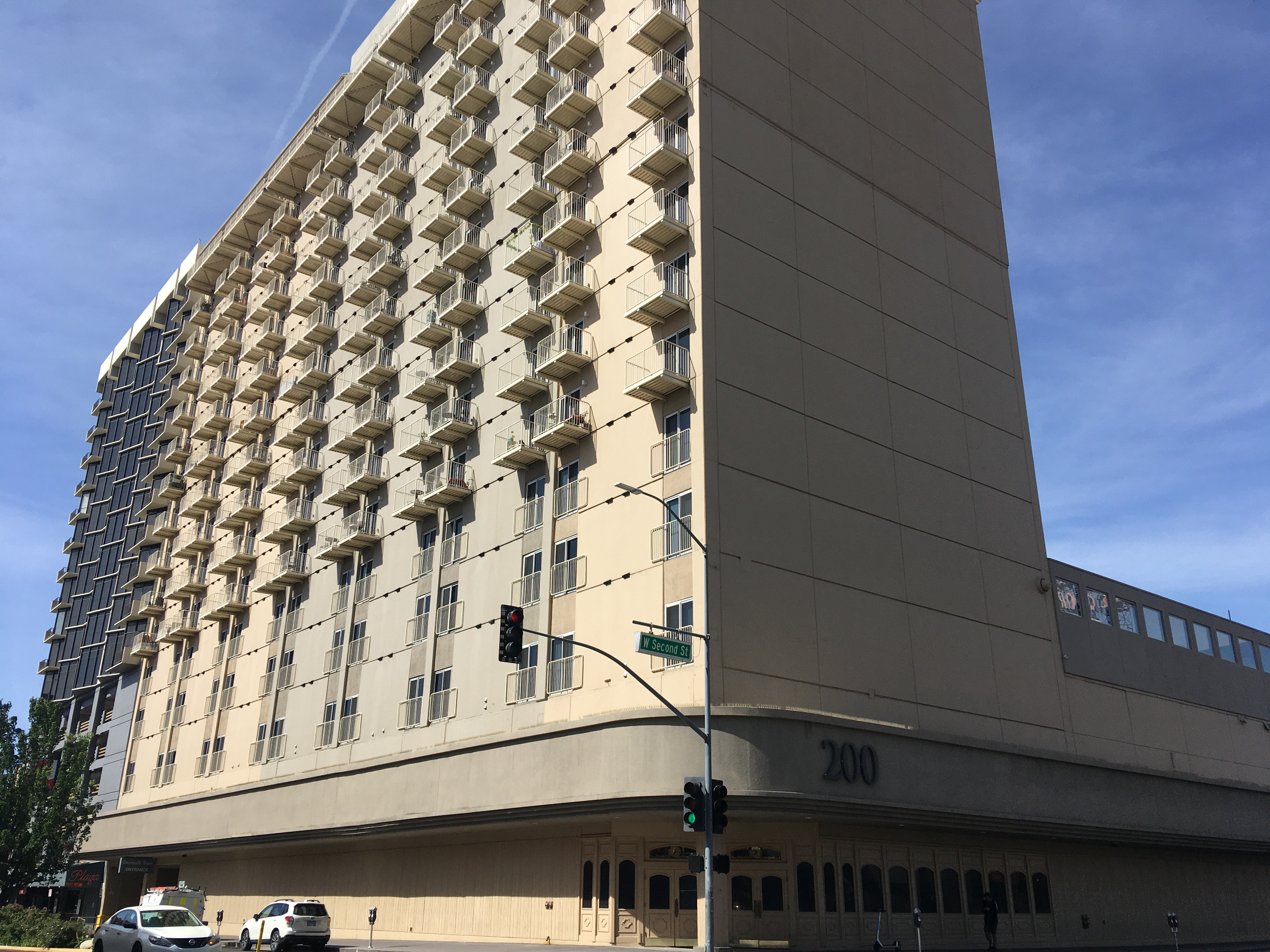
- Interactive map of Comstock Hotel & Casino
- Location: 200 West Second Street, Reno, Nevada; 39.526084°N 119.816065°W
- Opened: 1978
- No. of rooms: 160
- Casino type: Land-based

The Comstock Hotel & Casino is a former hotel and casino in Reno, Nevada, USA. The building is now home to the Residences at Riverwalk Towers.

== History ==
The construction of the hotel and casino began in 1977, and it was completed in May 1978. It was designed in the modernist architectural style. It contained 160 hotel rooms and 325 slot machines.

The initial investors were the Fiesta Corporation (Jack Douglass, Cal Kinney, Jr., Leon Nightingale, John Douglass, Warren Nelson, William Thornton, Howard Farris, Ad Tolen, Greg Nelson, Steven Nightingale), who owned 47%, and the Comstock Land and Development Company, who owned another 47%, as well as several other investors. The first manager was John Douglass.

The hotel was acquired by Judah Hertz, the founder of the Hertz Investment Group, in 1999, but he sold it in 2000 after he was denied a license by the Nevada Gaming Commission.

The building is now home to the Residences at Riverwalk Towers.
