= Regions Bank building =

Regions Bank building can refer to a number of buildings currently, formerly, or unofficially named for Regions Bank:

- 100 North Tampa, previously the Regions Building, in Tampa, Florida
- Regions Bank Building (Mobile) in Mobile, Alabama
- Regions Center (Birmingham) in Birmingham, Alabama. Corporate Headquarters
- Regions Center (Little Rock) in Little Rock, Arkansas
- Regions-Harbert Plaza in Birmingham, Alabama
- Regions Plaza (Atlanta, Georgia)
- Regions Plaza (Jackson, Mississippi)
- Regions Tower in Shreveport, Louisiana.
- Regions Tower in Indianapolis, Indiana
- One Nashville Place in Nashville, Tennessee
- Regions Bank Building (Jackson, Mississippi) in Jackson, Mississippi.
- Regions 615 in Charlotte, North Carolina
- Regions Bank Building in Orlando, Florida
