= Regions Plaza =

Regions Plaza may refer to:

- Regions Plaza (Atlanta, Georgia)
- Regions Plaza (Jackson, Mississippi)
