= Governor of Mississippi =

Head of government in Mississippi, US

- Seal of Mississippi

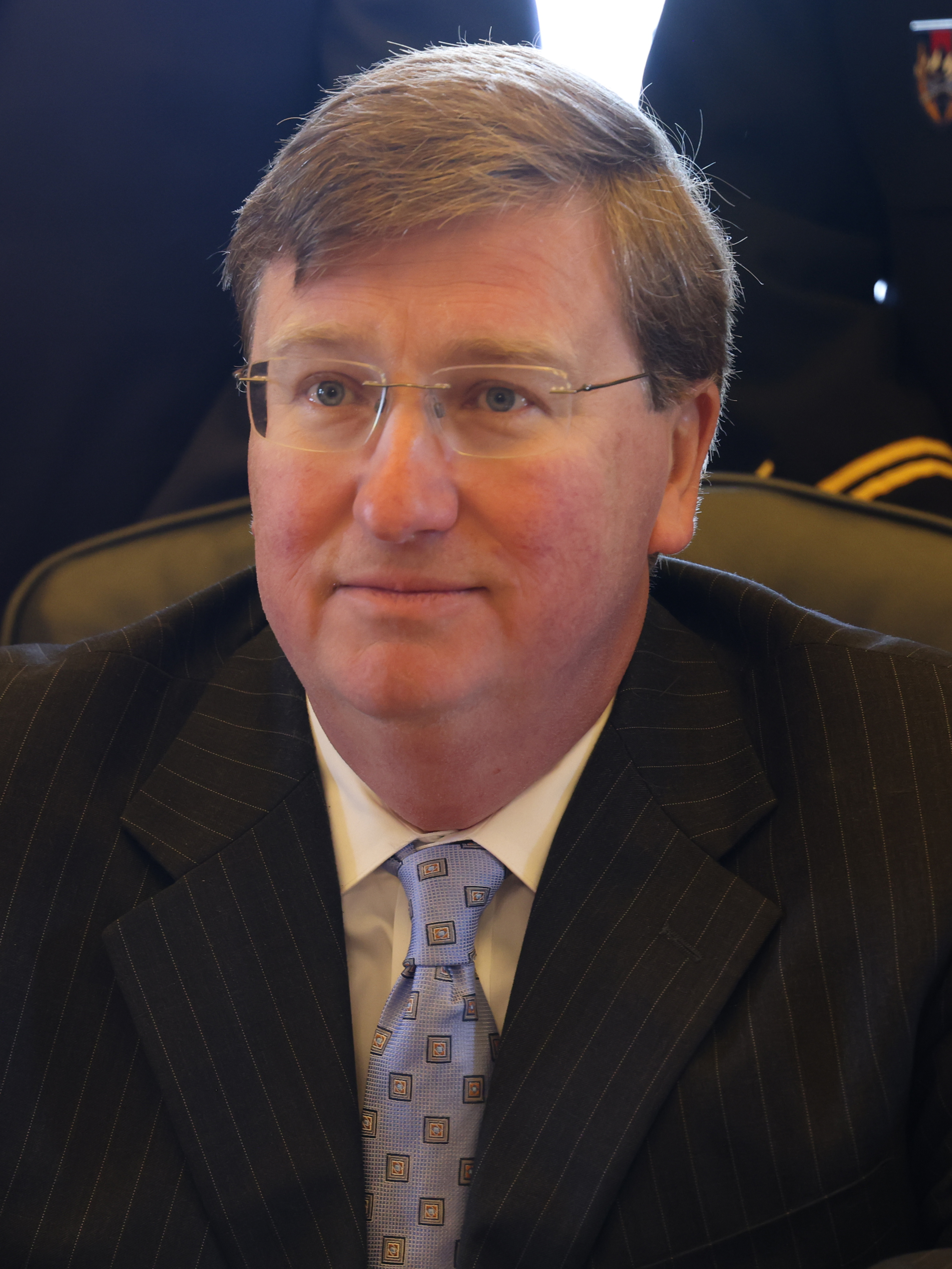
- Incumbent; Tate Reeves since January 14, 2020
- Style: Governor (informal); The Honorable (formal)
- Status: Head of state; Head of government
- Residence: Mississippi Governor's Mansion
- Term length: Four years, renewable once
- Formation: Constitution of Mississippi
- Succession: Line of succession
- Deputy: Lieutenant Governor of Mississippi
- Salary: $122,160 (2022)
- Website: governor.ms.gov

The governor of Mississippi is the head of government of Mississippi and the commander-in-chief of the state's military forces. The governor has a duty to enforce state laws, and the power to either approve or veto bills passed by the Mississippi Legislature, to convene the legislature at any time, and, except in cases of treason or impeachment, to grant pardons and reprieves.

== History of the office ==
Upon its creation in 1798, the Mississippi Territory was given a government which included a governor. Mississippi was given statehood in 1817. Its first constitution provided for a weak governor with limited appointive powers and limited to serving a two-year term. The term was extended to four years in the 1869 constitution. In 1918, legislation was passed enabling the governor to submit budget proposals to the legislature. In 1986, voters approved an amendment to the constitution permitting the governor to seek election to a consecutive term.

== Election ==
Any potential candidate for governor must be at least 30 years of age and have been a citizen of the United States for at least 20 years and a resident of Mississippi for at least five years preceding election. They serve for a four-year term and are limited to serving two consecutive terms in office.

== Powers and duties ==
=== Executive authority and responsibilities ===
The constitution of Mississippi vests the chief executive power of the state in the governor. The governor is empowered to request other executive officials in state government to report to them in writing on subjects relating to executive duties. They are designated the commander-in-chief of the state's militia/National Guard contingent, except when the force is placed into federal service. The constitution further empowers the governor to issue pardons and reprieves for crimes except in cases of treason or impeachment.

=== Legislative authority and responsibilities ===
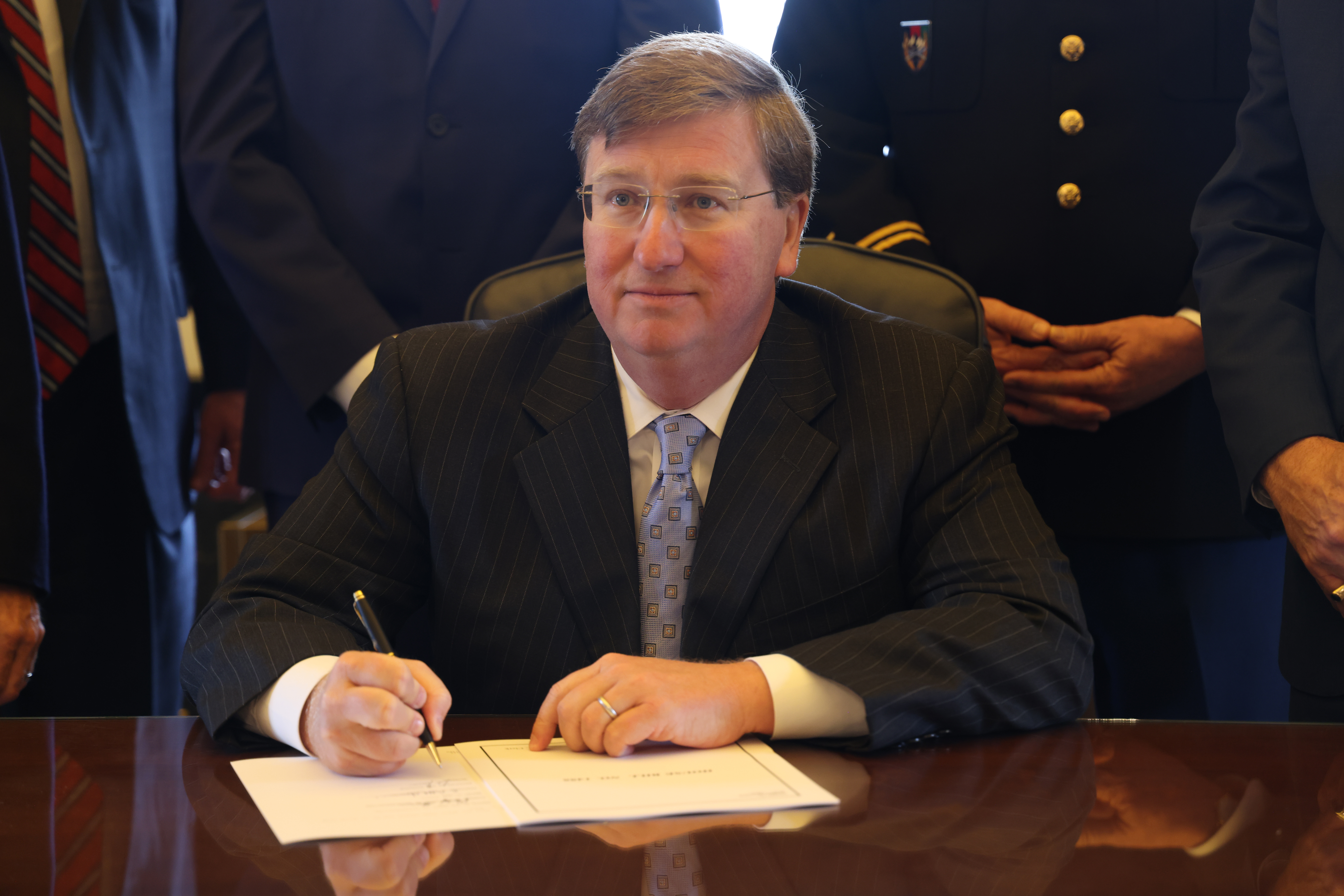
Governor Tate Reeves signing a bill into law, 2022

The governor is constitutionally obligated to report to the Mississippi Legislature on the affairs of state government, commonly delivered as a "State of the State" of address to a joint session of the body. The governor can also supply policy suggestions to the legislature, which can consider or ignore them at its discretion. (Note: In modern times, policy suggestions from the governor to the legislature are usually intimated through private discussions.) By law, the governor is empowered to submit an executive budget recommendation to the legislature and is responsible for jointly adopting state revenue projections with the Joint Legislative Budget Committee.

The governor is empowered to, at their discretion, call the legislature into special session to address an issue of the governor's choosing. The governor signs bills passed by the legislature of which they approve into law and are empowered to veto bills of which they disapprove. They have line-item veto power over appropriations bills but can only veto general bills in full. (Note: Beginning in the 1890s, the Supreme Court of Mississippi construed the relevant constitutional provisions as giving the governor line-item veto power over specific expenditures detailed in appropriations bills, but not allowing them to veto the "conditions and purposes" of such bills. In two rulings in 2020, the Supreme Court expanded the governor's power by allowing them to veto any portion of an appropriations bill.) A veto can be overridden by a two-thirds majority vote of the assembly. Legislation can also take effect without the governor's signature if they chose not to veto it within five days of its passage.

== Succession ==
The governor, like other state officials, can be impeached by the House of Representatives for committing acts of "treason, bribery, or any high crime or misdemeanor". In the event the governor is impeached by the House, the Senate convenes as an impeachment court under the leadership of the chief justice of the Supreme Court. A two-thirds affirmative vote of the senators present constitutes a conviction and thus their removal from office.

In the event the governor of Mississippi dies, is incapacitated, or leaves the state, the lieutenant governor assumes their responsibilities as acting governor. In the event the lieutenant governor is unavailable, the line of succession passes to the president pro tempore of the Senate and then the speaker of the House. In the event neither of them are available, the constitution requires that the secretary of state convene the Senate to designate a successor to the office.

== Office structure ==
The governor works out of three office spaces: a main one in the Walter Sillers State Office Building, one in the Governor's Mansion, and a ceremonial one in the Mississippi State Capitol. The governor's office retains staff which aid the chief executive in the pursuance of their duties, conduct research, and serve as liaisons with other state agencies.

The governor's salary is fixed by the legislature and cannot be reduced during their term of office. The governor's salary is $122,160 per year, but is set to increase to $160,000 annually in 2024.

== Political dynamics ==
The governor of Mississippi has weak institutional authority due to their lack of constitutionally prescribed powers, significant constraints on their powers, and the diffusion of state executive authority across other elected officials. Unlike in other states, Mississippi's governor has little constitutional or statutory authority over the state budget process. As the state developed a competitive two-party system, governors became more important as party leaders with regards to their partisan counterparts in the legislature.

== Timeline ==
Timeline of Mississippi governors

== See also ==
- List of first ladies of Mississippi

== Works cited ==
- Pugh, Brian (2019). "The Mississippi Legislature's Dominance over Budgeting Pre-Reform" (PDF). The Journal of Mississippi History. LXXXI (3–4): 163–184. ISSN 0022-2771.
- Mississippi Official and Statistical Register 2020–2024. Jackson: Mississippi Secretary of State. 2021. OCLC 1353823876.
- Nash, Jere (2019). "Edmund Favor Noel (1908–1912) and the Rise of James K. Vardaman and Theodore G. Bilbo" (PDF). The Journal of Mississippi History. LXXXI (1–2): 3–22. ISSN 0022-2771.
- Nash, Jere; Taggart, Andy (2009). Mississippi Politics: The Struggle for Power, 1976-2008 (second ed.). University Press of Mississippi. ISBN 9781604733570.
- Winkle, John W. III (2014). The Mississippi State Constitution (second ed.). Oxford University Press. ISBN 9780199300631.
