= Tempo (software) =

Calendar application for iOS

Tempo was an artificial intelligence-enhanced calendar application for iOS. Developed by Tempo AI, a spinoff of SRI International, the application was reviewed by numerous blogs and media outlets, including Wired, VentureBeat, TechCrunch, and others. Raj Singh, Thierry Donneau-Golencer and Corey Hulen are the Co-Founders of Tempo AI, Inc.

Using data (from social media, calendars, emails, contacts, location, etc.) stored on a user's iPhone or iPod touch, Tempo compiled information related to any given event and displayed it when requested, hence making the application context-aware.

== Information ==
The application was launched on February 13, 2013, and a reservation system was implemented on February 18, 2013, in order to handle high demand of over 100,000 signups. The day the reservation system was launched, nearly 73% of the ratings Tempo received in the App Store were one-star, the lowest possible. Previously, the application had received mainly five-star ratings.

On May 29, 2015, it was announced that Tempo had been acquired by Salesforce.com. The Tempo app was shut down on June 30, 2015.
