= Capital One Tower =

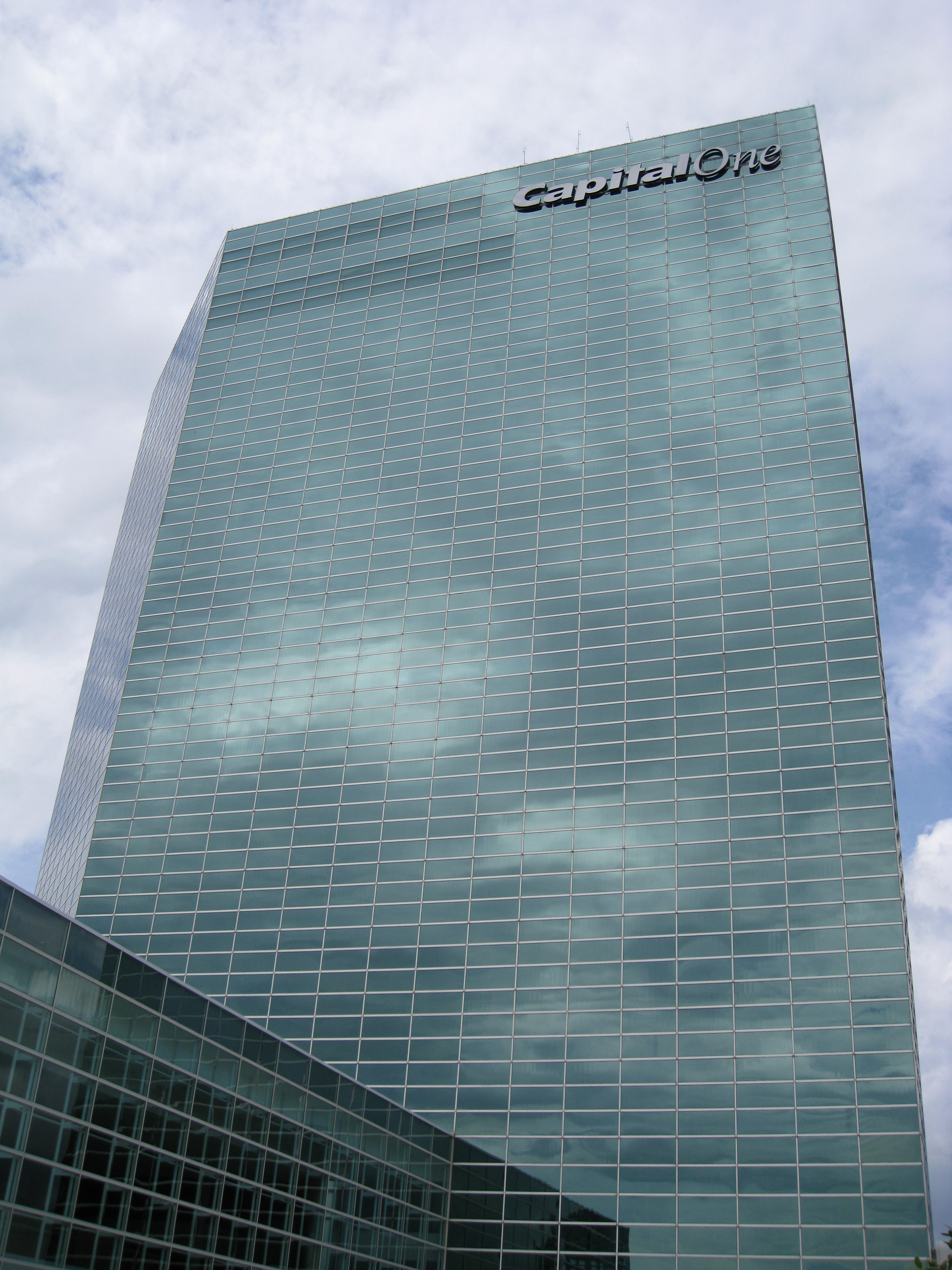
Capital One Tower

Capital One Tower may refer to:

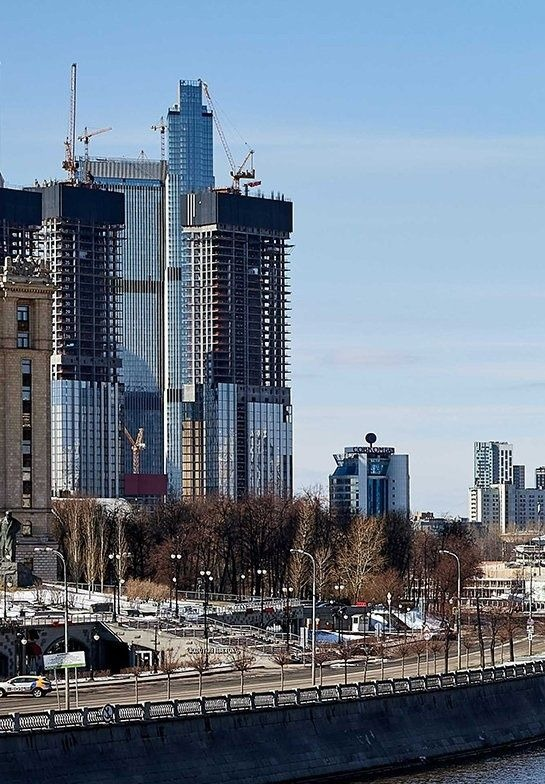
Capital Towers1

- Capital One Tower (Louisiana), a Hertz Investment Group tower
- Capital One Tower (Virginia), the headquarters of Capital One
