= Judah Hertz =

- Born: 1948 or 1949; Brooklyn, New York City, U.S.
- Died: February 4, 2021 (aged 72); Los Angeles, California, U.S.
- Occupation: Real estate investor
- Known for: Hertz Investment Group
- Spouse: Astrid Hertz

Judah Hertz (1948 or 1949 – February 4, 2021) was an American real estate investor and philanthropist. He was the founder of the Hertz Investment Group and owned many office buildings in Downtown Los Angeles, the New Orleans Central Business District and other cities across the Southern United States.

== Early life ==
Judah Hertz was born circa 1948/1949 in Brooklyn, New York City.

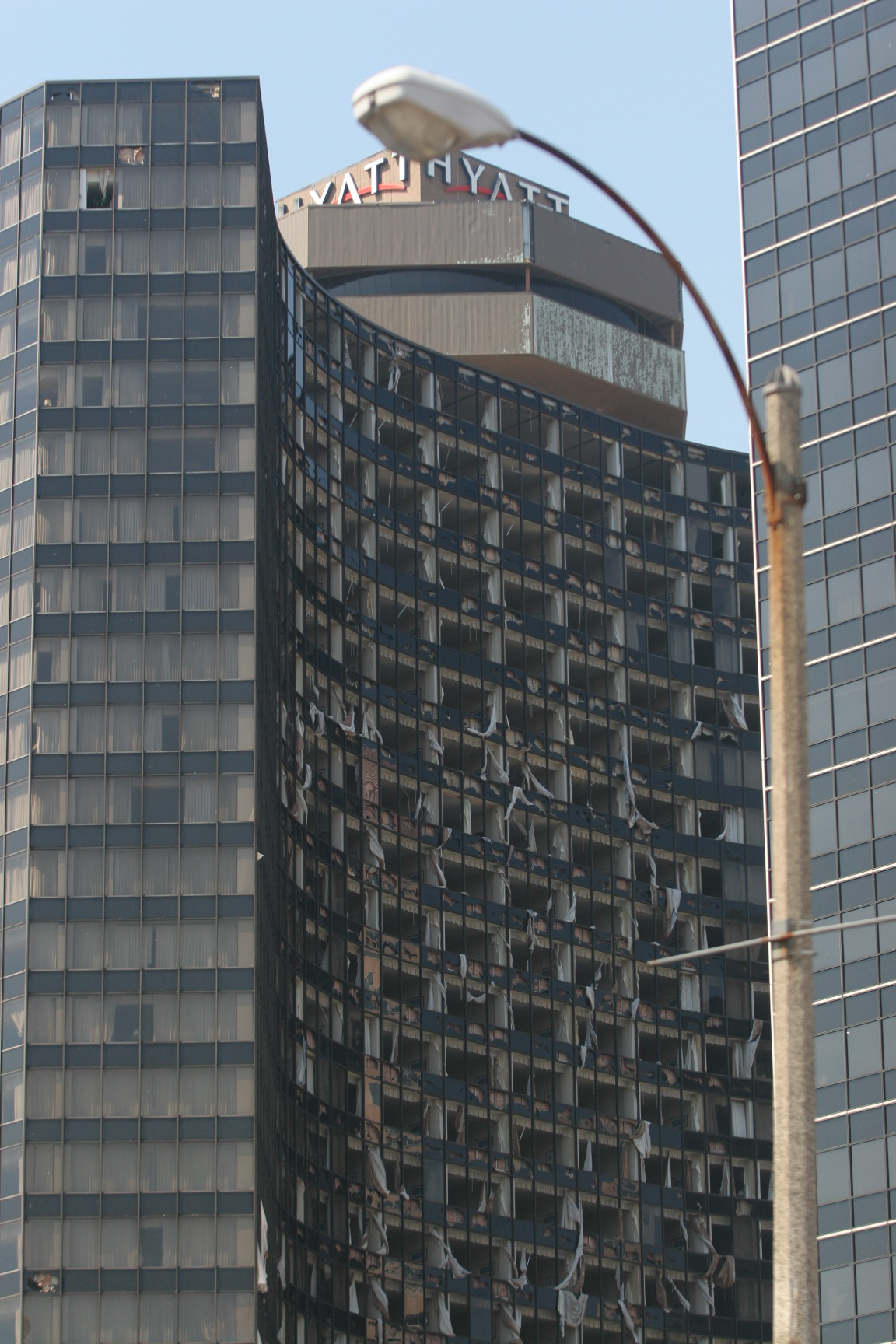
The Hyatt Regency in New Orleans two weeks after Hurricane Katrina, with broken windows.

== Career ==
Hertz founded the Hertz Investment Group, a real estate investment company based in Santa Monica, California, in 1979. The company includes a subsidiary, Sapphire Gaming, which invests in casinos.

Hertz acquired the California Mart, also known as the California Market Center, in Downtown Los Angeles in 2000, only to sell the building complex to investor David Lee for US$135 million in 2004-2005. By 2000, Hertz was the owner of "about 3 million square feet of office space" in Downtown Los Angeles.

Hertz acquired the Comstock Hotel & Casino in Reno, Nevada in 1999, but sold it by 2000. However, by 2000, he was denied a license in Nevada by the Nevada Gaming Commission, then chaired by Brian Sandoval. Hertz denied any wrongdoing.

Four weeks before Hurricane Katrina in 2005, Hertz acquired several buildings in the Central Business District of New Orleans, Louisiana, including the Hyatt Regency, the Dominion Tower, the New Orleans Centre, and One Shell Square. He also acquired the Poydras Center, the Louisiana Land and Exploration Company Building, the Texaco Center on Poydras Street. In total, he spent US$200 million. Hertz weathered the hurricane thanks to his insurance. By 2006, Hertz was in disagreement with Laurence S. Geller, the chief executive officer of the Strategic Hotels & Resorts, over the ownership of the Hyatt Regency.

Hertz subsequently acquired buildings in Downtown Memphis. In 2007, he began acquiring buildings in Jackson, Mississippi, including the "Pinnacle, One Jackson Place, 111 East Capitol, Regions Plaza and Regions Bank Building." By 2015, Hertz returned to investing in New Orleans real estate and acquired One Shell Square. He also acquired office buildings in Birmingham, Alabama, Columbia, South Carolina and Greensboro, North Carolina. Hertz spent US$417 million on the buildings in the four cities. That same year, he acquired City Centre, another high-rise building in Jackson, Mississippi, from Parkway Properties.

== Philanthropy ==
Hertz has held an annual fundraiser for the Ahmanson/UCLA Adult Congenital Heart Disease Center at UCLA since 1997. For example, it raised US$155,000 in 2003.

Hertz served on the World Chairman's Council of the Jewish National Fund, which means he has donated US$1 million or more to the JNF.

== Personal life ==
Hertz had a wife, Astrid. Their wedding was held in Bel Air, Los Angeles in 2013. He died on February 4, 2021, in Los Angeles, California.
