= List of tallest buildings in Mississippi =

== Buildings in Mississippi taller than 300 ft (91 m) ==
Rank	Building	Image	City	Height ft (m)	Floors	Year built	Notes
1	Beau Rivage Casino Hotel		Biloxi	346 feet (105 m)	32	1999	Tallest building in Biloxi and Mississippi. Was damaged by Hurricane Katrina in 2005.
2	IP Casino Hotel		Biloxi	335 feet (102 m)	32	1997	Tallest building in Mississippi from 1997 to 1999.
3	Regions Plaza		Jackson	318 feet (97 m)	22	1975	Tallest building in Jackson since its completion in 1975.
4	Gold Strike Casino Hotel		Tunica Resorts	317 feet (97 m)	31	1998	
5	Golden Moon Hotel Casino		Philadelphia	310 feet (94 m)	22	2000	

,
