= Salesloft =

US sales engagement platform since 2011

- Type: Private
- Industry: Sales Engagement
- Founded: 2011
- Founder: Kyle Porter, Rob Forman, Tim Dorr, and David Cummings
- Headquarters: Atlanta, Georgia, U.S.
- Key people: Kyle Porter, Rob Forman, Tim Dorr, David Cummings and Tom Noonan
- Products: Sales Engagement Platform
- Website: salesloft.com

Salesloft is a sales engagement platform. The company was founded in September 2011. Though its original product offering focused on sales development, the company has since expanded its platform to offer functionality for the entire sales organization.

== History ==
The company's founders, Kyle Porter and David Cummings, met at Georgia Tech's Advanced Technology Development Center and incorporated Salesloft in September 2011. The company relocated to its new office in Regions Plaza in Midtown Atlanta in August 2017.

Based in Atlanta, Georgia, with additional offices in San Francisco, New York, London, Singapore and Guadalajara, Mexico, Salesloft has more than 700 employees and was recognized as the #1 best place to work in Atlanta. The company was also named the 7th Fastest-Growing Technology Company in North America by Deloitte. In April 2019, Salesloft raised a $70M venture round, led by Insight Venture Partners.

In August 2025, Salesloft announced an agreement to merge with Clari, a revenue orchestration platform company.

In March 2026, Salesloft and Clari announced a year-long partnership with the nonprofit Women in Revenue to provide mentorship and professional development opportunities for women in revenue-related roles.

== 2025 security incident ==
In August 2025, Salesloft disclosed a major cybersecurity incident involving its Drift platform, which it had acquired in February 2024. Initially believed to impact only Salesforce-integrated customers, the breach was later found to be significantly more widespread, affecting a broad array of third-party integrations and potentially compromising over 700 organizations.

The incident was attributed to a financially motivated threat group tracked by Google as UNC6395, which exploited Drift integrations to access connected systems. Researchers from Mandiant and Google's Threat Intelligence Group confirmed that the attackers were able to retrieve OAuth tokens and API keys, enabling access to services including Google Workspace, AWS, VPNs, and Snowflake environments.The ShinyHunters cybercriminal group claimed responsibility to the press, which was later confirmed by BleepingComputer.

Google warned that any Drift integration, regardless of platform, should be considered potentially compromised.

In response, Salesloft recommended that all Drift customers revoke and rotate any existing API keys and began working with Mandiant, Google Cloud, and cyber insurer Coalition to investigate the full extent of the breach. Salesforce also disabled all Drift integrations with its platform as a precaution. Salesloft later took the Drift application offline. The integration between the Salesloft platform and Salesforce was restored in September 2025.

As of early September 2025, the root cause of the breach remained unknown, and the full scope of the compromise was still under investigation. The incident highlighted the security risks of interconnected SaaS platforms. DriftBreach.com was launched to track companies that publicly confirmed they were affected by the breach.

== Acquisition ==
2018

- Acquired North Carolina startup Noteninja for an undisclosed amount.

2019

- Acquired Indianapolis-based sales assistant software company Costello for an undisclosed amount.

2024

- Acquired Drift for an undisclosed amount.
