= Salesforce =

American software company

Salesforce, Inc.

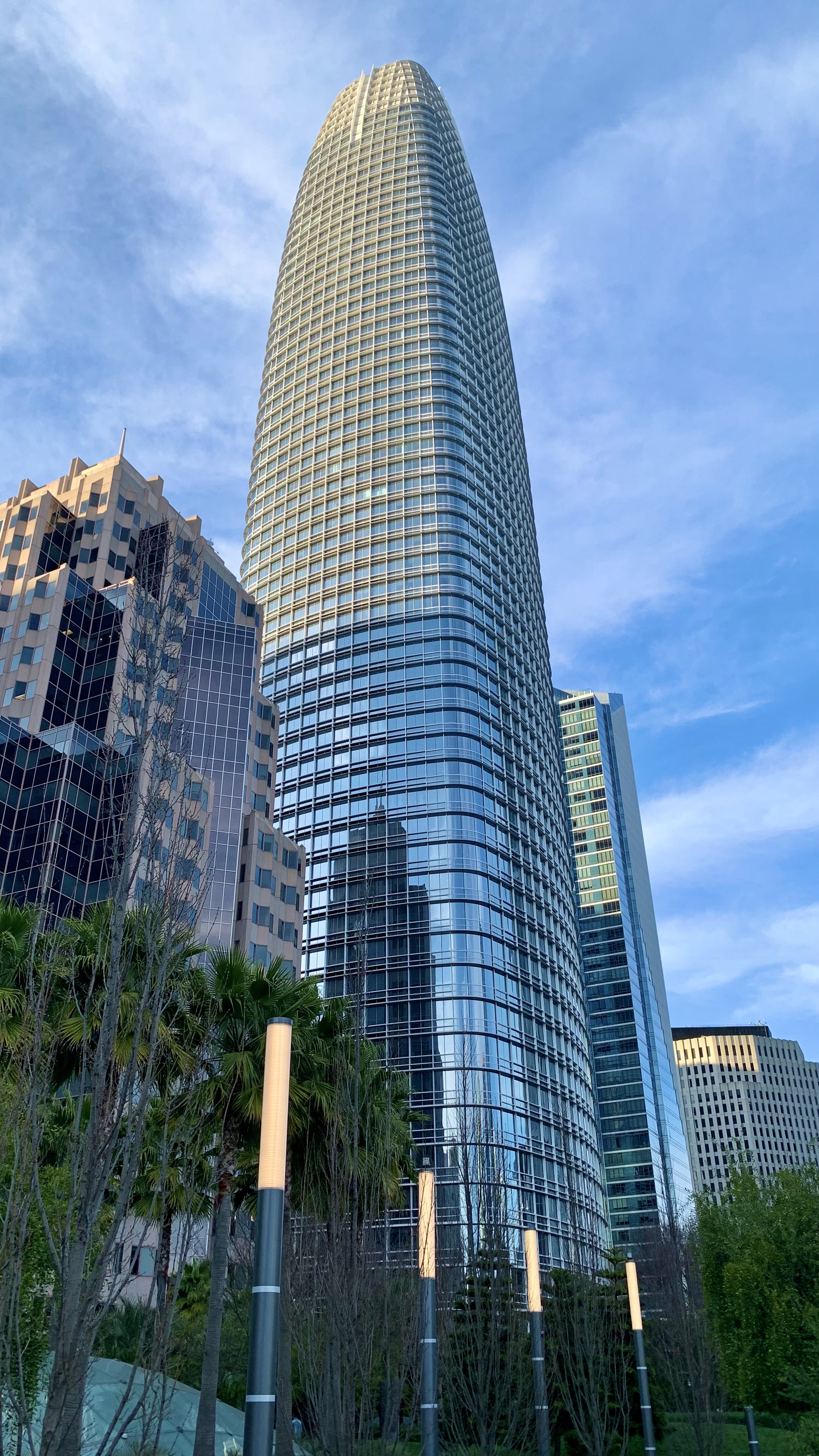
- Salesforce Tower in San Francisco, the headquarters of Salesforce
- Formerly: Salesforce.com, Inc. (1999–2022)
- Type: Public
- Traded as: NYSE: CRM; DJIA component; S&P 100 component; S&P 500 component
- Industry: Information technology
- Founded: March 8, 1999; 27 years ago
- Founders: Marc Benioff; Parker Harris; Dave Moellenhoff; Frank Dominguez
- Headquarters: Salesforce Tower; San Francisco, California, U.S.
- Key people: Marc Benioff (chairman & CEO); Parker Harris (CTO)
- Products: Software for customer relationship management
- Services: Software as a service
- Revenue: ▲US$41.525 billion (2026)
- Operating income: ▲US$8.331 billion (2026)
- Net income: ▲US$7.457 billion (2026)
- Total assets: ▲US$112.305 billion (2026)
- Total equity: ▼US$59.142 billion (2026)
- Number of employees: 83,334 (2026)
- Subsidiaries: Quip; Heroku; MuleSoft; Tableau Software; Acumen Solutions; Slack Technologies; Informatica
- ASN: 14340
- Website: salesforce.com
- Footnotes; Financials as of January 31, 2026.

Salesforce, Inc. is an American software company headquartered in San Francisco, California; the company develops customer relationship management (CRM) software and market it through a subscription business model (software as a service, SaaS). The company is a component of the Dow Jones Industrial Average (since 2020) and the S&P 500.

Since the 2020s, the company has also started developing software for artificial intelligence products.

== History ==
Salesforce was founded on March 8, 1999, by former Oracle executive Marc Benioff, together with Parker Harris, Dave Moellenhoff, and Frank Dominguez as a software-as-a-service (SaaS) company. The first prototype of Salesforce was launched in November 1999. Some of its earliest investors were Larry Ellison, the co-founder of Oracle, and Halsey Minor, the founder of CNET.

Salesforce was severely affected by the dot-com bubble bursting at the beginning of the new millennium, resulting in the company laying off 20% of its workforce. Despite its losses, Salesforce held up during the early 2000s. Salesforce also gained notability during this period for its "the end of software" tagline and marketing campaign, and even hired actors to hold up signs with its slogan outside a Siebel Systems conference.

In 2003, Salesforce held its first annual Dreamforce conference in San Francisco. In June 2004, the company had its initial public offering on the New York Stock Exchange (under the stock symbol CRM) and raised US$110 million. In 2006, Salesforce launched Idea Exchange, a platform that allows customers to connect with company product managers.

In 2009, Salesforce passed $1 billion in annual revenue. The company launched Service Cloud that same year, an application that helps companies manage service conversations about their products and services.

In 2014, the company released Trailhead, a free online learning platform for its products. In October 2014, Salesforce announced the development of its Customer Success Platform. Salesforce licensed the right to use Albert Einstein's image and likeness from the Einstein Estate under a 20-year agreement for $20 million, restricted to business software applications.

Salesforce acquired the visual analytics and business intelligence software platform Tableau in August 2019 for $15.7 billion.

In 2020, Salesforce joined the Dow Jones Industrial Average, replacing energy giant and Standard Oil-descendant ExxonMobil. Salesforce's ascension to the Dow Jones was concurrent with that of Amgen and Honeywell. Because the Dow Jones factors its components by market price, Salesforce was the largest technology component of the index at its accession.

Keith Block stepped down as co-CEO in February 2020, leaving Marc Benioff as sole chairman and CEO. In February 2021, Amy Weaver, previously the chief legal officer, became CFO, where she served until stepping down in August 2024. Former CFO Mark Hawkins announced that he would be retiring in October. In November 2021, Bret Taylor was named vice chair and co-CEO of the company alongside Benioff.

Salesforce acquired Slack for $27.7 billion in July 2021, the largest deal in company history at the time.

In November 2022, Salesforce announced it would terminate some employees from its sales team. That same month, Salesforce announced its co-CEO and vice chair, Bret Taylor, would be stepping down from his roles at the end of January 2023, with Benioff continuing to run the company and serve as board chair. Within the week, former Tableau CEO Mark Nelson and former Slack CEO Stewart Butterfield also announced their departures. When asked about departures, Benioff stated, "people come and people go." Following these executive transitions, Salesforce's stock declined significantly, with market analysts attributing the decline to concerns about leadership stability and strategic continuity.

In January 2023, the company announced a layoff of about 10%, or approximately 8,000 positions. According to Benioff, the company hired too aggressively during the COVID-19 pandemic and the increase in working from home led to the layoff. The company also reduced office space as part of the restructuring plan. The same month brought an announcement from activist investor Elliott Management that it would acquire a "big stake" in the company.

In January 2024, Salesforce announced it was laying off 700 of its global staff.

In October 2025, Salesforce CEO Marc Benioff declared his avid support of Donald Trump and urged him to deploy the National Guard to San Francisco as Trump was deploying federal troops to other cities. The comments generated significant controversy for Benioff and Salesforce, including push-back from San Francisco mayor Daniel Lurie and District Attorney Brooke Jenkins and the resignation of Ron Conway from the Salesforce Foundation board. Benioff subsequently apologized for his National Guard comments. That same month, Salesforce pitched the Trump administration on ways that Salesforce's AI tools could help Immigration and Customs Enforcement (ICE) triple its staff to support the administration's mass deportation campaign. The company had previously contracted for ICE under the Obama and Biden administrations.

== Services ==
Salesforce offers several customer relationship management (CRM) services for enterprises and small businesses, including Sales Cloud, Service Cloud, Marketing Cloud,Commerce Cloud and Platform. Additional technologies include Slack.Salesforce also offers a free CRM for small teams of up to two people.

Other services include app creation, data integration and visualization, and training.

Salesforce launched a suite of features called Salesforce Foundations in September 2024, bundling connected functionality across department-specific Sales Cloud and Service Cloud products.

Salesforce introduced Headless 360 at its annual TDX developer conference in April 2026. Headless 360 exposes the Salesforce platform's data, workflows, and governance controls as APIs, MCP servers, and CLI commands, so tasks can be completed without browser interaction.

=== Artificial intelligence ===
In September and October 2024, the company deployed Agentforce (succeeding Salesforce Einstein), an agentic AI. This enables the use of chatbots within its software.

Salesforce CEO Marc Benioff said in a June 2025 interview that artificial intelligence performed between 30% and 50% of internal work at Salesforce, including functions such as software engineering, customer service, marketing, and analytics.

=== Cloud computing ===
Salesforce Platform host applications developed by other users, hosted on the company's cloud.

Force.com applications are built using Apex, a proprietary Java-like programming language, to generate HTML originally via the "Visualforce" framework. Beginning in 2015, the "Lightning Components" framework has been supported. The Apex language and compiler were initially designed by Craig Weissman.

As of 2014, the Force.com platform had 1.5 million registered developers according to Salesforce.

=== AppExchange ===
Launched in 2005, the Salesforce AppExchange is an online app store that allows users to sell third-party applications and consulting services.

=== Trailhead ===
Launched in 2014, Trailhead is a free online learning platform with courses focused on Salesforce technologies.

=== Discontinued ===
Desk.com was a SaaS help desk and customer support product acquired by Salesforce for $50 million in 2011, and consolidated with other services into Service Cloud Essentials in March 2018.

Do.com was a cloud-based task management system for small groups and businesses, introduced in 2011, and discontinued in 2014.

== Acquisitions ==
=== 2006–2019 ===
In 2006, Salesforce acquired Sendia, a mobile web service firm, for $15 million and Kieden, an online advertising company. In 2007, Koral, a content management service, was acquired. In 2008, Salesforce acquired Instranet for $31.5 million. In 2010, Salesforce acquired multiple companies, including Jigsaw, a cloud-based data service provider, for $142 million, Heroku, a Ruby application platform-as-a-service, for $212 million, and Activa Live Chat, a live chat software provider. In 2011, Salesforce acquired Dimdim, a web conferencing platform, for $31 million, Radian6, a social media tracking company, for $340 million, and Rypple, a performance management software company. Rypple became known as Work.com in 2012. In 2012, Salesforce acquired Buddy Media, a social media marketer, for $689 million, and GoInstant, a browser collaboration startup, for $70 million.

In 2013, Salesforce acquired ExactTarget, an email marketer, for $2.5 billion. In 2014, Salesforce acquired RelateIQ, a data company, for $390 million. In 2015, Salesforce acquired multiple companies for undisclosed sums, including Toopher, a mobile authentication company, Tempo, an AI calendar app, and MinHash, an AI platform. The company also acquired SteelBrick, a software company, for $360 million.

In 2016, Salesforce acquired Demandware, a cloud-based provider of e-commerce services, for $2.8 billion and Quip, a word processing app, for $750 million. In 2017, the company acquired Sequence, a user experience design agency. In 2018, Salesforce acquired several companies, including MuleSoft, a cloud service company, for $6.5 billion, as well as Rebel, an email services provider, and Datorama, an AI marketing platform.

In 2019, Salesforce completed its acquisition of analytics software company Tableau for $15.7 billion. Salesforce also acquired ClickSoftware for $1.35 billion in 2019.

=== 2020–present ===
Slack Technologies was acquired for $27.7 billion in 2021. Salesforce also made smaller acquisitions between 2020 and 2021, including consulting firm Acumen Solutions for $570 million, CRM firm Vlocity for $1.33 billion, privacy compliance startup Phennecs for $16.5 million, and robotic process automation firm Servicetrace.

Salesforce's acquired Slack-bot maker Troops.ai in July 2022.

In September 2023, Salesforce acquired Airkit.ai, a creator of AI-powered customer service applications and experiences. In December 2023, Salesforce acquired Spiff, an automated commission management platform.

In September 2024, Salesforce acquired data management firm Own for $1.9 billion, and enterprise management platform Zoomin. Salesforce has also acquired PredictSpring and Tenyx in 2024.

In June 2025, Salesforce announced plans to acquire data management platform Informatica for approximately $8 billion. The deal strengthens Salesforce's data integration and governance capabilities across its platform ecosystem. Prior negotiations in 2024 failed due to disagreements over valuation and deal structure.

In November 2025, Salesforce announced the successful completion of its acquisition of Informatica for approximately $8 billion in equity value. The deal was completed ahead of the original early-2026 target. By February 2026, Salesforce reported that Informatica had already begun contributing significantly to its financial results, including nearly $400 million in revenue during the fourth quarter of fiscal year 2026.

In June 2026, Salesforce announced the acquisition of Contentful for a reported sum of $1.5 billion. The acquisition was completed on September 1, 2026.

In June 2026, Salesforce announced that it had signed a definitive agreement to acquire m3ter, a London-based metering and rating platform for consumption-based billing.

Also in June 2026, Salesforce announced an agreement to acquire Fin, an artificial intelligence customer-service platform, for approximately $3.6 billion. The transaction was expected to close in the fourth quarter of Salesforce's fiscal year.In October, Salesforce announced an agreement to acquire Braze for approximately $5.66 billion.

== Operations ==
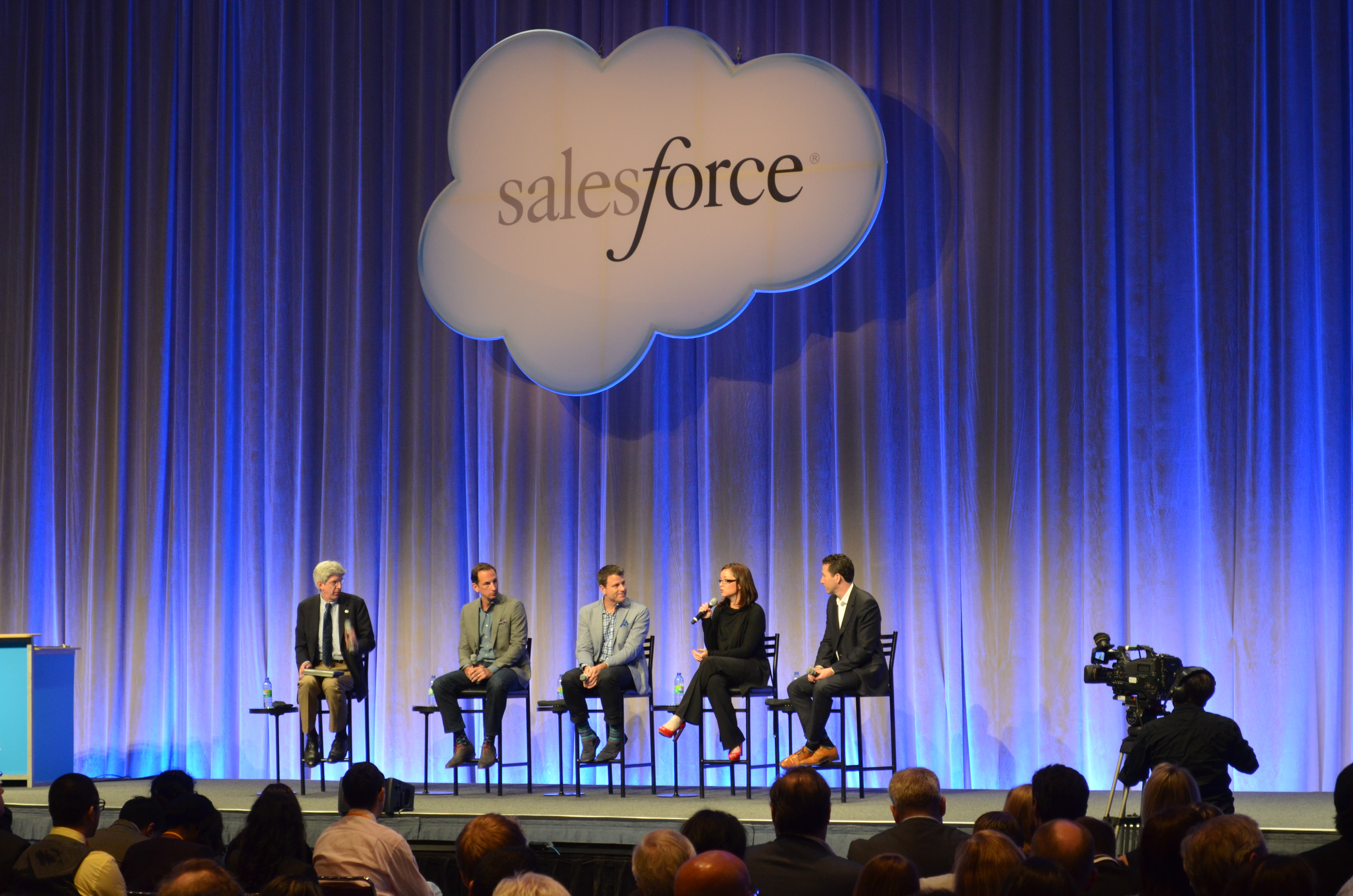
A discussion panel at Salesforce's Customer Company Tour event that focused on customer relationship management

Salesforce is headquartered in San Francisco in the Salesforce Tower. Salesforce has 110 offices, including offices in Hong Kong, Tel Aviv, London, Paris, Sydney and Tokyo.

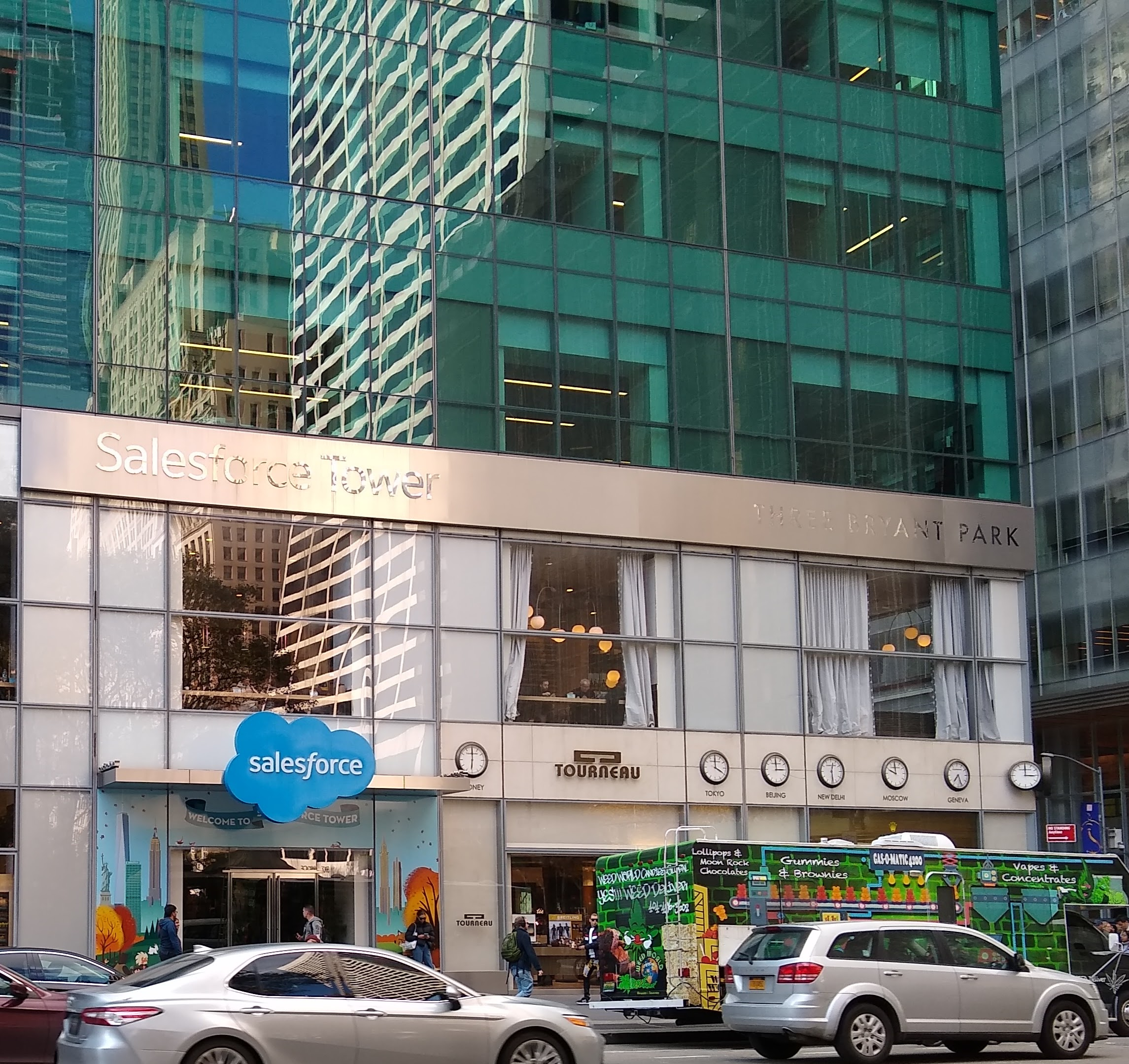
Salesforce Tower in New York City

Standard & Poor's added Salesforce to the S&P 500 Index in September 2008. In August 2020, S&P Dow Jones Indices announced that Salesforce would replace ExxonMobil in the Dow Jones Industrial Average.

=== Culture ===
According to Marc Benioff, Salesforce corporate culture is based on 'Ohana,' a Hawaiian concept emphasizing family and community. Benioff has described this philosophy as prioritizing employee well-being and broader stakeholder relationships.

In 2021, Cynthia Perry, a design research senior manager, publicly resigned from Salesforce alleging workplace discrimination related to diversity and inclusion practices and posting her resignation letter on LinkedIn.

On September 10, 2021, Benioff tweeted that the company is prepared to help any employee who wishes to move out of the state of Texas, following abortion legislation in Texas, announced on September 1, 2021.

=== Finances ===
Salesforce ranked 126th on the 2022 Fortune 500 list of the largest United States companies by revenue.

Year	Revenue US$ millions	Net income US$ millions	Total Assets US$ millions	Price per Share US$	Employees
2005	176	7	280	5.19	767
2006	310	28	435	8.62	1,304
2007	497	0	665	11.69	2,070
2008	749	18	1,090	13.43	2,606
2009	1,077	43	1,480	11.37	3,566
2010	1,306	81	2,460	24.21	3,969
2011	1,657	64	3,091	32.93	5,306
2012	2,267	−12	4,164	35.73	7,785
2013	3,050	−270	5,529	45.94	9,800
2014	4,071	−232	9,153	57.26	13,300
2015	5,374	−263	10,665	70.66	16,000
2016	6,667	−47	12,763	74.55	19,000
2017	8,392	180	17,585	90.26	25,000
2018	10,480	127	21,010	132.21	29,000
2019	13,282	1,110	30,737	155.10	35,000
2020	17,098	126	55,126	222.40	49,000
2021	21,252	4,072	66,301	255.33	56,606
2022	26,492	1,444	95,209	132.59	73,541
2023	31,352	208	98,849		79,390
2024	34,857	4,136	99,823		72,682
2025	37,895	6,197	102,928		76,453
2026	41,525	7,457	112,305		83,334

=== IT infrastructure ===
In 2008, Salesforce migrated from Sun Fire E25K servers with SPARC processors running Solaris, to Dell servers with AMD processors, running Linux.

In 2014, Salesforce opened a data center in the UK to handle European citizens' personal data.

In 2013, Salesforce and Oracle announced a nine-year partnership focusing on applications, platforms, and infrastructure.

In 2016, Salesforce announced that it will use Amazon Web Services hosting for countries with restrictive data residency requirements and where no Salesforce data centers are operating.

== Cybersecurity incidents ==
=== 2007 Phishing attack ===
In November 2007, a phishing attack compromised contact information on a number of Salesforce customers. Some customers then received phishing emails that appeared to be invoices from Salesforce. A Salesforce employee's credentials were stolen through social engineering. Salesforce stated the incident resulted from human manipulation rather than a software vulnerability in its platform.

=== 2022 Heroku OAuth token theft (Salesforce subsidiary) ===
On April 13, 2022, GitHub notified Heroku of unauthorized access to its systems through a compromised OAuth token. Heroku immediately revoked all affected tokens and notified customers to update their credentials.

=== 2025-2026 ShinyHunters targeted campaigns against Salesforce ===
ShinyHunters has conducted several widespread data theft and extortion campaigns against Salesforce and thousands of its customers as noted by Google's Threat Intelligence Group/Mandiant, Salesforce, and the FBI.

- UNC6040 Modified Data Loader / Vishing - ShinyHunters threat actors executed a social engineering (security) campaign in which employees were persuaded to install a tampered version of Salesforce Data Loader. The Trojan horse (computing) client functioned as a malware dropper, enabling credential theft, unauthorized access, and large-scale data exfiltration, which was subsequently used for extortion against multiple organizations. Salesforce confirmed the campaign abused user trust and vishing techniques, clarifying that no vulnerability in the Salesforce platform itself was exploited.
- ShinyHunters/UNC6395 threat actors compromised OAuth and refresh tokens through the Salesloft-Drift integration, enabling unauthorized access to Salesforce customer instance. In response, Salesforce and Salesloft revoked all affected Drift tokens and removed the application software from AppExchange pending investigation.
- ShinyHunters/UNC6395 threat actors compromised another OAuth and refresh tokens through Gainsight integration, enabling unauthorized access to Salesforce customer instances. In response, Salesforce and Gainsight revoked all their integration apps pending further investigation.
- Salesforce released another major security advisory linking a "known threat group", believed to be ShinyHunters, to exploiting misconfigurations in their Salesforce Experience Cloud software. The hacking group claimed responsibility for these data theft attacks and issued a warning to affected Salesforce customers to pay up or their data would be leaked. The hacking group claimed to have breached about 400 companies.

== Controversies ==
=== ‘Meatpistol’ presenters fired at Def Con ===
In 2017, two Salesforce security engineers were fired after giving a presentation at DEF CON discussing a Salesforce pentesting framework called MEATPISTOL. MEATPISTOL was a Salesforce-developed exploit framework similar to (and named after) Metasploit. Salesforce had previously planned to open source the framework, but changed plans just before the presentation, and fired them immediately afterward. The presenters were sent a message half an hour before the presentation telling them to cancel the talk, but they did not see the message until afterward. The terminated employees called on the company to open-source the software after being dismissed.

=== RAICES donation refusal ===
In 2018, the not-for-profit organization Refugee and Immigrant Center for Education and Legal Services (RAICES) rejected a US$250,000 donation from Salesforce unless the company ended its technology services to U.S. Customs and Border Protection. RAICES claimed accepting funds from a company which supported immigration enforcement conflicted with its mission to advocate for immigrant and refugee rights. Salesforce declined to end their relationship with US Customs, and issued a statement saying the company did not support separating migrant families. Salesforce offered to donate $1 million to help families who were separated.

=== Cultural appropriation ===
In September 2018, Bloomberg reported on internal Salesforce employee communications accusing the company of appropriating Hawaiian language and culture, at a time when "Native Hawaiians, Native Americans, and Pacific Islanders collectively held less than 1 percent of the jobs" at Salesforce. Salesforce's chief equality officer acknowledged that some of the examples were "problematic", and, in 2019, Salesforce announced a shift away from such usage, although several exceptions were made.

=== 2018 taxes ===
According to an Institute on Taxation and Economic Policy analysis published in December 2019, Salesforce paid no federal income tax on its 2018 profits, achieving a 0% effective tax rate. The report attributed this to provisions in the 2017 Tax Cuts and Jobs Act of 2017 and available tax credits and deductions. These findings were published in a report based on the 379 Fortune 500 companies that declared a profit in 2018.

=== Sex-trafficking lawsuit ===
In March 2019, Salesforce faced a lawsuit by 50 anonymous women claiming to be victims and survivors of sex trafficking, abuse, and rape, alleging the company profited from and helped build technology that facilitated sex trafficking on the now-defunct Backpage.com. In March 2021, a judge granted partial dismissal of the case, dismissing charges of negligence and conspiracy, but allowed the case to proceed regarding charges of sex trafficking. In March 2024, the case was dismissed without prejudice, meaning the plaintiffs could potentially refile their claims in the future. In September 2024, the US Court of Appeals for the Ninth Circuit denied a motion to reverse the dismissal.

=== Disability discrimination lawsuit in Japan ===
In July 2021, a former Salesforce Japan employee sued the company in Tokyo District Court, alleging discrimination based on disabilities (autism and ADHD), including denial of reasonable workplace accommodations. At that time, Japanese law required private companies to employ at least 2.3% disabled employees or pay a mandatory levy. Salesforce Japan reportedly failed to meet this threshold from 2009 to 2021 (except in 2017) and did not report the number of disabled employees to labor officials in 2020. The firm declined to comment on the suit to the media. The ex-employee, who is autistic with ADHD, claimed she was discriminated against because of her disability and was terminated from the firm's Japanese web marketing team. The suit alleged that the anonymous woman, as an employee at Salesforce Japan from 2018 to 2020, faced hate speech, microaggressions, and rejection of reasonable accommodation from the manager. She alleged that her attempts to resolve the problem were met with pressure from HR and a job coach. As of 2026, no public record of a resolution to this case has been reported.

=== Employee layoffs/Matthew McConaughey's salary ===
In January 2023, Salesforce reported that 8,000 employees had been laid off as a result of over-hiring during the COVID-19 lockdowns and a global economic downturn. In March 2023, the Wall Street Journal reported that actor Matthew McConaughey received annual compensation of approximately $10 million as a 'creative advisor and TV pitchman.' The arrangement was disclosed amid scrutiny of executive spending during the company's major 2023 layoffs. American musician will.i.am was also cited as being on the company's payroll due to his "strong understanding of technology".

=== Wrongful termination lawsuit ===
In September 2024, former Salesforce Senior Director Dina Zelikson filed a lawsuit against the company in San Francisco Superior Court, alleging wrongful termination, discrimination, and retaliation during a medical leave.

=== 2025 layoffs and CEO declarations ===
In September 2025, Benioff drew criticism after announcing that Salesforce had eliminated approximately 4,000 customer service roles following the deployment of AI-powered support agents. Speaking on The Logan Bartlett Show podcast, he said the company reduced its support workforce from 9,000 to about 5,000 employees because he "need[ed] less heads." According to Salesforce, deployed AI agents handle approximately 50% of customer support interactions, with reported cost reductions of 17% relative to support operations in early 2025. The decision contrasted with Benioff's earlier remarks suggesting that artificial intelligence would augment, rather than replace, white-collar workers.

=== 2026 AI-focused workforce reductions ===
In February 2026, Salesforce initiated a new round of layoffs affecting approximately 1,000 employees across its marketing, product management, and data analytics departments. The cuts reportedly included staff from the Agentforce AI product team, the department responsible for the company's pivot to autonomous agents.

=== 2026 company kickoff and ICE controversy ===
During Salesforce's annual company kickoff in February 2026, CEO Marc Benioff made a series of jokes regarding U.S. Immigration and Customs Enforcement (ICE). During a keynote address, Benioff asked international employees to stand and then quipped that "ICE agents were in the back of the room to keep tabs on them."

The comments caused widespread outrage on internal Slack channels, with employees circulating a letter demanding the company denounce ICE and halt the sale of Agentforce infrastructure to the agency. The incident led to a public rebuke from co-founder Parker Harris, who stated he was "not OK" with the remarks. In March 2026, company president Robin Washington held a town hall to address "internal tensions" and the resulting leaks to the press regarding the incident.

== Salesforce Ventures ==
In 2009, Salesforce began investing in startups. These investments became Salesforce Ventures, headed by John Somorjai. In September 2014, SFV set up Salesforce1 Fund, aimed at start-ups creating applications primarily for mobile phones. In December 2018, Salesforce Ventures announced the launch of the Japan Trailblazer Fund, focused on Japanese startups.

In August 2018, Salesforce Ventures reported investments totaling over $1 billion in 275 companies, including CloudCraze (e-commerce), Figure Eight (artificial intelligence), Forter (online fraud prevention), and FinancialForce (automation software). In 2019, SFV's five largest investments—Domo (data-visualization software), SurveyMonkey (online survey software), Twilio (cloud-communication), Dropbox (cloud storage), and DocuSign (secure e-signature company)—accounted for nearly half of its portfolio. In 2021, Salesforce announced that its investments had resulted in a $2.17 billion annual gain. In September 2024, Salesforce increased the size of its Generative AI Fund for startups to $1 billion.

As of September 2024, Salesforce Ventures has invested $5 billion in companies based in 27 different countries.

== Office locations ==
- Salesforce Tower (San Francisco, US)
- Salesforce Tower (Indianapolis, US)
- Heron Tower, 110 Bishopsgate (London, UK)
- Salesforce Tower (Sydney, AU)
- Salesforce Tower (Chicago, US)
- Salesforce Tower (New York, US)
- Salesforce Singapore
