= Quip (software) =

Collaborative productivity software suite

- Type: Subsidiary
- Founded: 2012; 14 years ago
- Founders: Bret Taylor; Kevin Gibbs
- Headquarters: San Francisco, United States
- Parent: Salesforce.com (2016–present)
- Website: quip.com

Quip is a collaborative productivity software suite for mobile and the Web. It allows groups of people to create and edit documents and spreadsheets as a group, typically for business purposes.

== History ==
Quip was founded by Bret Taylor, a co-creator of Google Maps, CEO of FriendFeed, and the former CTO of Facebook, along with Kevin Gibbs, who founded Google App Engine. Taylor founded the company in 2012, after leaving his position at Facebook. Roughly a year later, Quip was launched to the public as a mobile-centric tool for creating shared notes, lists, and documents. The app was well-received, winning accolades as one of the best apps of the year from Time, The Next Web, and The Guardian.

In 2015, Quip announced it had received a $30 million funding round led by Greylock Partners.

On March 3, 2026, Salesforce announced that Quip would be retired and that subscriptions would not be renewable after March 1, 2027.

== Features ==
The core of Quip provides word processing and spreadsheet functionality, accessible via the Web, an iOS app, and an Android app. Alongside all documents on Quip is a live-updating history of edits made, as well as the ability to highlight portions of a document and add comments, which facilitates collaboration. In 2015, Quip also added standalone chat rooms.

== Acquisition ==
In July 2016, Salesforce announced the acquisition of Quip for an estimated total of $750 million.

In January 2017, Quip acquired the three-person designer studio Unity & Variety, which had been developing a mobile productivity tool.

== See also ==
- ADONIS (software)
