= Bret Taylor =

American entrepreneur (born 1980)

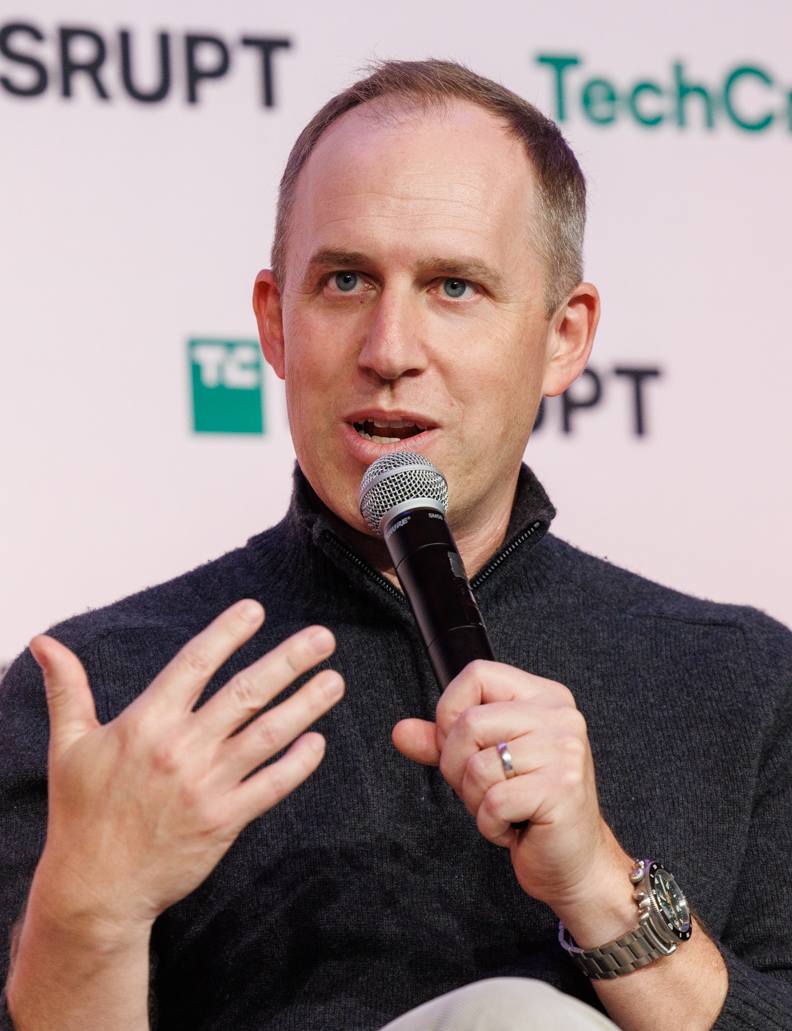
- Taylor in 2024
- Born: Bret Steven Taylor; 1980 (age 45–46); Oakland, California, U.S.
- Education: Stanford University (BS, MS)
- Occupations: Entrepreneur; Computer programmer
- Known for: Google Maps; FriendFeed; Quip
- Board member of: OpenAI; Shopify
- Spouse: Karen Padham (m. 2006)
- Children: 3
- Website: backchannel.org

Bret Steven Taylor (born 1980) is an American computer programmer and entrepreneur. He led the team that co-created Google Maps, was the chief technology officer (CTO) of Facebook (now Meta Platforms), chairman of Twitter, Inc.'s board of directors prior to its acquisition by Elon Musk, and co-CEO of Salesforce (alongside cofounder Marc Benioff). Taylor was also one of the founders of FriendFeed and the creator of collaborative productivity software Quip.

Taylor is the cofounder of AI startup Sierra, the chairman of OpenAI, and a board member of Shopify.

== Early life and education ==
Bret Taylor was born in Oakland, California, in 1980, primarily growing up in the East Bay. He graduated from Acalanes High School in Lafayette, California, in 1998. Taylor attended Stanford University, where he received his bachelor's and master's degrees in computer science in 2002 and 2003,. His parents and older sister also attended Stanford.

== Career ==
In 2003, Taylor was hired by Marissa Mayer as an associate product manager intern at Google. He led the team working on features such as Search by Location and Google Local, which were predecessors to Google Maps.

Taylor left Google in June 2007 to join venture capital firm Benchmark Capital as an entrepreneur-in-residence, where he and several former Google employees founded the social network web site FriendFeed. Taylor was CEO until August 2009, when it was acquired by Facebook Inc. (now known as Meta Platforms) for an estimated $50 million. The acquisition led to Facebook adopting the "Like" button from FriendFeed. After the acquisition, Taylor joined Facebook and became CTO in 2010.

In 2012, Taylor left Facebook to found Quip, a competitor to Google Docs. Quip was acquired by Salesforce in 2016. That year, Twitter, Inc. announced Taylor's appointment to their board of directors. In 2021, he became chairman of the company. He remained in the position until the entire board was dissolved following the acquisition of Twitter by Elon Musk in October 2022.

In 2017, Taylor became chief product officer at Salesforce. He was named president and chief operating officer two years later. As COO, Taylor led Salesforce's acquisition of Slack Technologies, which closed in 2021. He also led the creation of a system dubbed Customer 360 at Salesforce and started an associate product manager program at the company. In November 2021, Taylor was named vice chair and co-CEO at Salesforce. On November 30, 2022, it was announced that Taylor would be stepping down as co-CEO and vice chair at Salesforce at the end of January 2023. In February 2023, he co-founded an enterprise-focused artificial intelligence (AI) startup, Sierra, along with former Google executive Clay Bavor.

In November 2023, Taylor replaced Greg Brockman as chairman of OpenAI following the reconstitution of its board after Sam Altman was briefly ousted and reinstated as CEO. He has been on the board of Shopify since 2023.

In November 2025, Forbes recognized Taylor as a billionaire, primarily due to his roughly 25% stake in Sierra, valued at $10 billion at the time. The following month, he acquired an approximately 1% non‑controlling minority ownership stake in the San Francisco 49ers.

== Personal life ==
Taylor married Karen Padham in 2006, whom he met while working at Google. The couple has three children.
