= Jackson Marriott Downtown =

Historic site in downtown Jackson Ms

Coordinates: 32.301475°N 90.185215°W

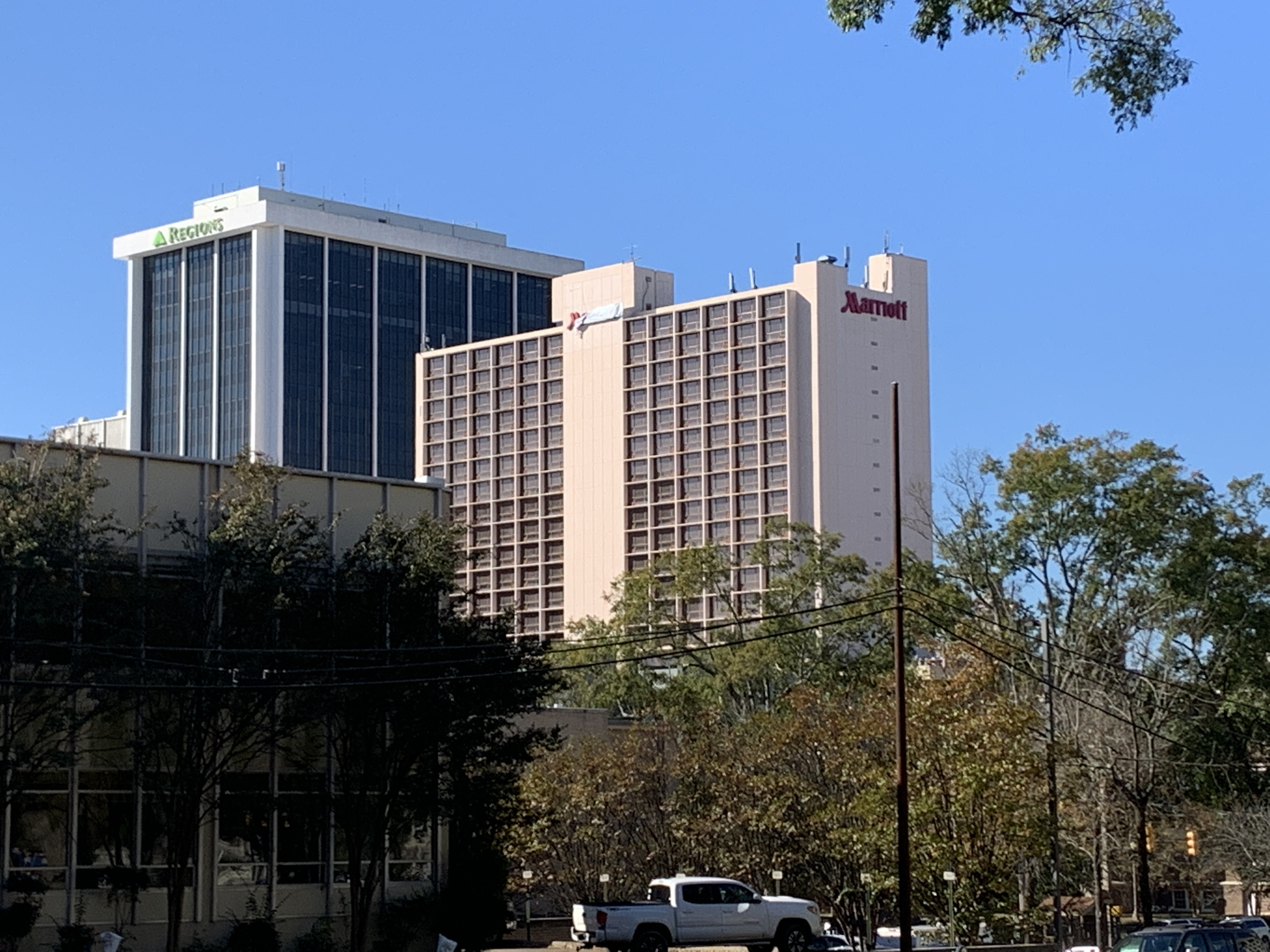
External view, November 2020

Jackson Marriott Downtown is a hotel in downtown Jackson, Mississippi, managed by Marriott International.

== History ==
The 303-room hotel opened in 1975 as a Holiday Inn. Since then, it has been sold and rebranded as Harvey Hotel in 1995, Crowne Plaza in 1997, and Marriott in 2004. In 2020, it was announced that the hotel would be renovated and rebranded to Delta by Marriott. During the renovations, it would operate under the name Jackson Downtown Convention Center Hotel. Later that year, the hotel temporarily closed due to the COVID-19 pandemic.
