= Capital One Tower (Louisiana) =

Former skyscraper in Lake Charles, Louisiana

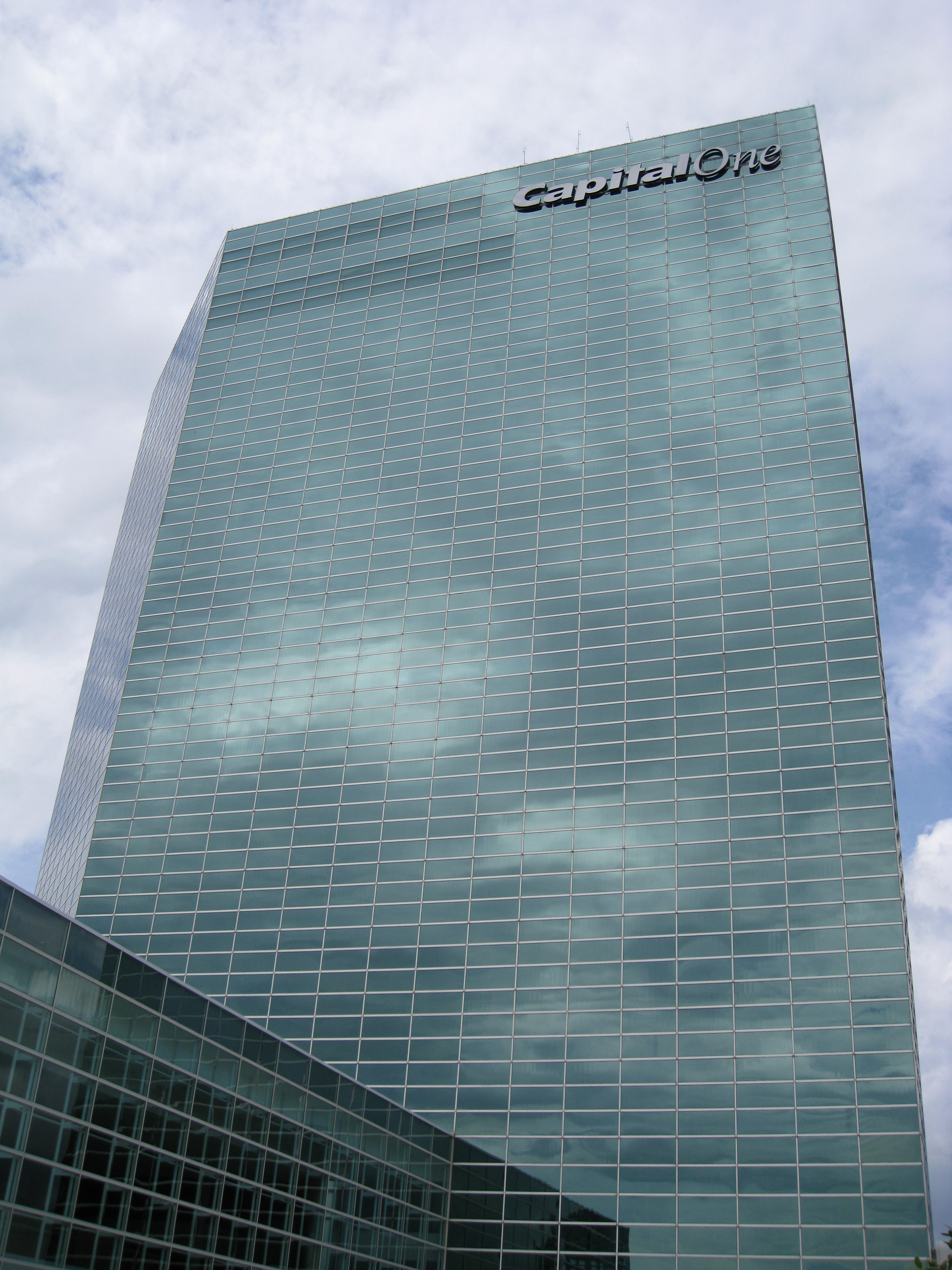
- Capital One Tower in 2012
- Former names: Hibernia Tower; Calcasieu Marine Tower

General information
- Status: Demolished
- Type: Banking; office space
- Location: Lake Charles, Louisiana
- Coordinates: 30.230763°N 93.219583°W
- Construction started: 1981
- Completed: 1982
- Opening: October 1, 1983
- Closed: August 26, 2020 (damaged by Hurricane Laura)
- Demolished: September 7, 2024
- Cost: $40 million
- Owner: Hertz Investment Group
- Operator: Hertz Investment Group

Height
- Antenna spire: 375 ft (114.3 meters)
- Roof: 314 ft (95.7 meters)

Technical details
- Floor count: 22
- Lifts/elevators: 8

Design and construction
- Architect: Lloyd Jones Brewer Associates
- Structural engineer: Miner-Dederick; F. Miller and Sons

Website
- https://web.archive.org/web/20100330061108/http://www.hertzgroup.com/capital_one_tower.html#

The Capital One Tower was a skyscraper located in Lake Charles, Louisiana, USA. It was the tallest building in the city until its demolition in 2024 due to damage by Hurricane Laura and Hurricane Delta. It was a dominant feature of the downtown skyline.

The building was designed by Lloyd Jones Brewer Associates of Houston and was constructed by Miner-Dederick of Houston and F. Miller and Sons of Lake Charles at a cost of $40 million. Construction began in March 1981 with groundbreaking in January 1982. The building was opened in 1983 and stood 22 stories and 375 feet (114 m) tall with 400,000 square feet (37,000 m^{2}) of space. The four-acre lot included an attached parking garage.

The building was originally called the CM Tower, for Calcasieu Marine National Bank, then renamed the Hibernia Tower after Hibernia National Bank purchased Calcasieu Marine. It was then changed to Capital One Tower after Capital One Bank acquired Hibernia in 2005.

Badly damaged by Hurricane Laura in August 2020, the tower stood empty until it was demolished in September 2024.

== Facilities ==
At 22 floors, the tower dominated the Lake Charles skyline, with the City Club restaurant on the top floor offering panoramic views. It housed many professional offices.

== Floor navigation ==
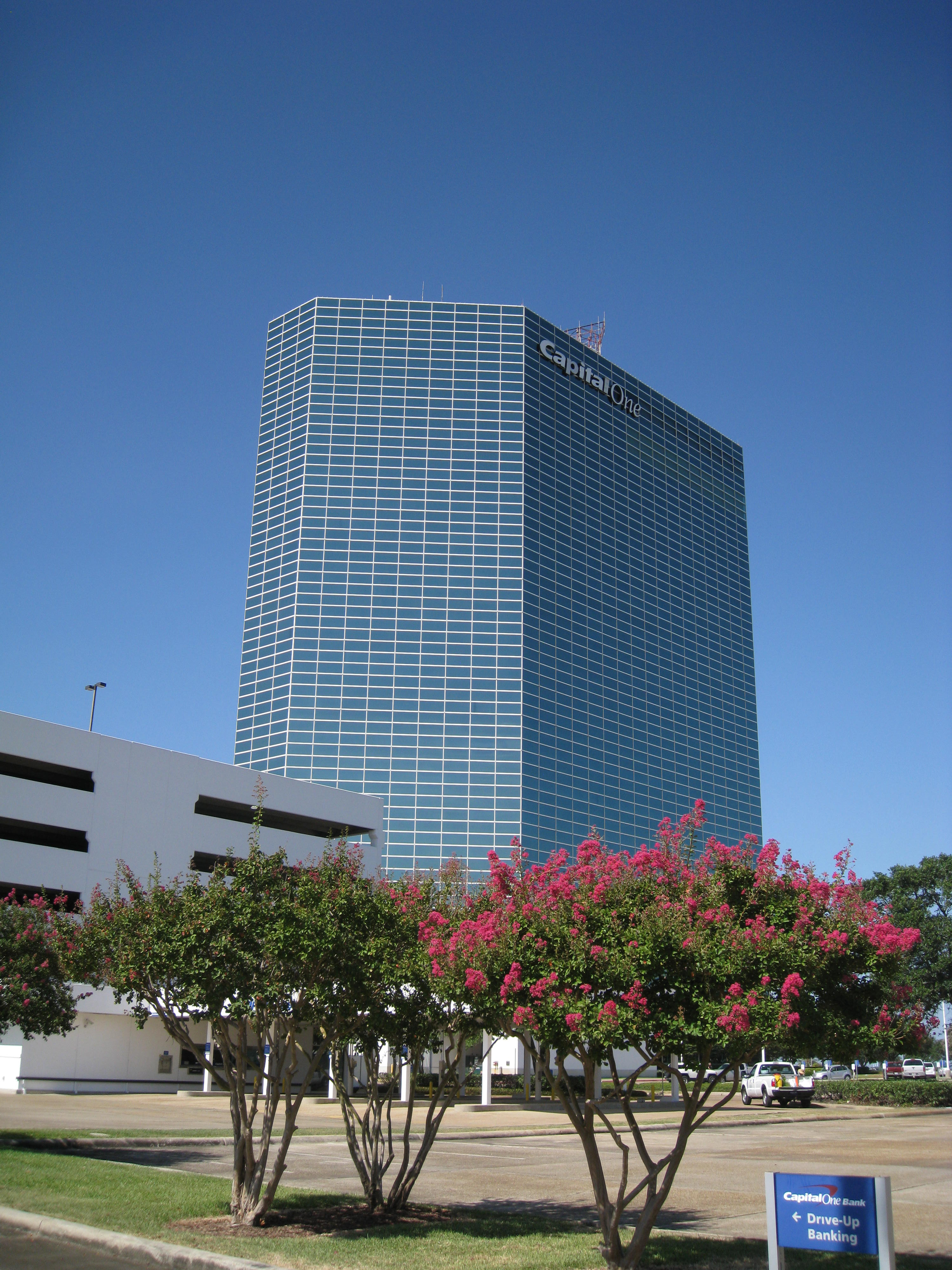
Capital One Tower in 2015

Two escalators in the atrium (one up and one down) served as access between floor 1 (ground floor) and floor 2 near the bank area.

Eight passenger elevators provided access to the upper floors and were grouped in two banks of four, with each bank having two cars facing each other linked by a hall. The west bank served floors 2, 15-21, and the eastmost two cars also served floor 1. Access to these elevators from floor 1 was inside the north entrance behind the security desk. The east bank of elevators served floors 2–14. A stairway behind each elevator bank also provided access to all floors, as did a freight elevator.

A walkway bridge connected floor 2 of the tower to floor 3 of the parking garage. Two passenger elevators and two stairways in the parking garage served floors 1-5 of the garage.

== Hurricane damage ==
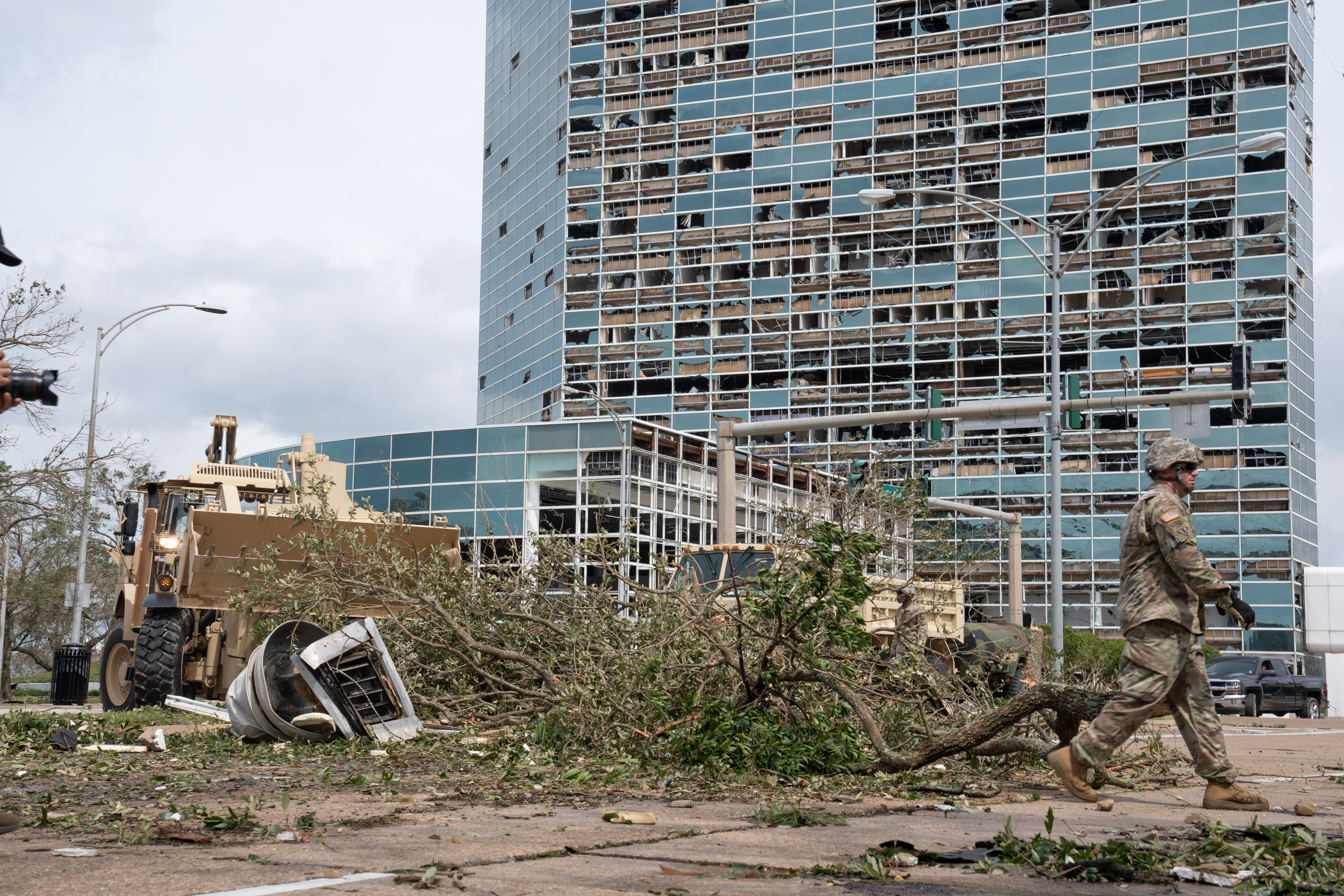
The damaged tower in the aftermath of Hurricane Laura

The tower was built with "hurricane-proof" glass, but in 2005 it sustained heavy damage to its atrium and several upper floors during Hurricane Rita, which made landfall as a Category 3 hurricane. In 2007, the facility underwent major repairs and security upgrades such as the addition of ballistic protection to the exterior glass. The reconstruction of the lower floors and the renovations of the atrium, tower facade, and major tenant spaces were designed and project-managed by Vincent-Shows Architects of Sulphur.

The tower was significantly damaged again in August 2020 by Category 4 Hurricane Laura. The building lost the majority of its windows, and the south-facing side was destroyed. In October 2020, Hurricane Delta further damaged the boarded-up building. The tower was left vacant and in 2023, the city gave Hertz Investment Group, who had acquired the building in June 2007, a deadline of November 2024 to either repair or demolish it. Hertz reached a settlement with their insurers and offered the building for sale, but it did not find a buyer.

== Demolition ==
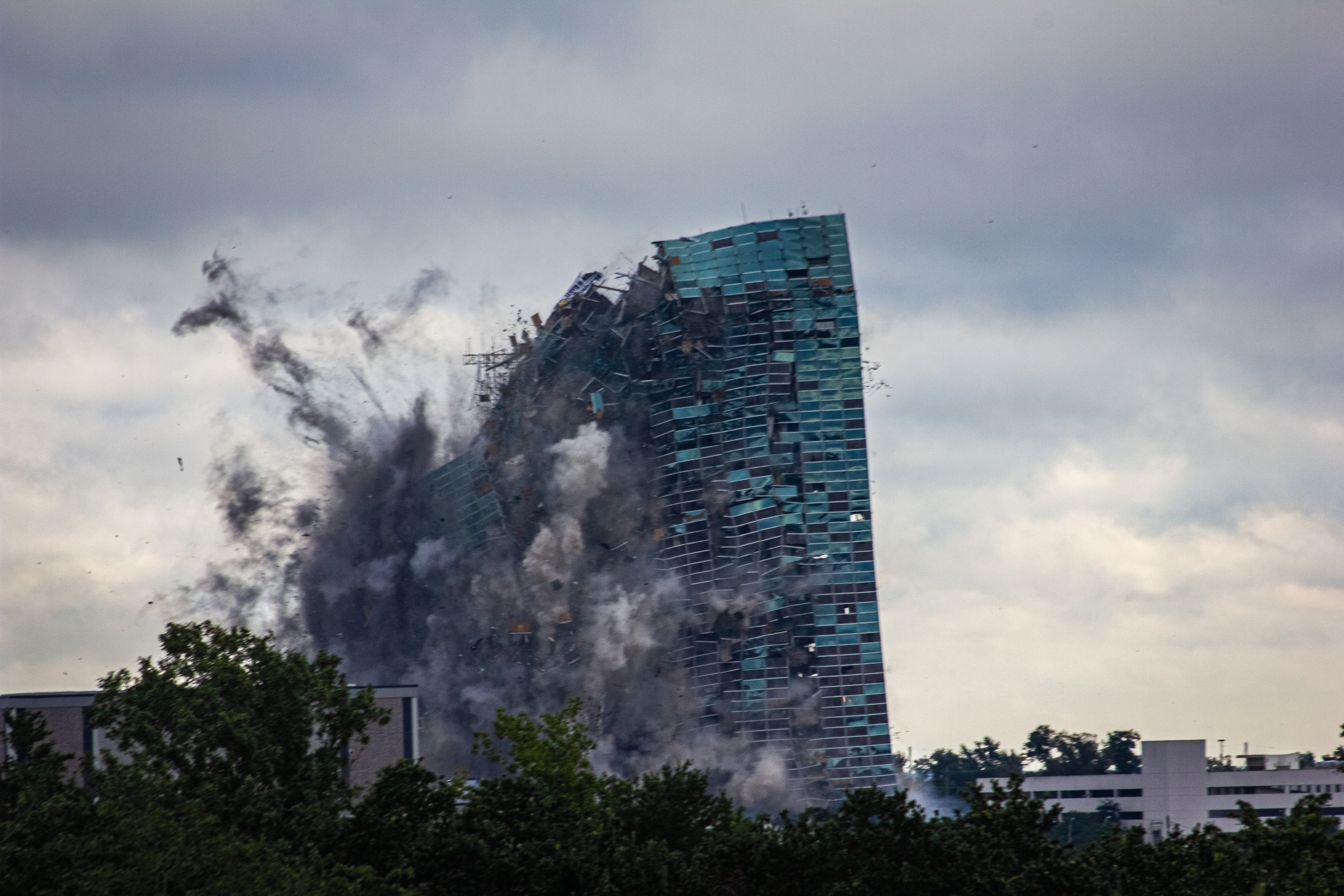
Demolition of the tower in 2024

In early 2024, the city announced that Capital One Tower would be demolished by "late August or early September". Mayor Nic Hunter said of the demolition that "It's time to move on". The skyscraper was imploded on September 7, 2024.
