= One Jackson Place =

Coordinates: 32.300835°N 90.186350°W

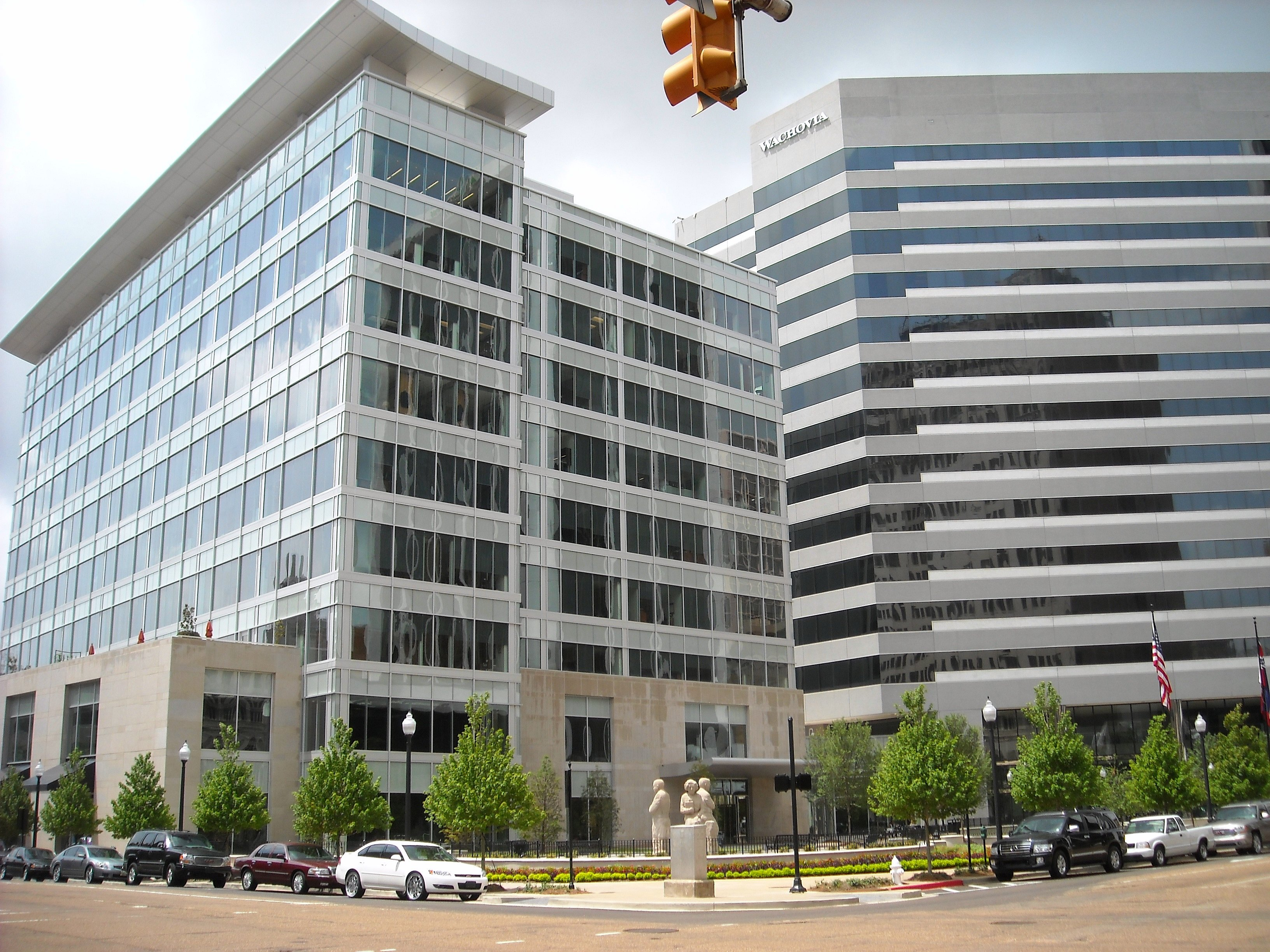

General information
- Type: Office
- Location: 188 East Capitol Street, Jackson, Mississippi
- Completed: 1987
- Owner: Hertz Investment Group

Technical details
- Floor count: 14

One Jackson Place is a high-rise office building in Jackson, Mississippi, United States. It was designed in the modernist architectural style, and it was completed in 1987. It is the 20th tallest building in Jackson. As of 2015, it is owned by the Hertz Investment Group, chaired by Zev Hertz.
