= Steven Nightingale =

Author

- Born: Reno, Nevada, U.S.
- Education: Stanford University
- Occupation: Author
- Spouse: Lucy
- Children: 1

Steven Nightingale is an author of books of poetry, novels, and essays.

== Personal life ==
Steven Nightingale was born in Reno, Nevada. He later studied literature, religion, and computer science at Stanford University. He and his family (including his wife Lucy and their daughter Gabriella) moved to Granada, Spain, in 2001, after buying a home in the Albayzín, one of the oldest neighborhoods in the city.

== Writing ==
Nightingale is the author of two novels, six books of sonnets, and a book about the city of Granada, Spain. His poetry has been included in many anthologies, and he has taught poetry in more than fifty schools and universities.

His poetry was first published in 1983, in Coevolution Quarterly. His first novel, The Lost Coast, and its sequel, The Thirteenth Daughter of the Moon, followed. His six books of poetry begin with the limited edition Cartwheels, followed by Planetary Tambourine, and four more collections of ninety-nine sonnets each. In 2015, he released Granada: A Pomegranate in the Hand of God. The book describes the move of the author and his family to the city of Granada, Spain, and goes on to address the history of gardens and of the Albayzín, the extraordinary history of Al-Andalus, the sacred geometry in Islamic tile work, the work of the Sufis, the history of flamenco, and the life and poetry of Federico García Lorca.

=== Selected publications ===
- The Hot Climate of Promises and Grace: 64 Stories, 2016.
- Granada: Pomegranate in the Hand of God. Counterpoint Press. 2015.
- The Wings of What You Say. Black Rock Press, Rainshadow Editions, 2013.
- The Golden Pilgrimage. Black Rock Press, Rainshadow Editions, 2011.
- The Light in Them Is Permanent. Black Rock Press, Rainshadow Editions, 2010.
- Cinnamon Theologies. Black Rock Press, Rainshadow Editions, 2013. 2008
- The Planetary Tambourine. Black Rock Press, Rainshadow Editions, 2006.
- Cartwheels. Black Rock Press, Limited Edition, 2003.
- Four Poems. Neon, a publication of the Nevada Arts Council. 2003
- “The Story of the Machine That Makes Paradise,” and a prose poem, “Comfort.” In Set in Stone, An Anthology of Great Basin Writing.”
- “On Education.” In Touchstone, publication of the Nevada Humanities Committee.
- “Haroun and the Sea of Stories” by Salman Rushdie. Column for the Reno-Gazette Journal. 1998
- “The Odyssey.” Homer, in the Walter Shewring translation. Column for the Reno-Gazette Journal. 1998
- “On A Hundred Years of Solitude.” By Gabriel Garcia Marquez. Column for the Reno-Gazette Journal. 1998
- “The Fall.” By Albert Camus. Column for the Reno-Gazette Journal. 1998
- “On Plato’s Apology.” Column for the Reno-Gazette Journal. 1997
- The Thirteenth Daughter of the Moon. St. Martin's Press, New York. 1996.
- The Lost Coast, St. Martin's Press, New York. 1995.

=== Selected public presentations ===
2015

- For Granada: A Pomegranate in the Hand of God: presentations at six bookstores: Mrs. Dalloways, Sundance Books, Diesel, Books, Inc; Copperfield's, and the Bay Area Book Festival, as well as a talk and participation on a panel in the Interfaith Chapel in San Francisco.
- In England, in the summer, a conversation with Robert Irwin at LRB Books in London; a BBC interview, and an interview with ABC Australia.
- Also, an NPR interview for 25 public radio stations in New York and Massachusetts.
- Talk Radio Europe - 5/13/2015
- Steven Nightingale: Granada
- ABC Radio Australia - 7/4/2015
- Sense of Place: Steven Nightingale on Granada
- London Review Bookshop - 7/16/2016
- Granada: The Light of Andalucía - A conversation with Steven Nightingale and Robert Irwin
- BBC World Service Radio - Up All Night - 7/20/2015
- WAMC Northeast Public Radio - 8/20/15
- Alan Chartock In Conversation with Poet and Author Steven Nightingale about his latest book Granada: A Pomegranate in the Hand of God.

2014

- To Interfaith Power and Light, San Francisco, CA: “The Uses of Literature in a Time of Environmental Crisis.”
- Sundance Books, Reno, NV: A Selection of Proverbs from the Last Ten Centuries,” and a reading of sonnets from The Wings of What You Say.”
- Fort Mason, San Francisco; and two Private Venues: A reading of sonnets from The Wings of What You Say.

2013

- Teaching at Castilleja School, Palo Alto, California: “Poetry and Practical Life.”
- Sundance Books, Reno, Nevada: Presentation for National Poetry Month.
- Teaching at Pescadero Elementary School, California: “The Secret of Poetry.”

2011

- Private Reading, at the house of Reverend Canon Sally Bingham of Grace Cathedral: The Golden Pilgrimage.
- Sundance Books, Reno, Nevada: The Golden Pilgrimage.
- The Nevada Museum of Art, Reno, Nevada: “On Beauty and Philanthropy.”
- Moe's Books, Berkeley, CA: The Golden Pilgrimage.
- Teaching, the Carey Elementary School, San Mateo, California: “Why All of You Are Poets.”

=== Past years ===
Sonnets and Blues: an appearance with blues impresario Al Blake. The Churchill Arts Council.

West Coast Live, A National Public Radio Show: three appearances for the novels and for poetry jams.

“Reflections on the Human Spirit: An evening of words and music.” At the First United Methodist Church.

“Magical Realism in the Great Basin.” A benefit for the Friends of the University Library.

The Great Basin Book Festival, seven readings over various years.

For Thirteen Daughter of the Moon: In addition to television appearances and radio interviews, Presentations in Nevada at the Brewery Arts Center, Barnes and Noble, Sundance Books, and the University of Nevada, Las Vegas. In California, presentations at A Clean Well-Lighted Place for Books in San Francisco, Printer's Ink in Palo Alto, Barnes and Noble in Berkeley, and Elliott Bay Books in Seattle.

For The Lost Coast: Presentations in Nevada Sundance Books, the University of Nevada, Reno, and Great Basin Books, in addition to television and radio interviews. Presentations in California at Keplers Books in Menlo Park, Black Oak Books at Berkeley, Book Soup Bistro in Los Angeles, and A Clean Well-Lighted Place for Books in Larkspur and San Francisco. Also presentations at Eliot Bay Books in Seattle, Barnes and Noble in Tacoma and New York City, and the Tattered Cover in Denver.
