= Walter Sillers State Office Building =

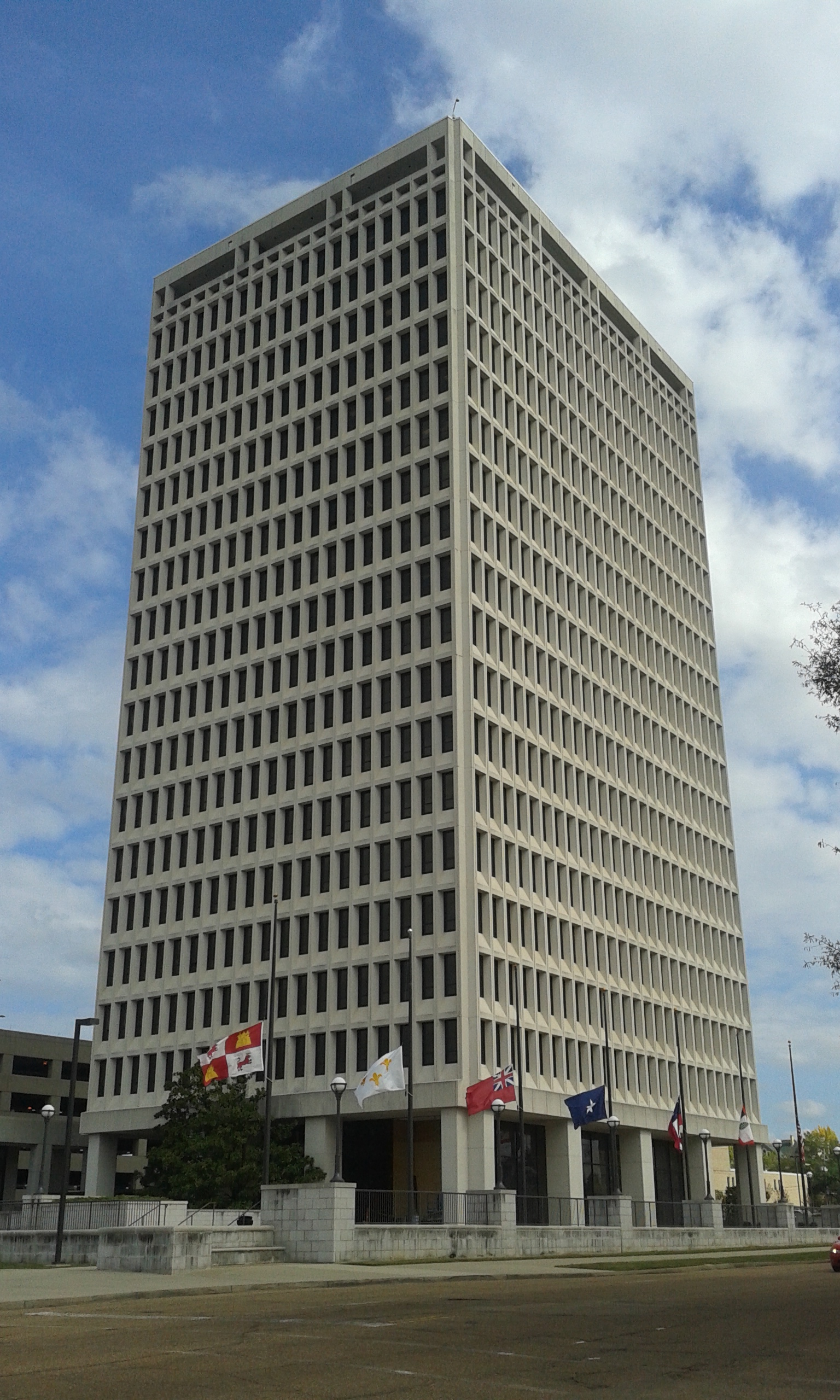

- Location in Mississippi Walter Sillers State Office Building (the United States)
- Etymology: Walter Sillers Jr.

General information
- Type: Government
- Location: 550 High Street, Jackson, Mississippi
- Coordinates: 32.30522°N 90.18095°W
- Construction started: 1970
- Completed: 1972

Technical details
- Floor count: 20

Design and construction
- Architect: Charles G. Mitchell

The Walter Sillers State Office Building is a high-rise government office building in Jackson, Mississippi, USA. It was designed in the International Style and built from 1970 to 1972. It is the fifth-tallest building in Jackson. It is named after the politician Walter Sillers Jr.

== See also ==
- List of tallest buildings in Jackson, Mississippi
