= Regions Bank Building (Jackson, Mississippi) =

Skyscraper in Jackson, Mississippi, US

Coordinates: 32.300194°N 90.185629°W

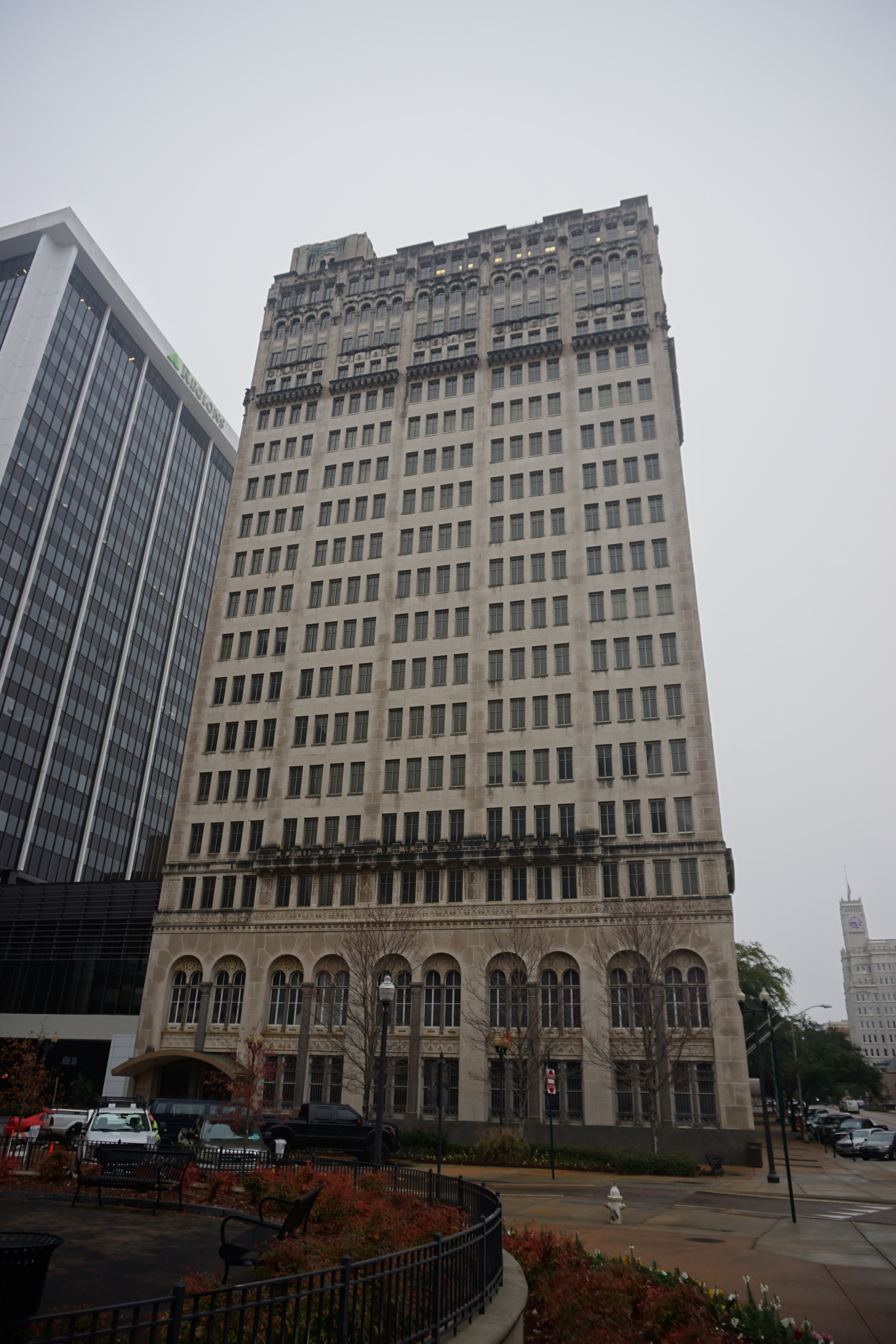
- Interactive map of the Regions Bank Building area

General information
- Type: Commercial
- Location: 200 East Capitol Street, Jackson, Mississippi
- Completed: 1929
- Owner: Hertz Investment Group

Technical details
- Floor count: 18

The Regions Bank Building is a historic high-rise building in Jackson, Mississippi, USA. It was designed in the Renaissance Revival architectural style, and it was completed in 1929. It is the third tallest building in Jackson. As of 2015, it is owned by the Hertz Investment Group, chaired by Judah Hertz.
