= Warren Nelson =

American businessman (born 1950)

Warren James Nelson III
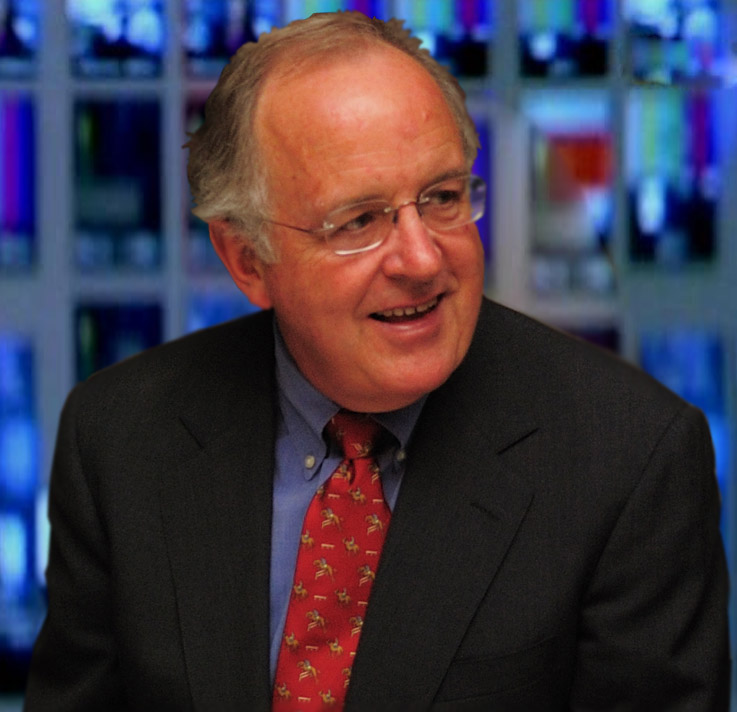
- Nelson in 2010
- Born: September 16, 1950 (age 75)
- Education: Cal Poly, San Luis Obispo University of California at Berkeley MBA
- Occupation: Businessman
- Children: 1
- Website: Nelson's Management Bio from BNK; Nelson's Management Bio from Nelcal

Warren James Nelson III (born September 16, 1950) is an American businessman, and the president of Nelcal Private Equity Investments LP.

He is the former vice president and Chief Financial Officer of BNK Petroleum. He held this position from March 2010 to May 2013.

Nelson is also the Founder and Director of AmeriTies, the primary supplier of railroad ties to Union Pacific Railroad. Amerities has operations in California, Oregon, Arkansas and Oklahoma. The company was founded in 2003 when it purchased assets from Kerr-McGee and was expanded in 2010.

He had previously was CEO and President of Huntway Refining, a California based, NYSE-traded oil refinery. Under his leadership Huntway was sold to Valero Energy in 2001 for approximately $78MM.

He has also worked as acting CFO of Smith International, interim CFO of Venoco, and started his career at Price Waterhouse (now PwC) after receiving his MBA from UC Berkeley and his BS from Cal Poly SLO. Mr. Nelson lives with his wife Maria in Camarillo, California, a suburb outside of Los Angeles.
