= Regions Plaza (Atlanta) =

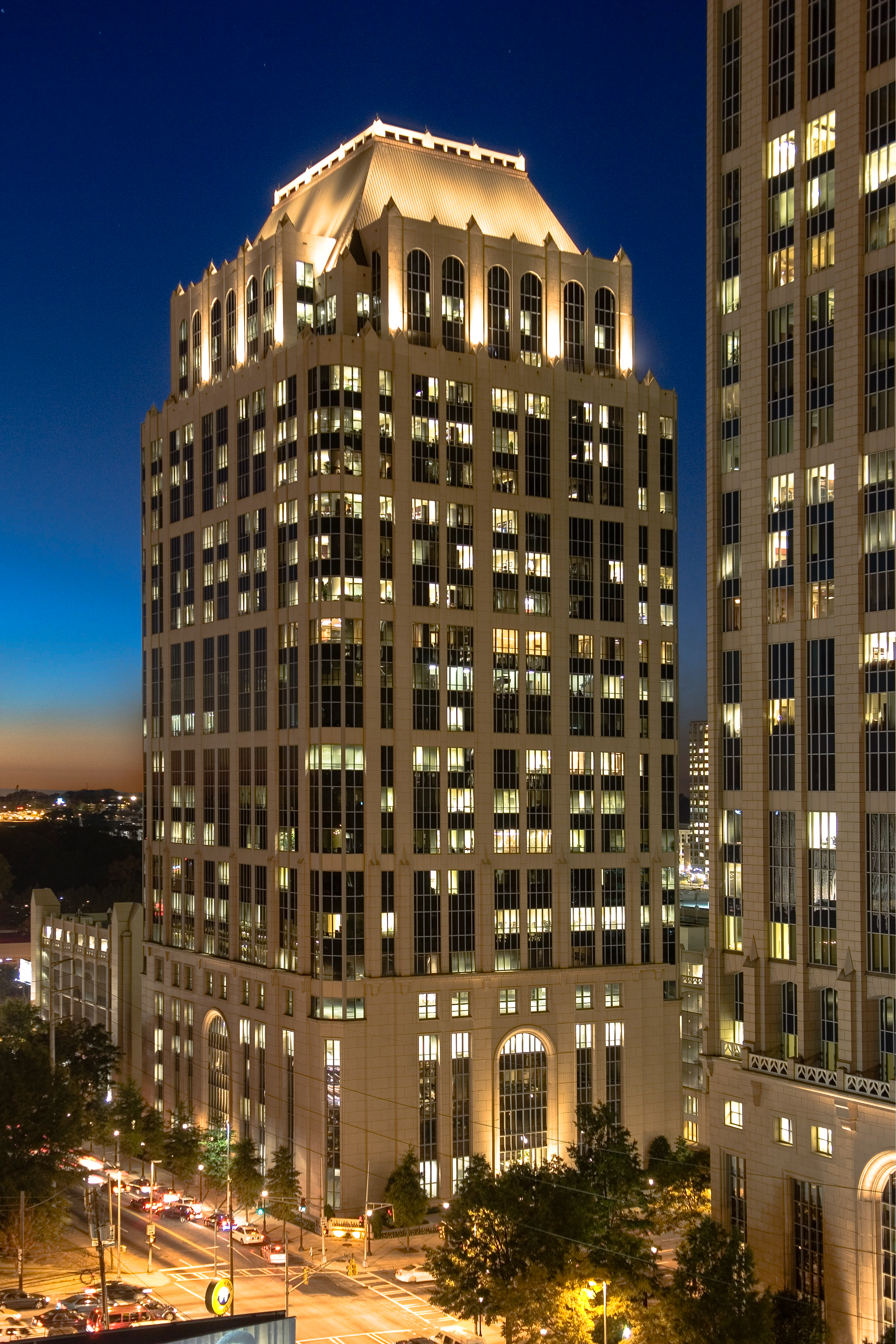
- Regions Plaza
- Interactive map of the Regions Plaza area

General information
- Status: Completed
- Type: Office
- Location: 1180 West Peachtree Street, Atlanta, 30309
- Coordinates: 33.7870°N 84.3882°W
- Construction started: 2000
- Completed: 2001; 25 years ago
- Opening: 2001
- Owner: Prudential

Technical details
- Floor count: 24
- Floor area: 500,953 sq ft (46,540.1 m^{2})

Design and construction
- Architect: Smallwood, Reynolds, Stewart, Stewart
- Main contractor: The Beck Group

Regions Plaza is a 24-floor office high-rise located at 1180 West Peachtree Street in Atlanta, Georgia. The building was completed in 2001 and renovated in 2014. The building serves as the Georgia headquarters for Regions Financial Corporation.

The building is located on the corner of 14th Street and West Peachtree Street which is the latitude line that defines the center of Midtown. Its parking garage entrance is located at 1217 Spring Street.

Prior to 2013, the building was known as Atlantic Center Plaza.

== Tenants ==
- Regions Financial Corporation
- Holland & Knight LLP
- Salesloft
- Taipei Economic and Cultural Office in Atlanta
