= Regions Plaza (Jackson, Mississippi) =

Coordinates: 32.300784°N 90.185425°W

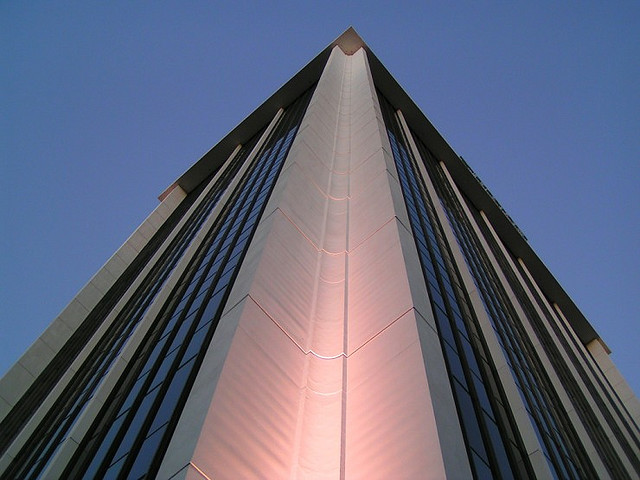
- Interactive map of the Regions Plaza area

General information
- Type: Office
- Location: 210 East Capitol Street, Jackson, Mississippi
- Completed: 1975
- Owner: Hertz Investment Group

Height
- Roof: 318 ft (97 m)

Technical details
- Floor count: 22

The Regions Plaza is a high-rise office building in Jackson, Mississippi, United States. It was designed in the modernist architectural style, and it was completed in 1975. It is the tallest building in Jackson. As of 2026, it is owned by the Hertz Investment Group, chaired by Judah Hertz.
