= Hertz Investment Group =

American real estate investment company

- Industry: Real estate
- Founded: 1977; 49 years ago
- Founder: Judah Hertz
- Headquarters: Woodland Hills, California
- Key people: Zev Hertz (CEO and chairman)
- Website: www.hertzgroup.com

Hertz Investment Group is a real estate investment company. The company was founded by Judah Hertz in 1977.

== Overview ==
In 2003, the company acquired four buildings in New Orleans, three from Simon Property Group at a cost of $36 million.

The company sold The Hyatt at Capitol Square in Columbus, Ohio for $19.5 million in 2011. In 2012, the company defaulted on a loan secured by an office building in Kansas City. The company acquired Bridgewater Place, an office building in Grand Rapids, Michigan in 2013.

In 2014, the company offered the Gateway Center in Pittsburgh for sale. In 2015, the company acquired 6 office buildings in the Southeast United States for $417.4 million.

In 2016, the company acquired 4 office towers in Indianapolis, Milwaukee, and Cleveland totaling more than 3 million square feet from Sam Zell's Equity Commonwealth for $416.9 million.

During the COVID-19 pandemic, the company's investment in office space became a liability, as remote work became increasingly prevalent. On August 27, 2020, Judah Hertz stepped down as chairman and CEO. His son Zev Hertz took over five days later. In 2021, the company began investing in residential real estate and apartment buildings.

In 2020, Capital One Tower in Lake Charles, Louisiana, owned by Hertz Investment Group, was severely damaged in hurricanes Laura and Delta. Hertz began litigation with its insurance company over the cost of repairs. In mid-2022, almost two years after Hurricane Laura, the City of Lake Charles declared the office tower a blighted property in an attempt to force Hertz Investment Group to begin repairs to the building, and then joined the lawsuit between Hertz Investment Group and the insurance provider to protect the city from having to pay the estimated $20 million cost of demolition if Hertz abandoned the building. Hertz settled the lawsuit the following year but was unable to sell the building, and it was demolished in 2024.

In 2024, the Regions Tower in Shreveport, Louisiana had unpaid electric and water bills. The building was posted with cutoff notices after the electric bill reached $455,000 and the water bill was outstanding at $21,000.
