= Preservation Resource Center =

Historic buildings preservation organization in New Orleans, United States

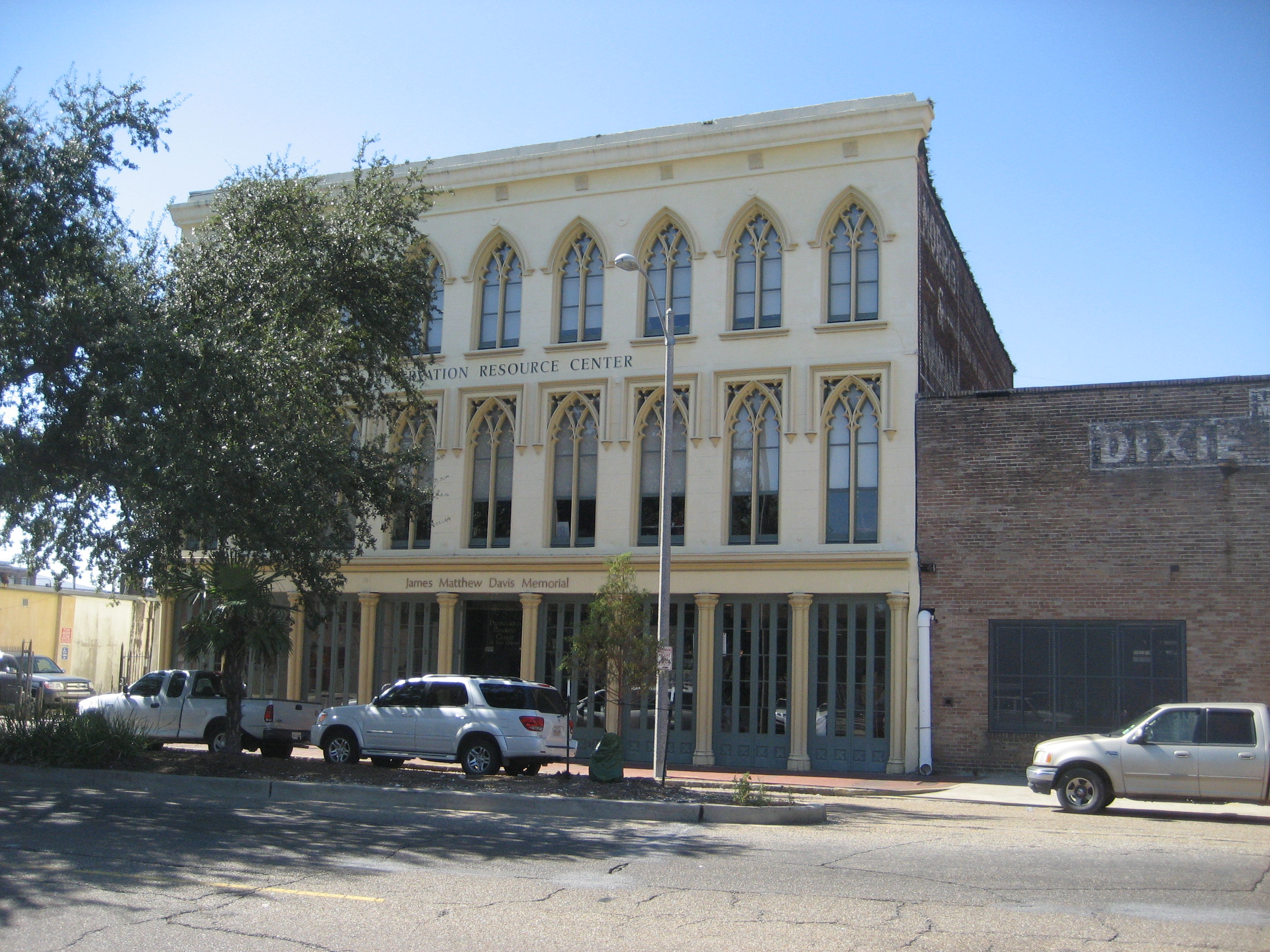
New Orleans: Preservation Resource Center, Tchoupitoulas Street, Old Warehouse District

The Preservation Resource Center is a non-profit organization which promotes the historic preservation of buildings and architecture in New Orleans.

== Mission ==
New Orleans is a city famous for its architecture. From the townhouse apartments of the French Quarter to the shotgun houses of Uptown, New Orleans features a wide array of architectural styles, styles which are often unique to the city.

However, New Orleans has suffered from the same problems with sinking property values and urban decline as other major cities. Many historic structures have been threatened with demolition. Even the now famous French Quarter was once a neglected immigrant ghetto in the early 20th century, which was also threatened with destruction. In the 1960s, there had been a serious attempt by the federal government to demolish the French Quarter's scenic riverfront and replace it with an interstate highway.

The Preservation Resource Center promotes the protection of historic architecture in New Orleans, which it believes are vital to the economy, culture, and aesthetics of the city. The organization also advocates the involvement of citizens and communities in the restoration of historic neighborhoods and buildings. Most of the organization's programs are directed toward several target historic neighborhoods in the city.

== Organization ==
The Preservation Resource Center was founded in 1974. It is governed by a president and a board of directors. As of 2006, the Preservation has 21 full-time and part-time employees and annual budget of $1.4 million. Its numerous outreach and renovation projects rely on federal grants, donations, and a community of volunteers and members.

The offices of the Preservation Resource Center are located in the historic Leeds-Davis Building in the Warehouse District, near the National World War II Museum and Ernest N. Morial Convention Center. The building was built by the noted New Orleans architect James Gallier in 1853, during the antebellum period of New Orleans history. The structure features a restored cast-iron Gothic Revival facade. Preservation purchased the Leeds-Davis Building in March 1998, and financed an extensive modernization and renovation of the structure for the next two years. It moved into its new office on November 11, 2000. The building features a classroom and a showroom on the first floor. The office is located at 923 Tchoupitoulas Street, New Orleans, Louisiana 70130.

== Activities ==
=== Advocacy ===
The Preservation Resource Center is politically active in supporting legislation which favors historic preservation and works to prevent legislation which favors unrestricted development. In the past, the organization has lobbied for legislation which saved the federal tax credit for historic rehabilitation, created a property tax abatement for home renovation, and established zoning measures which favored historic neighborhoods and properties. The organization frequently joins neighborhood associations in city planning sessions with the New Orleans City Council and other government agencies. It has been involved in legal cases which have prevented the demolition of specific houses and neighborhoods.

=== Education ===
The Preservation Resource Center sponsors several events and information workshops for homeowners each year. Many of these seminars are held in the organization's office building, and they are open and free of charge to the general public. The organization also publishes material relating to the renovation of historic homes and buildings. The organization has a monthly magazine, Preservation in Print, which publicizes events relating to historic preservation, and features articles on historic neighborhoods and buildings.

=== Operation Comeback ===
Operation Comeback promotes the purchasing and renovation of vacant historic properties, instead of the demolition of existing structures and the construction of new buildings. Established in 1987, the original objective of the program was the revitalization of the Coliseum neighborhood in the Lower Garden District. Today, Operation Comeback helps prospective homeowners locate and purchase renovated historic houses throughout the city. The program also holds interviews with homeowners and helps them finance and organize renovation projects.

=== Rebuilding Together ===
Originally established as "Christmas in October" in 1988, Rebuilding Together is a neighborhood revitalization program which renovates the homes of elderly, low-income, disabled homeowners. Homeowners who own a historic house can apply to have their homes renovated, and the renovations are done at no cost to the homeowners. The program relies on volunteer labor and donated supplies to perform the renovations. Both skilled and unskilled labor are invited to join the program. The program differs from the New Orleans Habitat for Humanity in that the organization renovates existing homes instead of building new ones.

=== Hurricane Katrina ===
During Hurricane Katrina and Hurricane Rita, several historic New Orleans neighborhoods were flooded, and numerous historic buildings were severely damaged. Preservation Resource Center is currently assisting homeowners throughout the city repair their flood and wind-damaged homes.

== See also ==
- Buildings and architecture of New Orleans
- New Orleans neighborhoods
