= Gallery (New Orleans) =

Platform on a building supported by posts

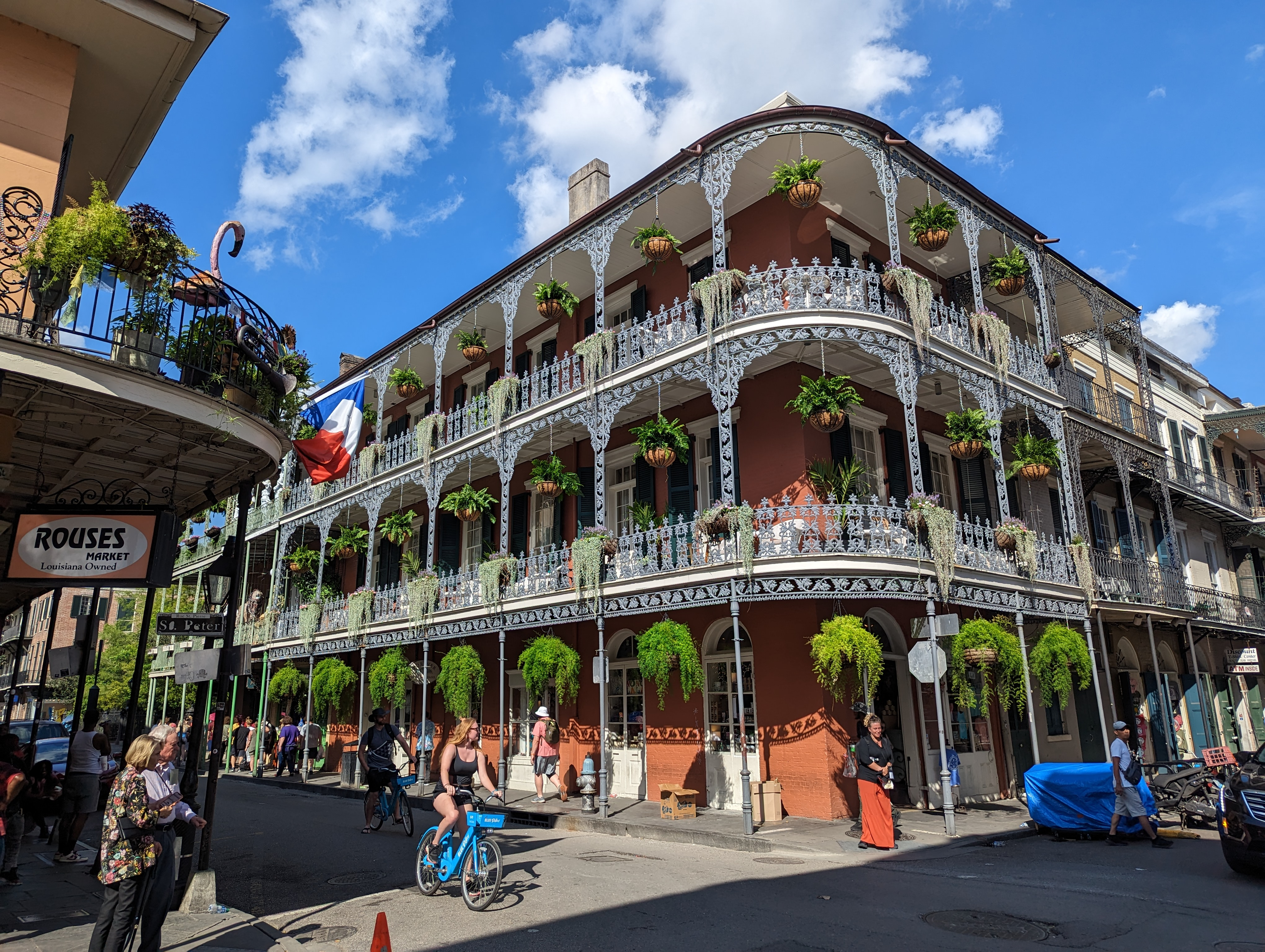
Double galleries at the LaBranche Buildings in the French Quarter

In New Orleans, a gallery is a wide platform projecting from the wall of a building supported by posts or columns. Galleries are typically constructed from cast iron (or wrought iron in older buildings) with ornate balusters, posts, and brackets.

The intricate iron balconies and galleries of the French Quarter are among the renowned icons of New Orleans.

== Terminology ==
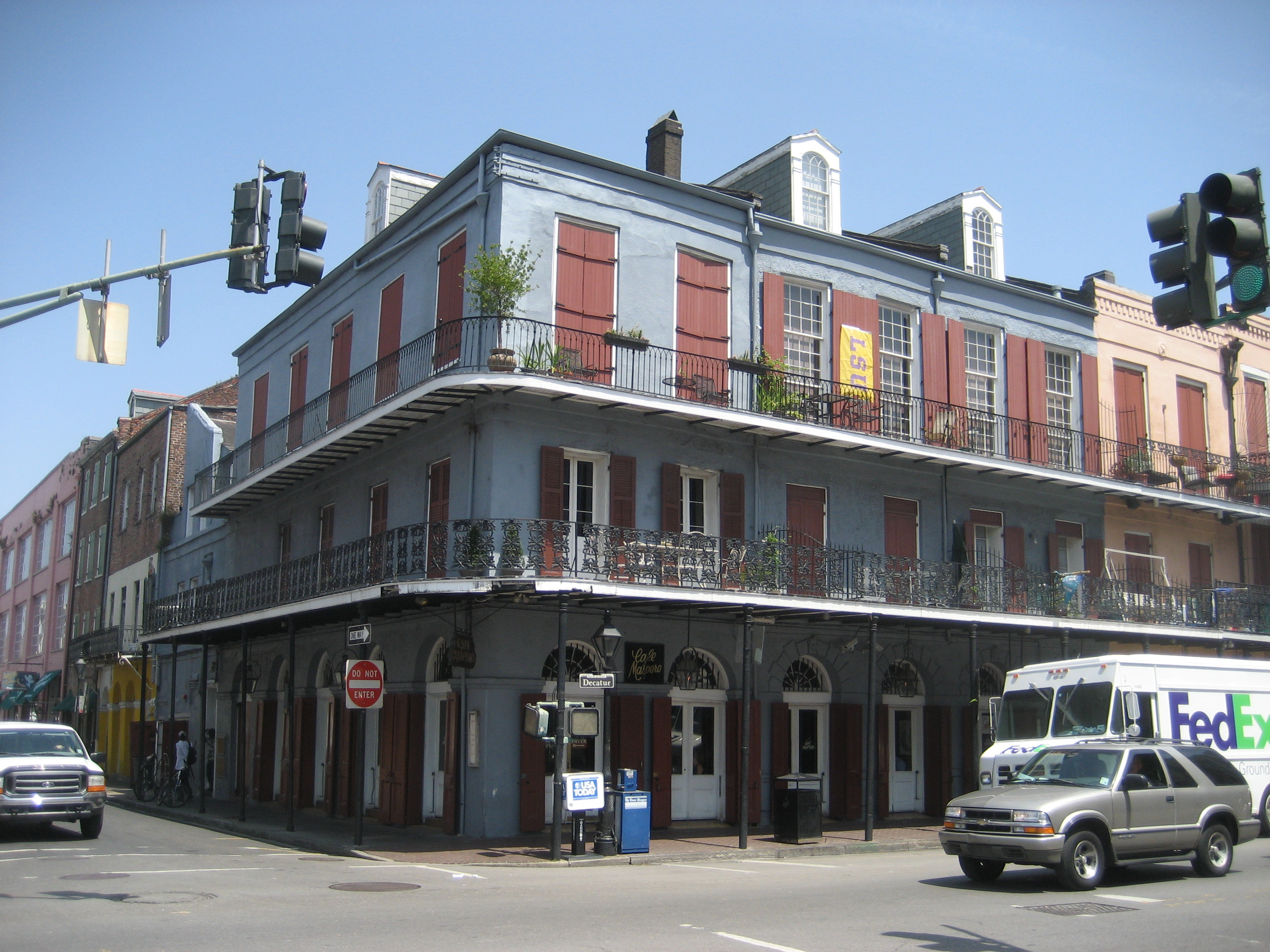
This townhouse on Decatur Street has a gallery on the second floor and a balcony on the third floor

The City of New Orleans provides specific definitions for platforms projecting from the face of the building, differentiating between balconies and galleries. Balconies typically have a projection width of up to 4 feet (1.2 m), lacking supporting posts and a roof structure. In contrast, galleries are platforms extending beyond property lines to cover the full width of the public sidewalk, supported by posts or columns at the street curb. Galleries may or may not include a roof cover.

The city employs the term "gallery" in various contexts. A side gallery refers to a porch on the side of a shotgun house, functioning as an exterior corridor. The term double gallery is applied to a specific house type called double-gallery house, incorporating galleries across the facade of both the first and second floors. These galleries are within the property line and are typically covered by the roof of the main house. The term triple gallery is similar but pertains to three-story buildings. When describing multi-level galleries attached to townhouses, the term double galleries is used for galleries that are attached to the second and third floors of a townhouse with supporting posts on the curb.

== History ==
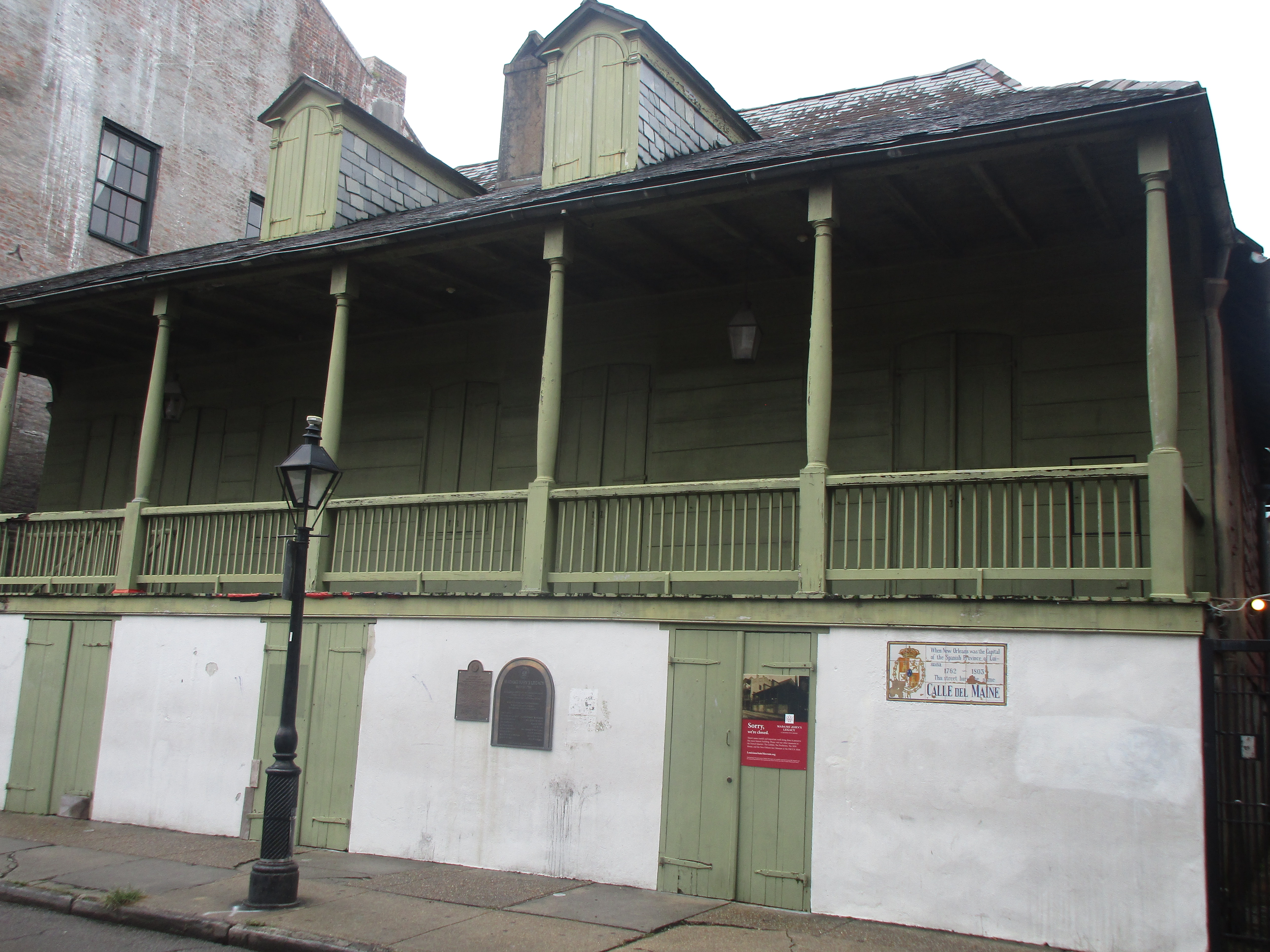
Madame John's Legacy with basement doors boarded up (white)

New Orleans was founded in early 1718 by the French as La Nouvelle-Orléans under the direction of Louisiana governor Jean-Baptiste Le Moyne de Bienville. During the early French settlement, houses were constructed in the Creole cottage style – simple, one-story structures with timber board walls. Local builders adapted the architecture to the tropical climate by adding wooden galleries with roof covers. These galleries served a dual purpose: providing protection from the elements and embracing the pleasant, airy designs influenced by the French style in the West Indies. Additionally, they functioned as a transition space between private and public areas.

In a 1731 plan, high hip-roof houses in New Orleans were spaced across city blocks, surrounded by gardens, and positioned with their front sides either directly at or near the sidewalk. Some of these houses featured full front galleries. An example of such house style with a raised basement can still be seen at Madame John's Legacy. Although the house was destroyed and rebuilt in 1788, it retained its original design from circa 1730. By the mid-18th century, New Orleans was transformed into a French village with picket-fenced gardens and wooden galleries.

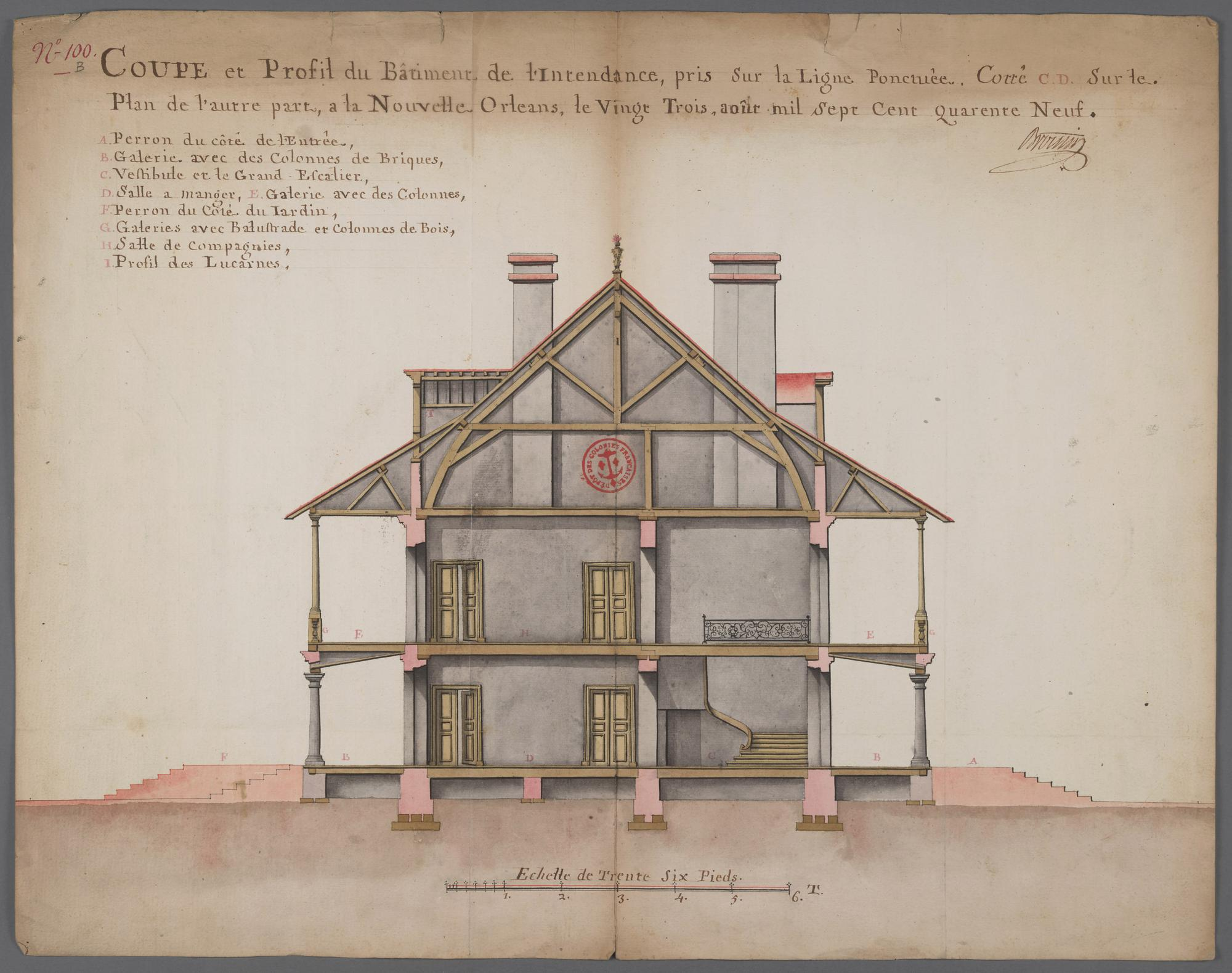
Section and profile drawing of the Intendance building

In 1749, Ignace François Broutin drew up the Intendance building plan, featuring a design with two-story galleries. This marked the earliest record of such a design in Louisiana, although the building was never constructed.

In 1763 following Britain's victory in the Seven Years' War, the French colony west of the Mississippi River – along with New Orleans – was ceded to the Spanish Empire as a secret provision of the 1762 Treaty of Fontainebleau. The Spanish considered the Province of Louisiana a buffer zone to protect their Mexican colony and did not invest significantly in transforming local culture in New Orleans, known to the Spanish as La Nueva Orleans. By 1765, almost every building exhibited a front gallery on the first floor, and many two-story buildings showcased two-story galleries.

Major fires in 1788 and 1794 completely destroyed a large number of houses built during the French period. In response, the Spanish administration implemented stricter building codes, prohibiting timber construction and wooden shingles. New buildings were required to be constructed with fire-resistant stucco-covered brick and clay tiles. However, there is no evidence of Spanish architects involved in the reconstruction. During the Spanish period, population in New Orleans increased significantly. To accommodate the growing population, new two and three-story masonry and stucco townhouses were constructed, maintaining the continuity of French colonial architecture. An influx of refugees from the French colony of Saint-Domingue (now Haiti) during the Haitian Revolution, beginning in 1791, brought surveyors and architects to New Orleans, reinforcing French architectural traditions. But certain architectural elements were borrowed from the Spanish, such as arched openings on the ground floor, courtyards at the rear of the buildings, and wrought-iron balconies on building facades. The earliest recorded attempt to extend a balcony to cover the entire sidewalk occurred in December 1789. Don Joseph de Orue y Garbea petitioned the Spanish Cabildo for a permit to build a gallery for his house, and the permit was granted.

On residential streets like Royal Street, shops were established on the ground floor, while living quarters were situated on the upper floors of Creole townhouses. This style echoed Creole cottages, characterized by the absence of hallways, and rooms were used for multiple purposes. The confined living spaces prompted residents to seek relief. These townhouses were constructed with continuous balconies featuring hand-wrought iron railings on both street and courtyard sides, providing not only architectural charm but also facilitating the entry of light and fresh air.

The installation of wrought-iron cantilevered or bracketed balconies presented new demands for blacksmiths during that period, lasting until 1825 when Leeds Iron Foundry introduced cast iron technology with a faster build process to New Orleans. This innovation allowed iron to be molded, enabling the creation of highly decorative patterns and intricate filigree that gained popularity in the 19th century. Subsequently, the combination of wrought iron and cast iron railings in balconies started to emerge.

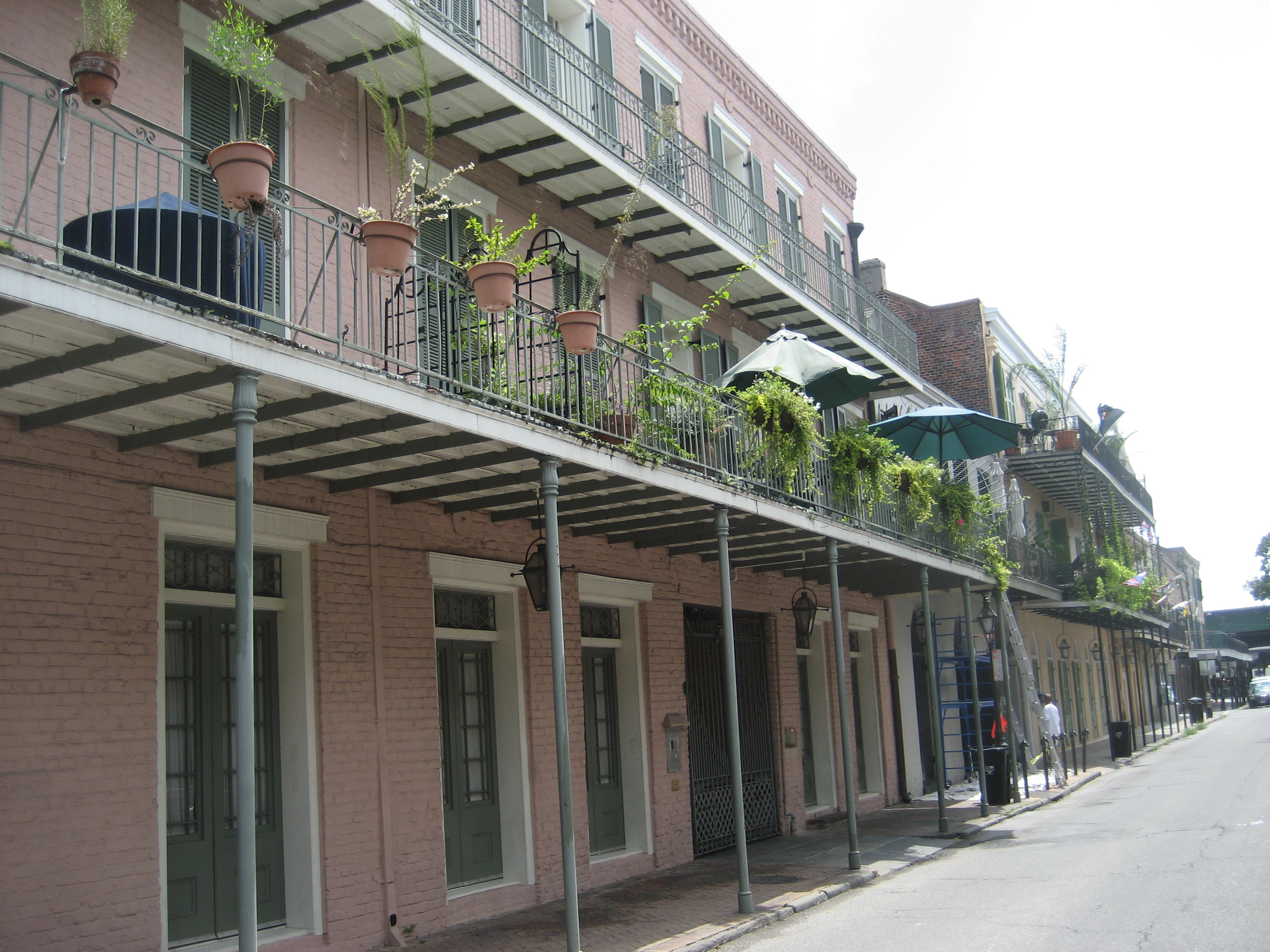
An early gallery design at 529–531 Governor Nicholls Street

Meanwhile, the demand for maximizing living space in an urban setting persisted. Some homeowners extended second-floor balconies to cover the entire sidewalk, still without a roof. Early gallery designs were inspired by wrought-iron balcony railings, featuring patterns like the cathedral arch and scrollwork. Cast iron posts were used to support the extended galleries. A surviving example can still be observed at 529–531 Governor Nicholls Street.

Highly ornate multi-story cast-iron galleries appeared in the 1850s. The first multi-story galleries were constructed for the Pontalba Buildings between 1849 and 1851. These galleries, cast in New York, bear the initials AP of Micaela Almonester, Baroness de Pontalba on them. Another notable set of buildings, the LaBranche Buildings on St. Peter Street between Royal Street and Cabildo Alley, was built in 1840. Beginning in 1850, these eleven buildings saw the addition of cast-iron galleries, each with a distinctive pattern. Between 1852 and 1856, the Touro Buildings were constructed with cast-iron-lace double galleries that encircled the entire city block on Canal Street, between Royal Street and Bourbon Street. Subsequently, in 1858, elaborate galleries were added to enhance the aesthetic appeal of the brick townhouse at 900-902 Royal Street. The property was owned by Miltenberger, an agent of Wood and Perot of Philadelphia, a cast-iron manufacturer. This addition served as a showcase for the company's product.

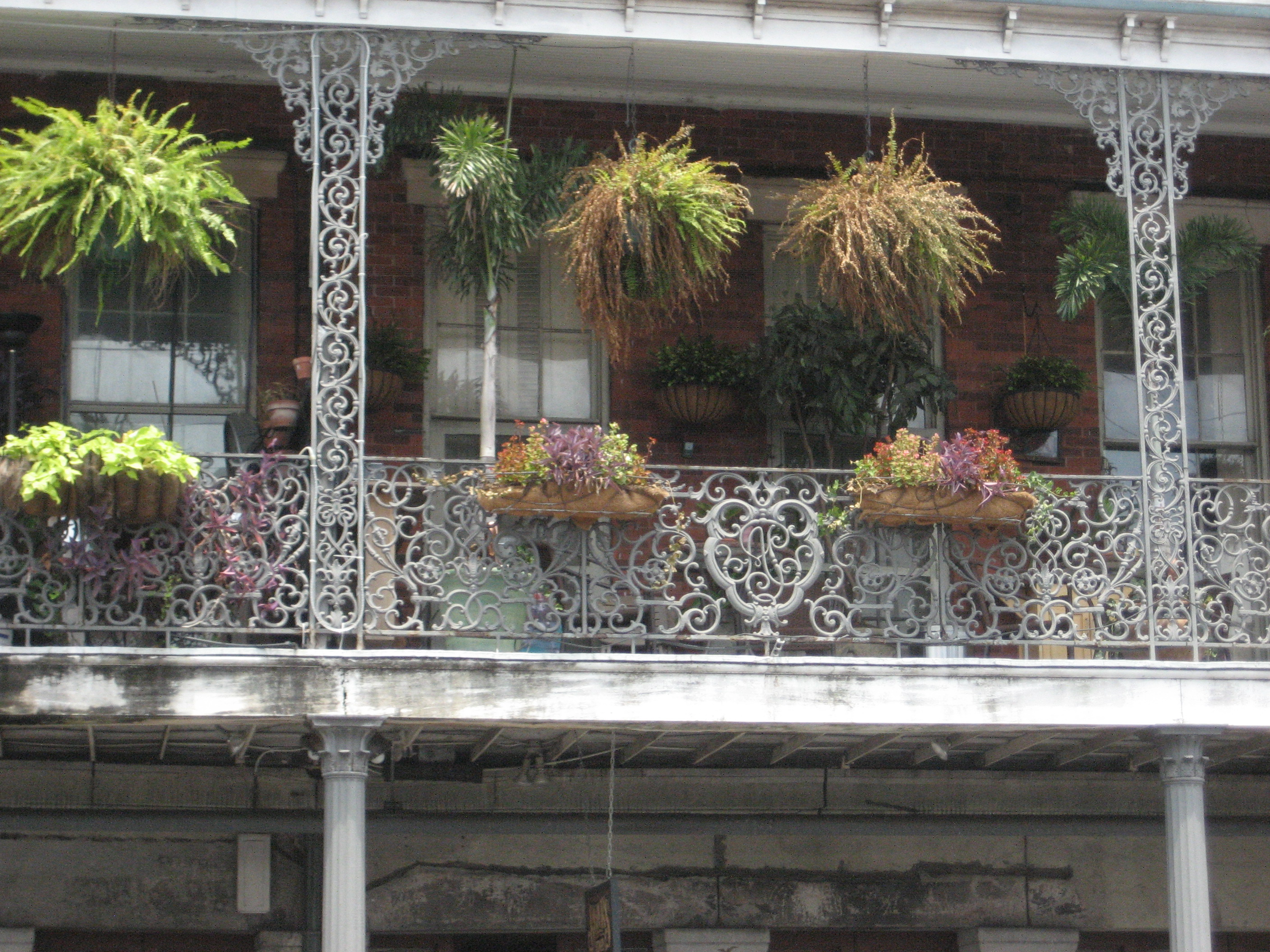
Pontalba's monogram (AP) on ironwork

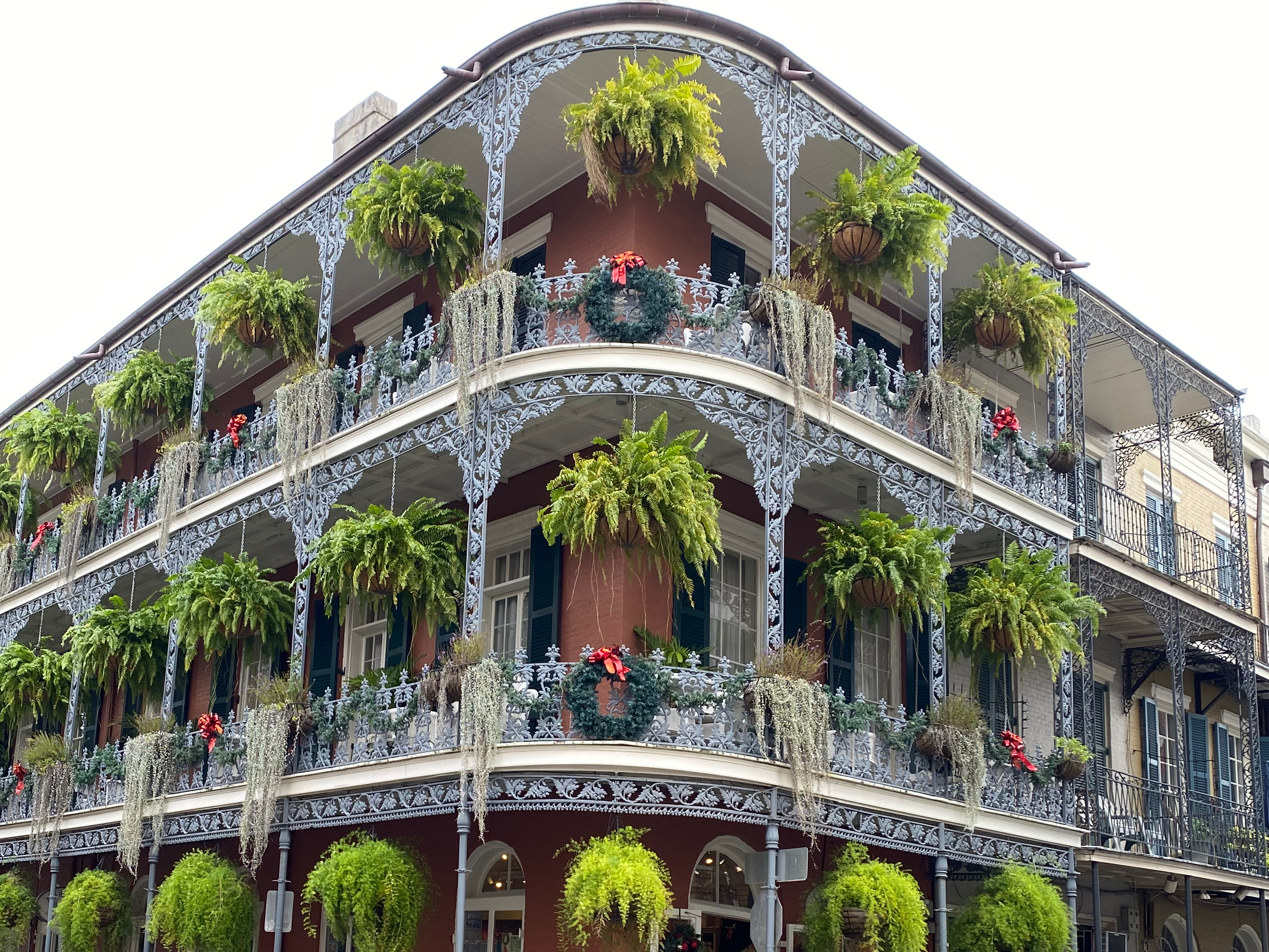
Cast iron galleries of two LaBranche buildings

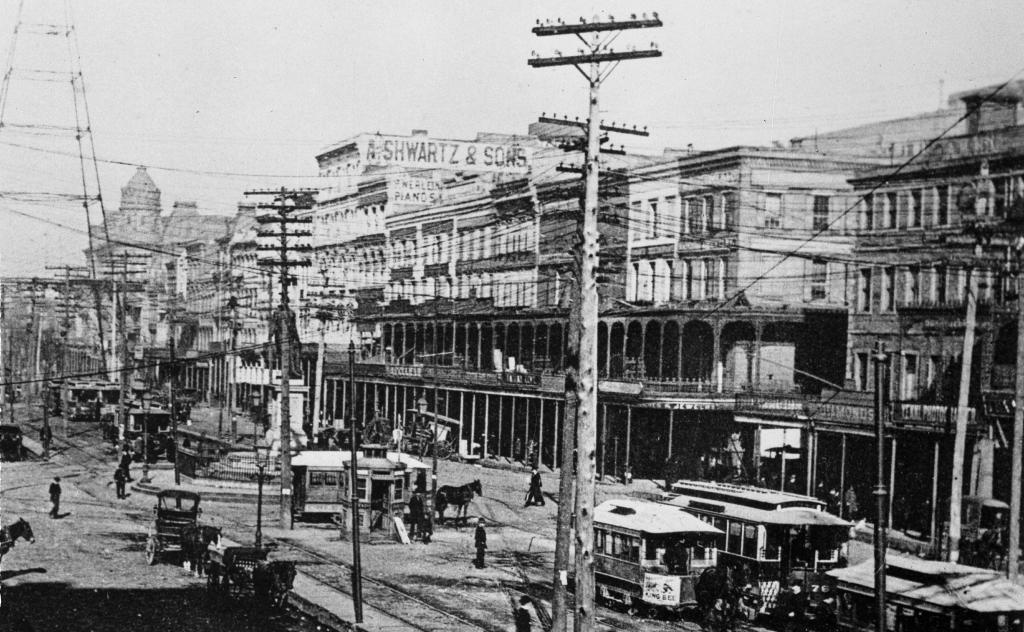
Touro Buildings in 1895

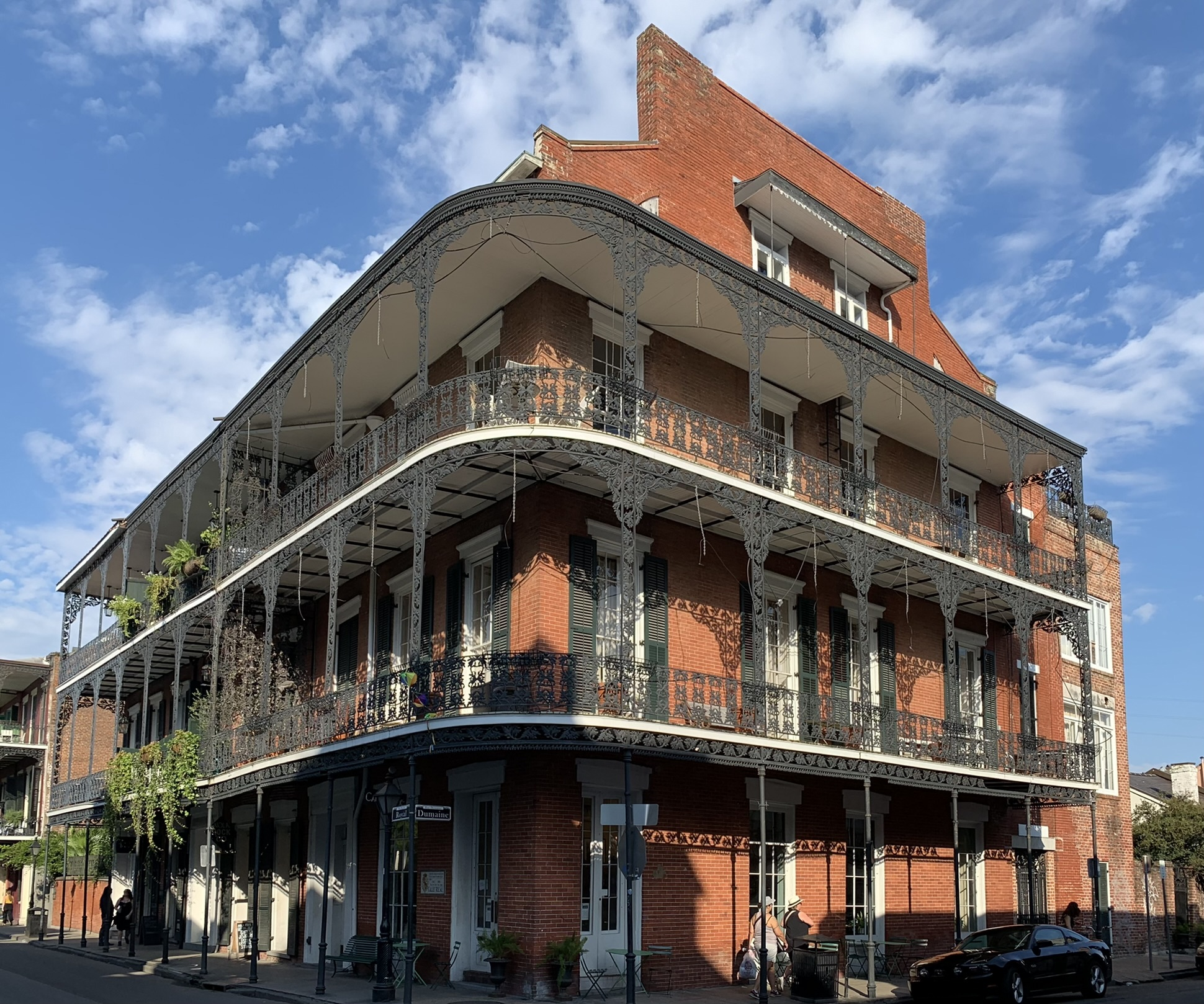
The 1858 galleries of the Miltenberger Houses

The second half of the 19th century witnessed explosive growth in the construction of houses with iron galleries. A researcher conducted an inspection of 2,244 buildings in the French Quarter, revealing that 51 percent of townhouses and 11 percent of commercial buildings had iron-lace galleries. These galleries were built in various styles inspired by the Pontalba and Touro buildings, with an average construction period ranging from 1853 to 1855. Some particularly ornate galleries were incorporated into the initial construction of buildings, such as the second-floor gallery of 817-821 Toulouse Street, which was added during the construction of the two-story Greek Revival building around 1860. Multi-story galleries were also added during building renovation projects; for instance, the third-floor addition in 1870 to 624 Dumaine Street included ornate galleries for the second and third floors. Additionally, some galleries served as replacements for older iron balconies, as seen in the case of 730 Dumaine Street, where iron galleries replaced the original balconies of the 1832 house.

The popularity of cast-iron galleries in New Orleans waned in the 1860s during the American Civil War when Leeds Iron Foundry redirected its iron production to support the Confederacy. By the 1880s, galleries adorned with cast-iron ornaments had lost their uniqueness as the molded patterns became commonplace in many buildings throughout the city's streets, and they were perceived as outdated. In the late 19th century, the conversions of simpler wrought-iron balcony designs to galleries continued. Examples of this can be observed at 400-406 Dauphine Street and 600-616 St. Peter Street. The latter is notable because the wrought-iron railing, originally crafted by master blacksmith Marcellino Hernandes for the narrower balcony of the late 18th-century building, was extended to the full sidewalk width in the 1880s. When the building was reconstructed in 1964, the railing was moved back to serve a narrower balcony, replicating the original building design. In 2013, the balcony was once again extended, becoming a gallery. Despite these reconstructions, the original railing has endured to the present day.

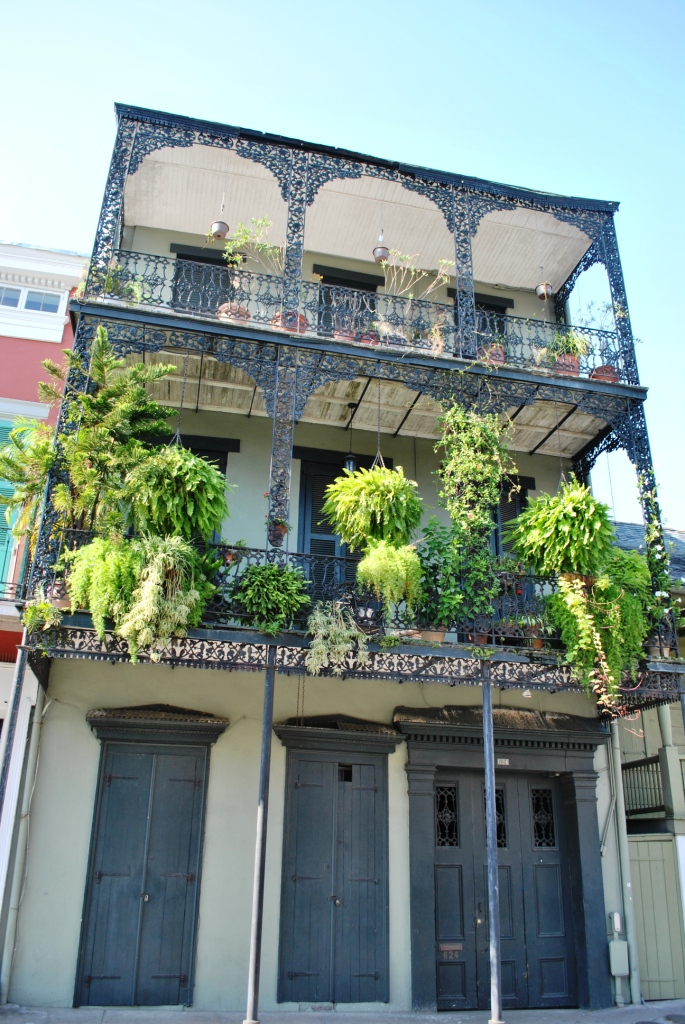
Galleries on upper floors of 624 Dumaine Street

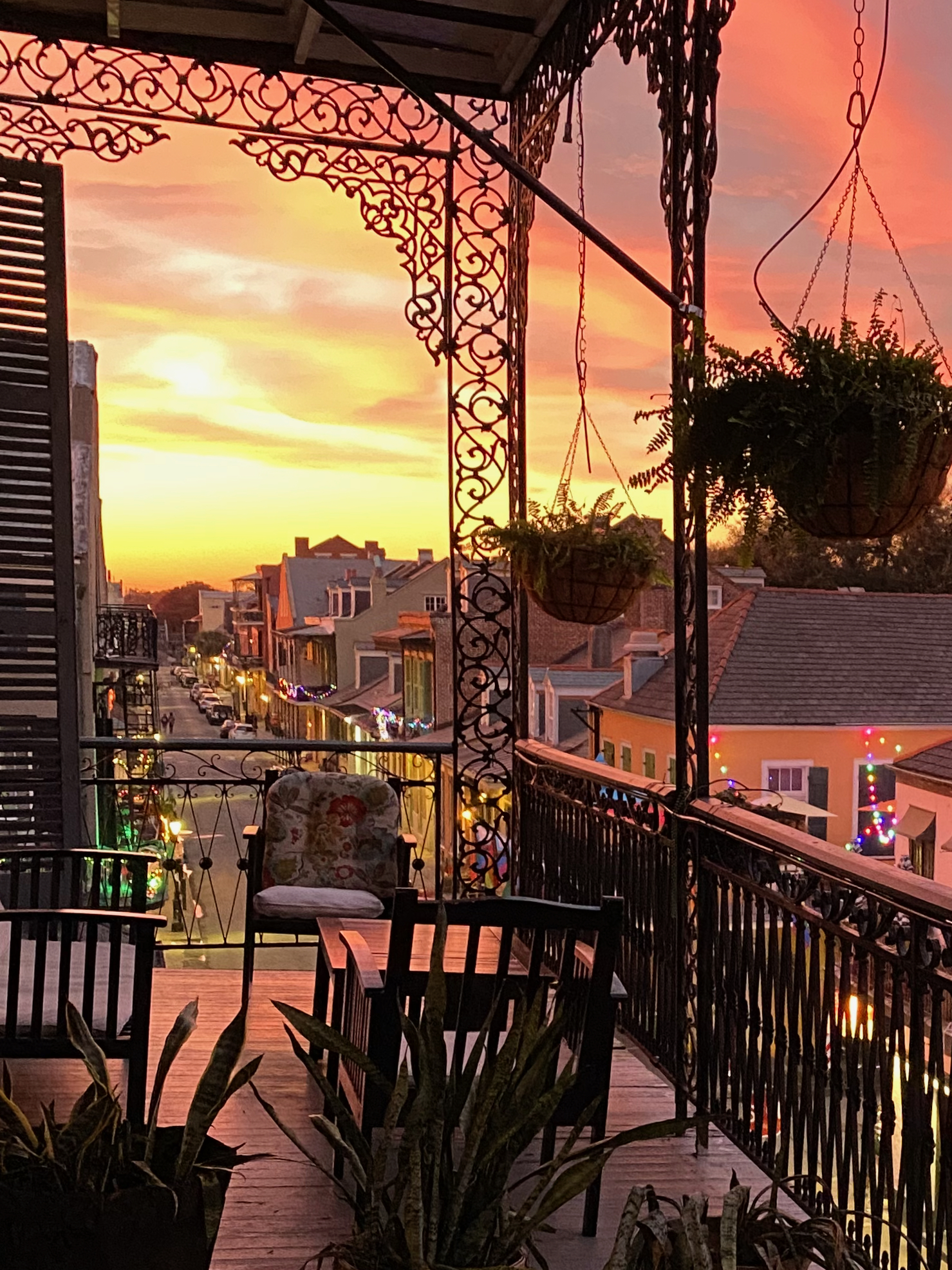
View from 730 Dumaine Street gallery

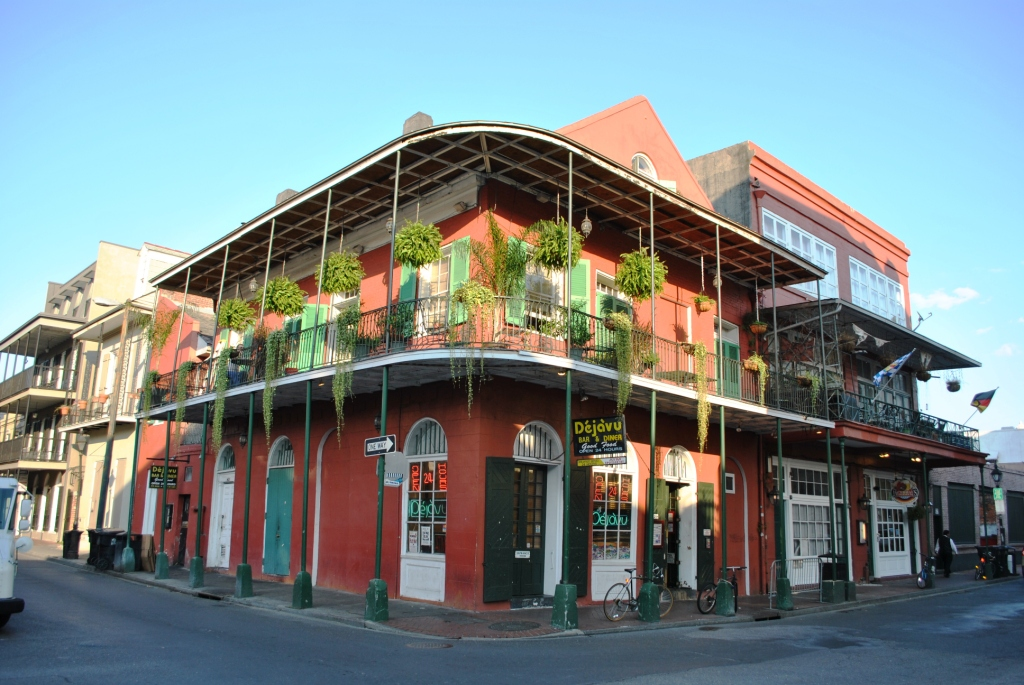
Covered gallery of 400–406 Dauphine Street

By the early 20th century, fashion had changed to align with modern architecture. A large number of cast-iron galleries on Canal Street were removed from the buildings to give a modern look. Gallery removals also occurred in other wealthier districts outside of the French Quarter. During the 20th century, the French Quarter area became crowded and was considered a poorer neighborhood. Property owners had little incentive to invest in upgrading their buildings to modern standards. Most of the buildings retained their 19th-century styles. The construction of new ornate galleries in this period became rare. An exception was the replacement of mid-nineteenth-century cast-iron balconies with ornamental cast-iron galleries at 936-942 Royal Street in the late 1930s. In 1937, the city established the Vieux Carré Commission, initiating a preservation movement to prevent the destruction of architectural heritage in the French Quarter, including the preservation of iron galleries. By the late 20th century, ironwork was carefully incorporated into new building construction. A notable example is the Royal Sonesta hotel built between 1968 and 1969. The buildings occupied the entire block on Bourbon Street between Bienville Street and Conti Street. The exterior was built to follow the style of traditional row houses surrounding an internal courtyard. Multi-story decorative galleries that wrapped around the buildings followed the form of those Miltenberger and LaBranche buildings.

Enduring for nearly two centuries, the iron galleries in the French Quarter have withstood a series of events. The Capture of New Orleans, which occurred quickly during the Civil War without much fighting, left the city unscathed. Neglect from property owners in the early 20th century contributed to the buildings remaining unchanged. Finally, the establishment of the Vieux Carré Commission prevented the ironwork from being repurposed as scrap metal to support World War II. These factors have collectively preserved the unique appearance of the French Quarter that we see today.

== Architectural details ==
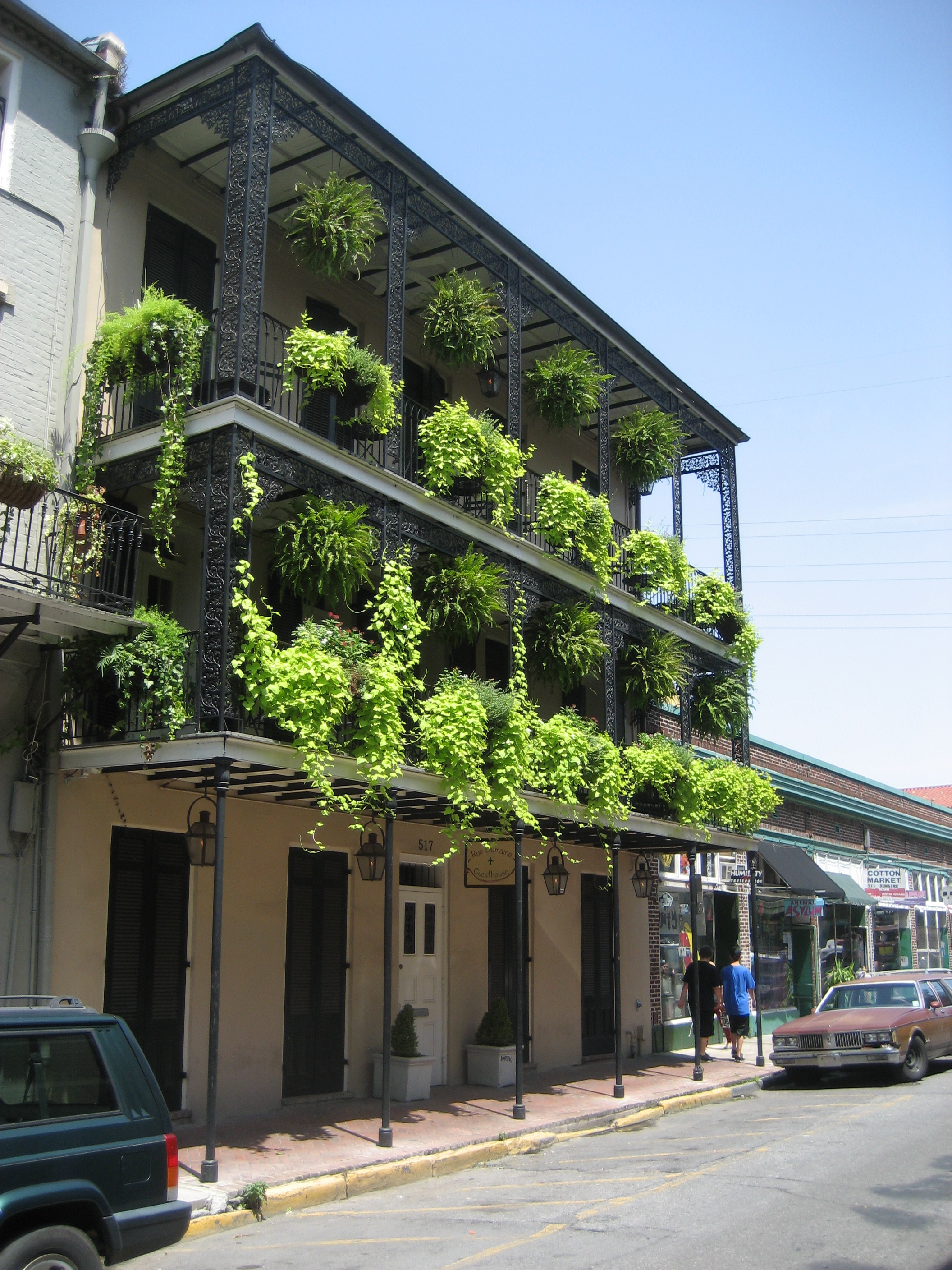
Simple posts on the first floor and more ornate on upper floors

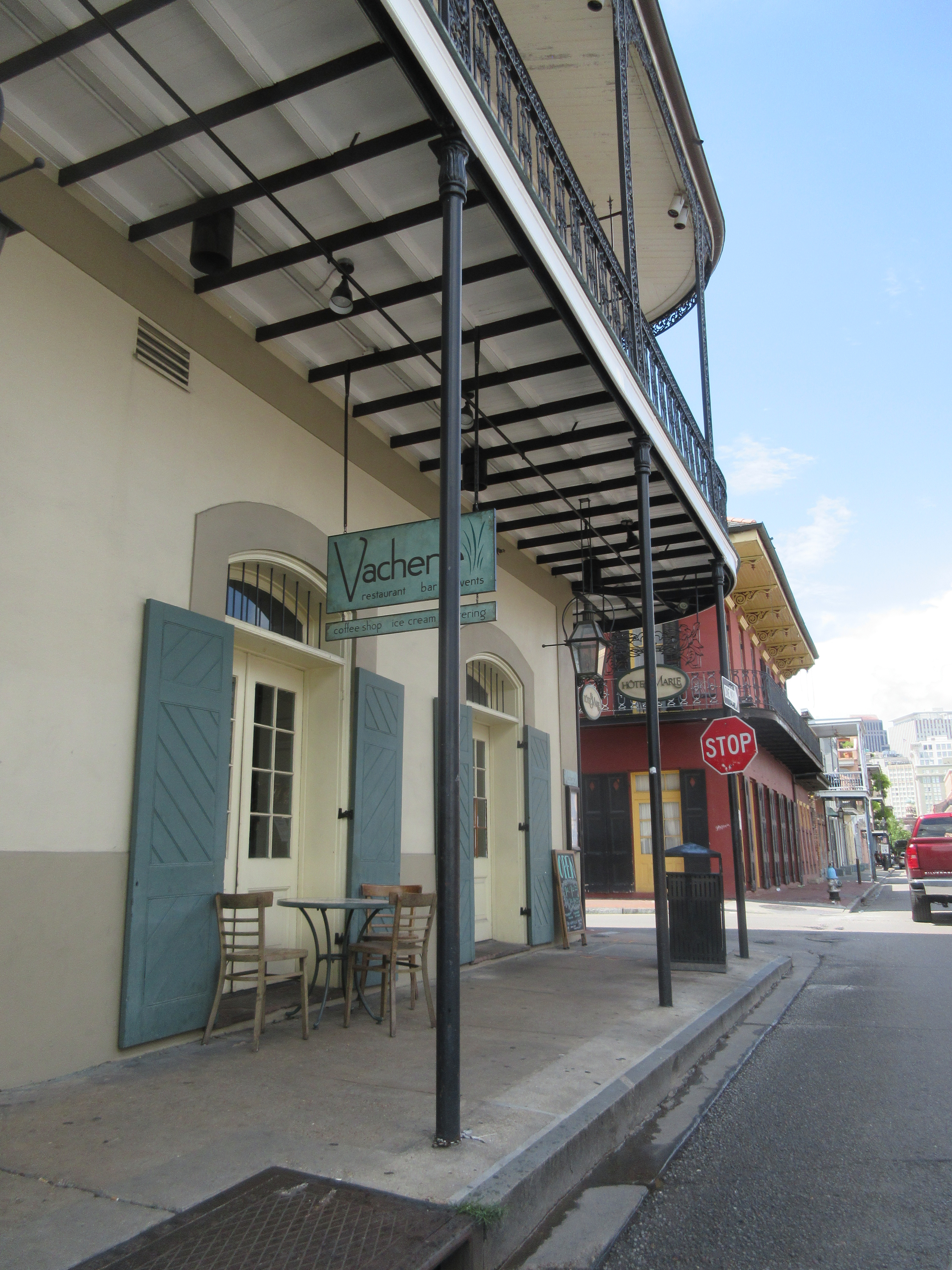
Metal outriggers are used to support galley's deck

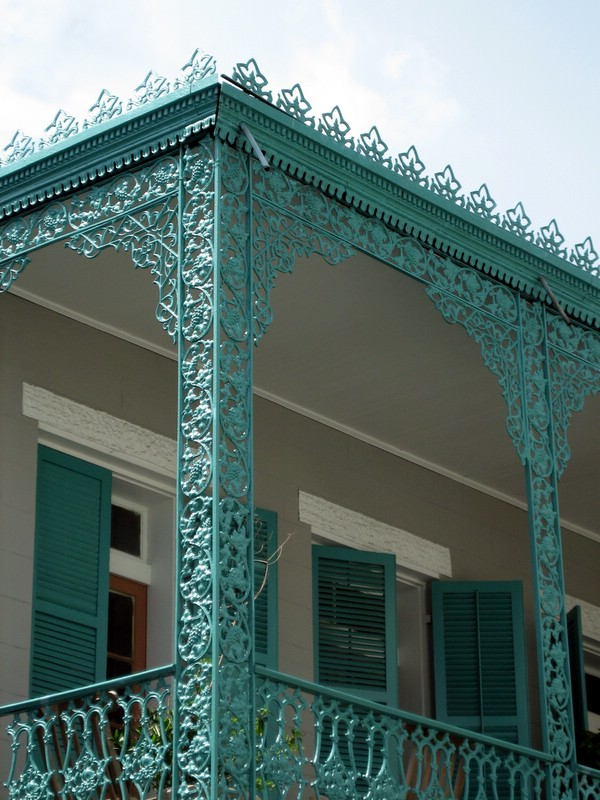
A motif of grapes and vines on the galley of 1127-1129 Chartres Street

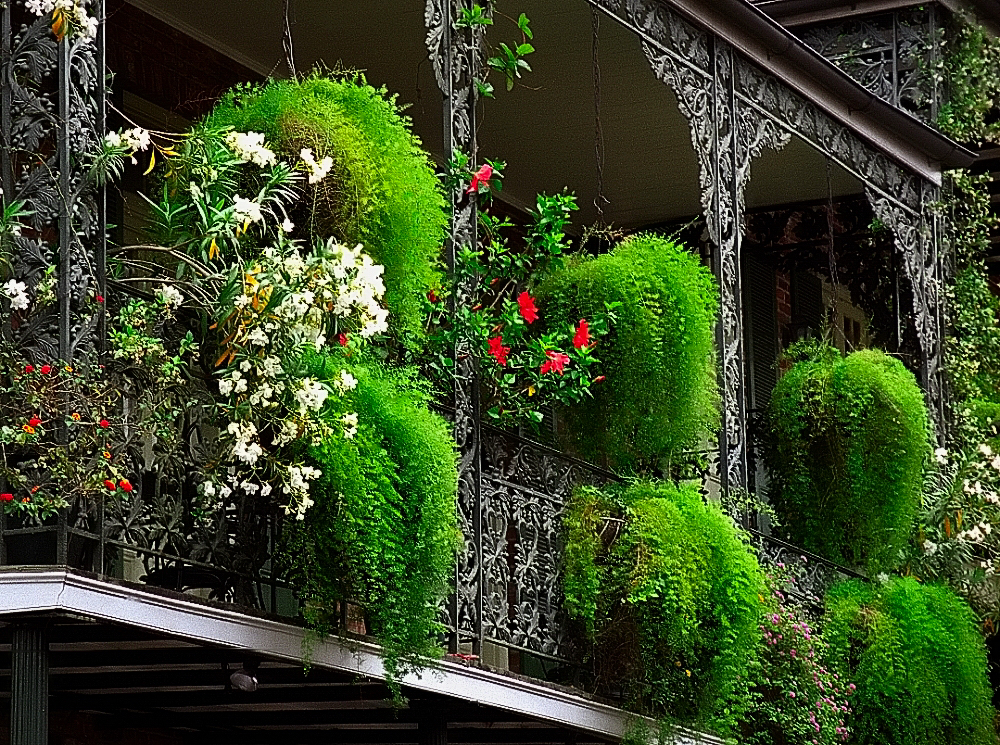
A gallery with patterns of oak leaves and acorns

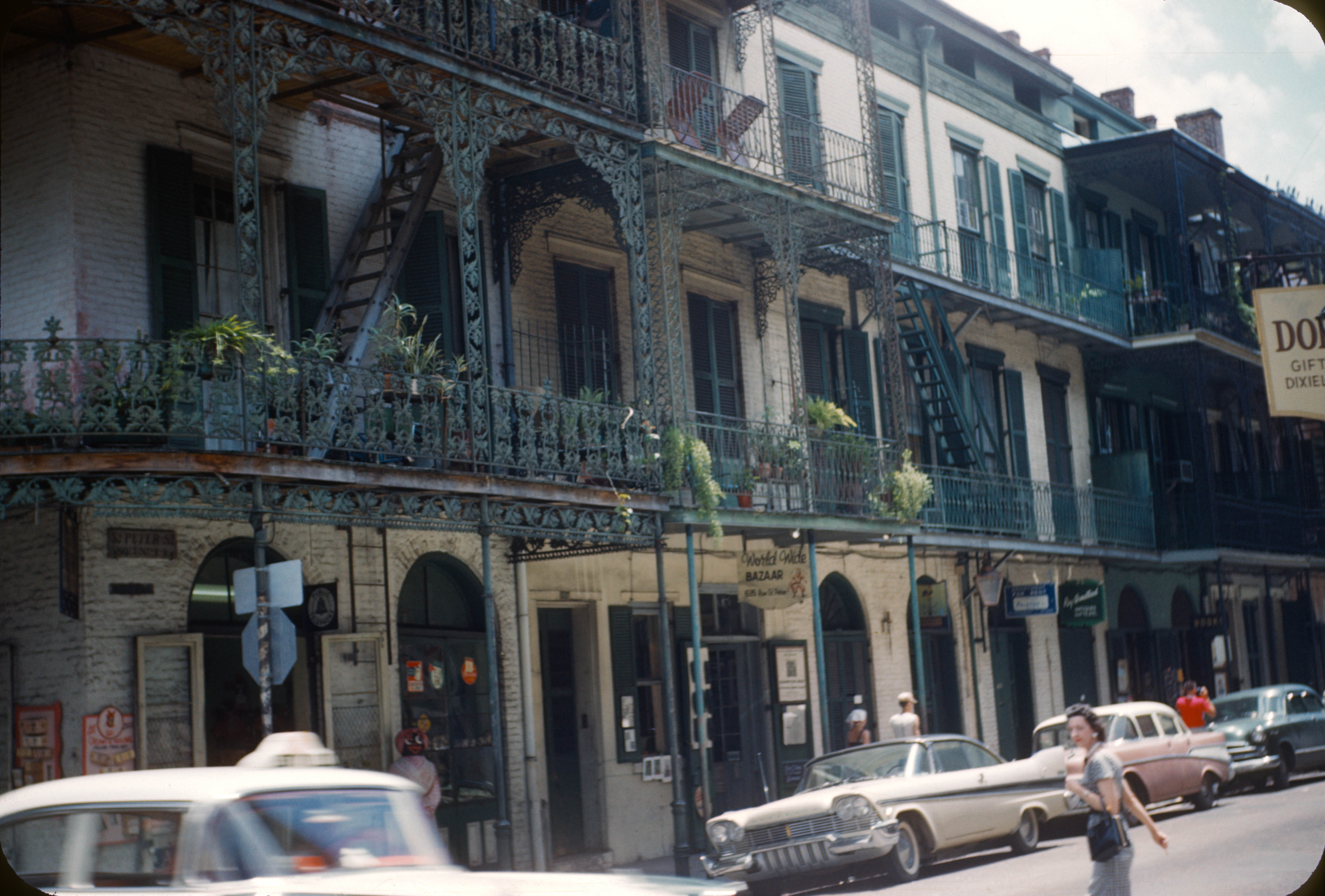
Fire escapes at 700-708 Royal Street used to be part of the galleries but they no longer meet the building code.

== See also ==
- Balcony
