= Immaculate Conception Church (New Orleans) =

Jesuit Catholic church in United States

Coordinates: 29.9535°N 90.0715°W

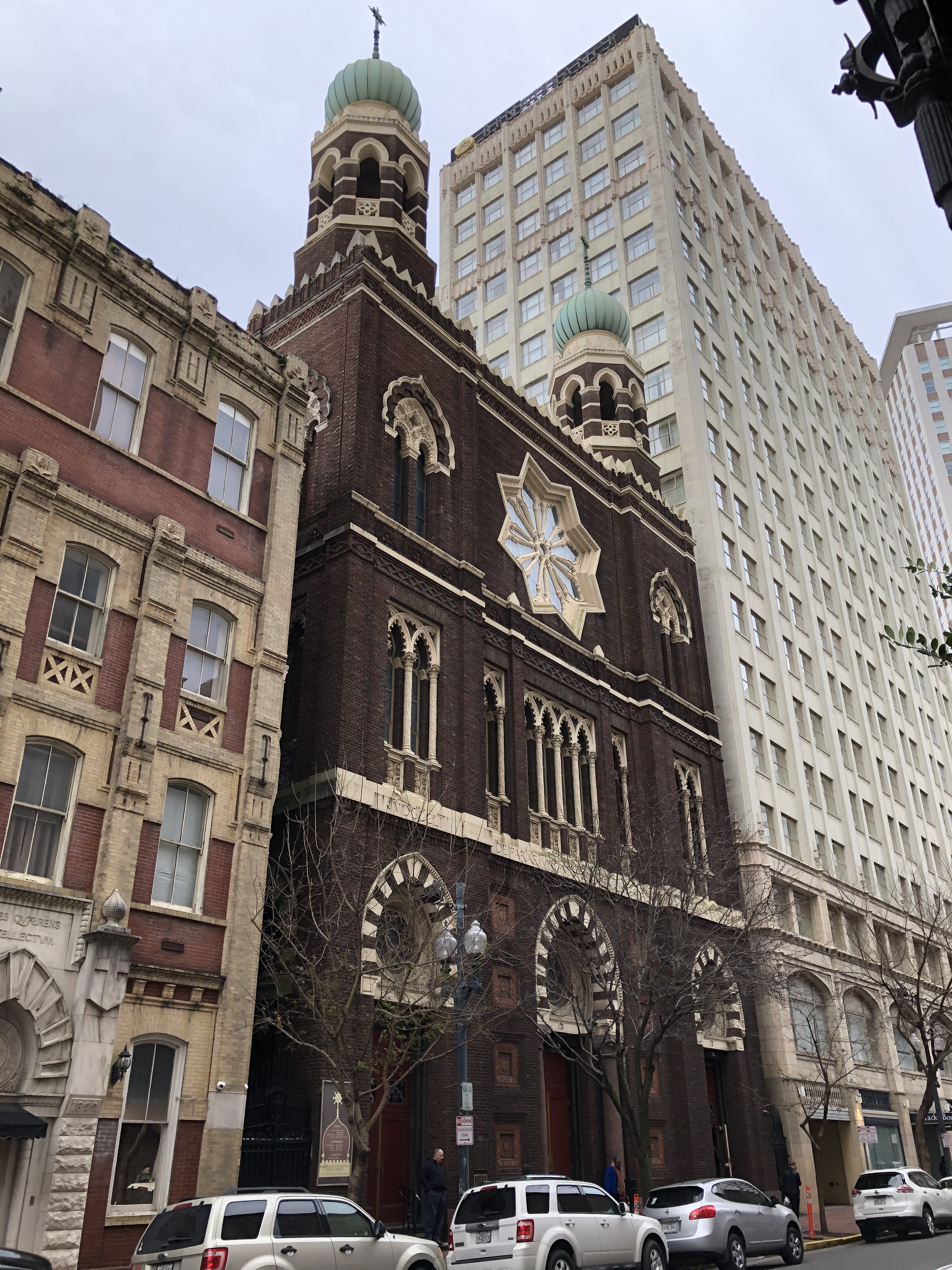
Façade in Venetian Gothic Revival and Moorish Revival styles

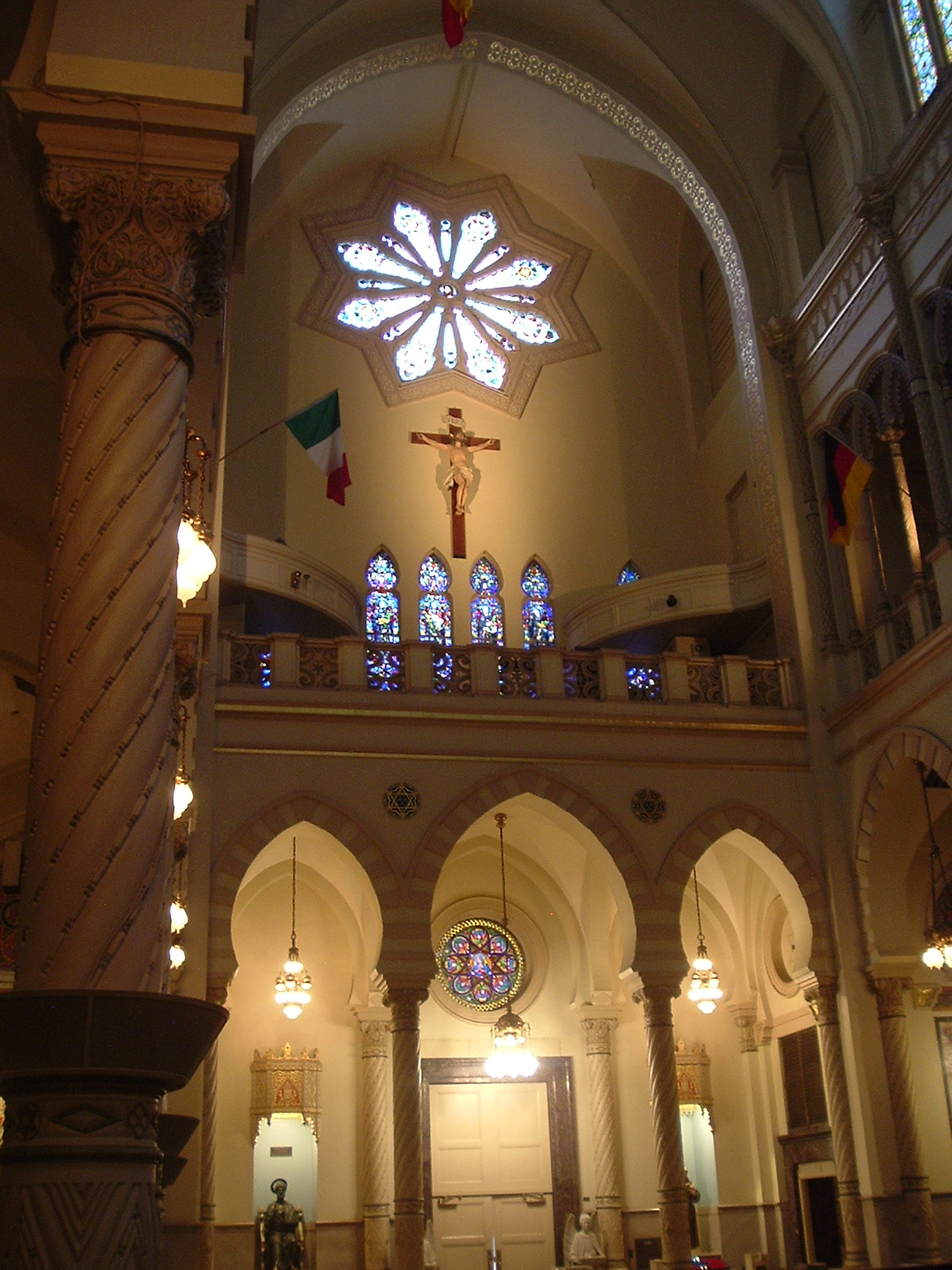
Interior, with stained glass windows

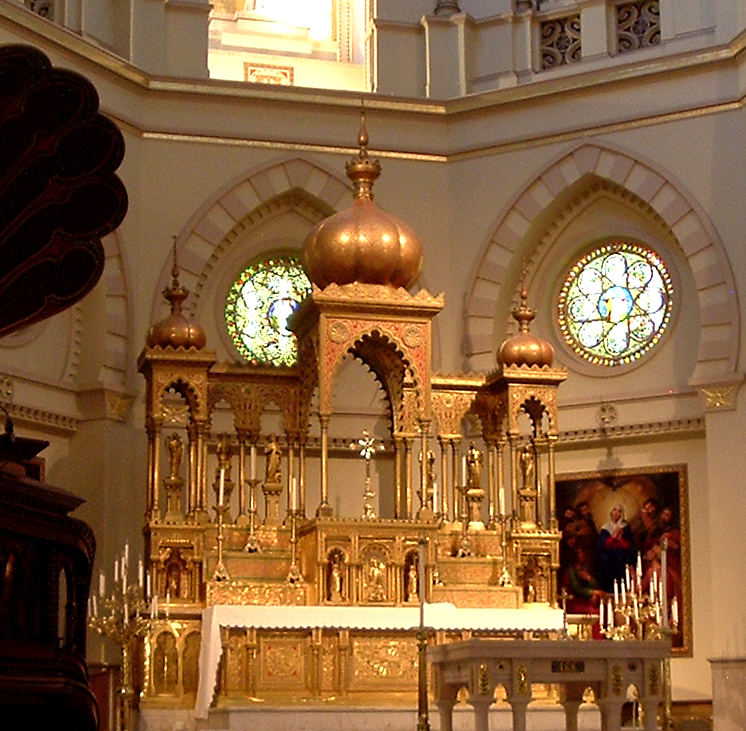
Altar, handmade in Lyon, France

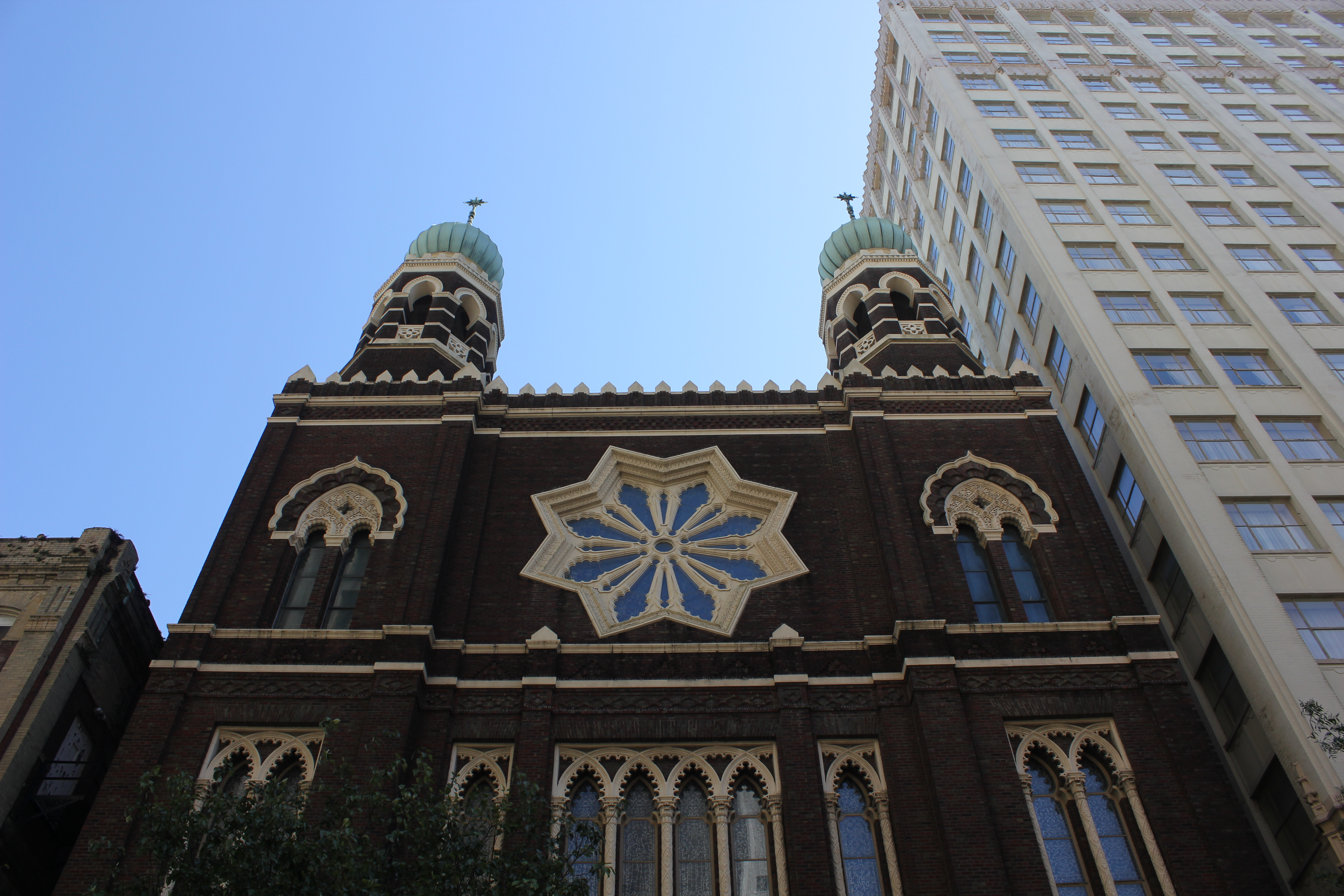
Façade in Venetian Gothic Revival and Moorish Revival styles

Immaculate Conception church, locally known as Jesuit church, is a Roman Catholic church in the Central Business District of New Orleans, Louisiana. The church is located at 130 Baronne Street, and is part of the local Jesuit community. The present church, completed in 1930, is a near duplicate of an earlier 1850s church on the same site.

== History ==
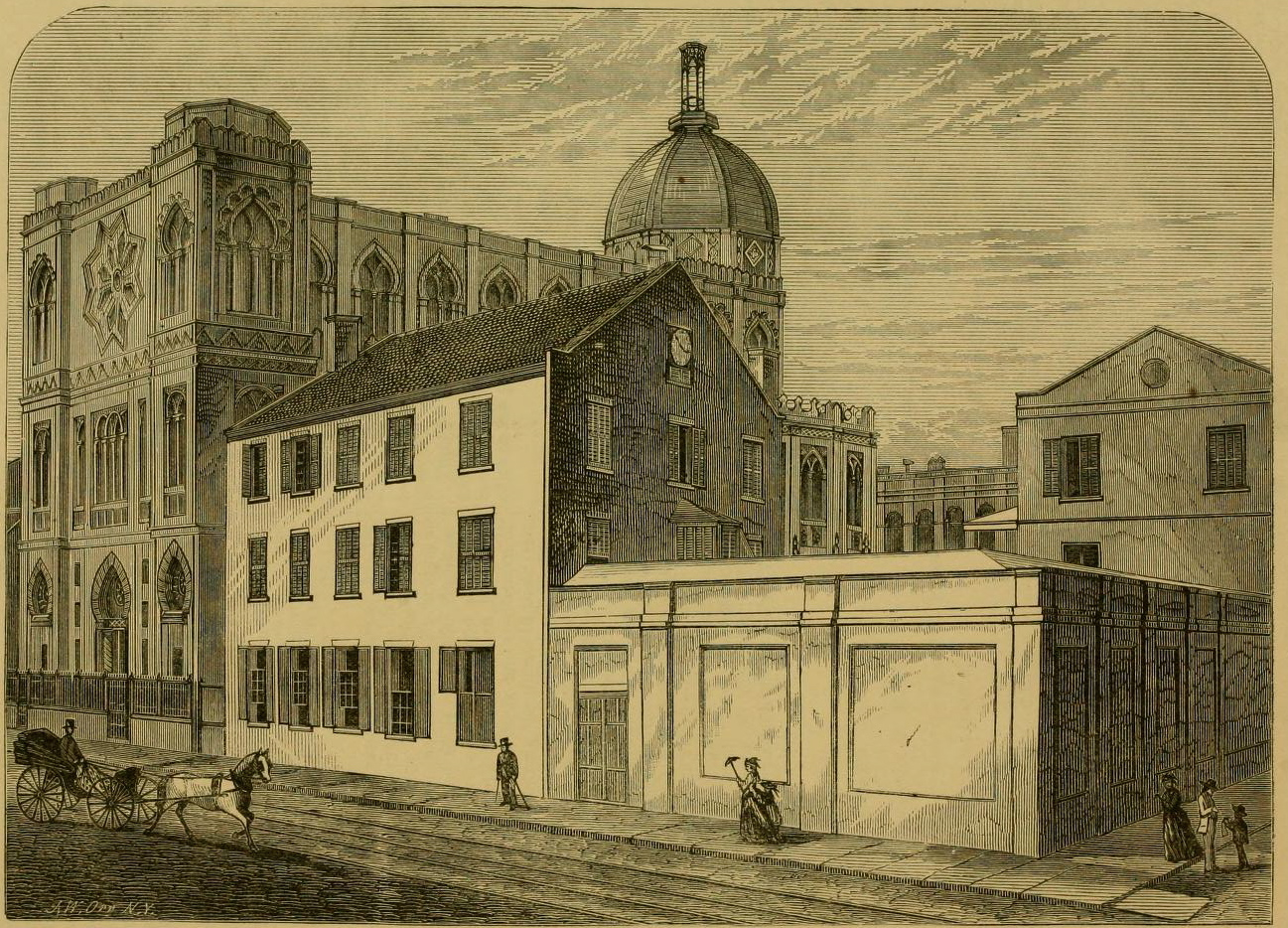
First building of the Church of the Immaculate Conception in 1873

Two Immaculate Conception churches, nearly identical to each other, were built on the same site over time. The first church was designed by Fr. John Cambiaso, S.J., and completed in 1857. In the late 1920s, it suffered foundation damage due to the construction of the Pere Marquette building. The church's floor split in half. The building was disassembled in 1928. New footings at the same site were laid in 1929 with the cornerstone laid on 16 May 1929. The new church building, incorporating many fixtures from the older church, was dedicated on 2 March 1930.

In November 2025, the Archdiocese of New Orleans placed over 150 parishes and charities in Chapter 11 bankruptcy protection as part of a settlement plan to resolve hundreds of sex abuse lawsuits. This wave of bankruptcies included this church.

== Architecture ==
Immaculate Conception church was built and designed in the Neo-Venetian Gothic style of Gothic Revival architecture, with Moorish Revival and Byzantine Revival elements.

=== Interior ===
When one enters the church, one is met with the enormous height of the nave, compared to other churches in New Orleans. The columns begin with niches in which small statues of archangels stand, and then what is reminiscent of a Solomonic column.

The many stained glass windows of the church, depicting Jesuit saints, are among the finer in America. They are seen when facing back towards the entrance. The interior also is furnished with religious paintings and murals.

The pews are made of cast iron, with Moorish tracery, rosettes, and designs particularly symbolic of scriptural references. The chandeliers of fine bronze are of both Moorish and Byzantine styles.

The brilliant altar was handmade in Lyon, France, and is 24 karat gold-plated. The central focal point of the church is "Mary's Niche", a solid-marble statue of the Blessed Virgin standing in front of a gilded, lit background. At the same level are found four other statues of saints.

=== College chapel ===
As the Jesuit province in New Orleans grew, the Jesuits purchased the plot of land which is now Jesuit High School. Beforehand the school, called Immaculate Conception College, was adjacent to the church. The Jesuit priests lived inside an area of Jesuit High School which contains a chapel (Thomas Semmes Memorial Chapel) of the same architectural design as the church (the chapel was disassembled then moved to Jesuit's present location). This chapel is not to be confused with the Chapel of the North American Martyrs at Jesuit High School, which was completed in 1953 in a Neoclassical style and is much larger.

=== Louisiana Cotton Exposition Organ ===
The remnants of the 1884 World Cotton Centennial or Louisiana Cotton Exposition Organ are housed within the church. The pipe organ was originally built by Pilcher, and was the biggest pipe organ manufactured by the company. When it was being played inside the fair building, it caused the collapse of the main tent.

The organ had major renovations and additions by M.P. Moller before it was given to the Jesuit Fathers. It operated in the original church and was moved to the Fairmont Hotel, across the street, while the church was being reconstructed. Then the organ was installed in the 'new' 1929 church, with modifications by M.P. Moller. The organ's façade contained 32 feet (9.8 m) tall Open Diapason pipes, with Moorish Revival style stenciling on them.

The organ was later abandoned, but left intact inside the structure. There are large swell shades in the walls at the back of the church. It was replaced by a much smaller organ by Pilcher.

After several years of using the second smaller organ, the church replaced it with a digital organ by Phoenix.

== See also ==
- List of Jesuit sites
