= Townhouse =

Individual urban house in a terrace or row

A townhouse, townhome, town house, or town home is a type of terraced housing or close-set single family homes of several stories. A modern townhouse is often one with multiple floors on a small footprint. In older British usage, the term originally referred to any type of city residence (normally in London) of someone whose main or largest residence was a country house.

== History ==
Historically, a townhouse was the city residence of a noble or wealthy family, who would own one or more country houses in which they lived for much of the year. From the 18th century, landowners and their servants would move to a townhouse during the social season (when major balls took place).

== United States and Canada ==
In the United States and Canada, a townhouse has two connotations. The older predates the automobile and denotes a house on a small footprint in a city, which because of its multiple floors (sometimes six or more) has a large living space, often with servants' quarters. The small footprint of the townhouse allows it to be within walking or mass-transit distance of business and industrial areas of the city, yet luxurious enough for wealthy residents of the city.

Townhouses are expensive where detached single-family houses are uncommon, such as in New York City, Philadelphia, Montreal, and San Francisco. A brownstone townhouse is a particular variety found in New York and to some extent in Philadelphia and Boston.

== See also ==
- Creole townhouse
- Duplex
- List of house types
- Multi-family residential
- Pied-à-terre
- Shophouse
- Sobrado (Portugal and Brazil)
- Streetcar suburb
- Tenement
- Terraced house
- Townhouse (Great Britain)
