= James Gallier =

Irish-American architect (1798–1866)

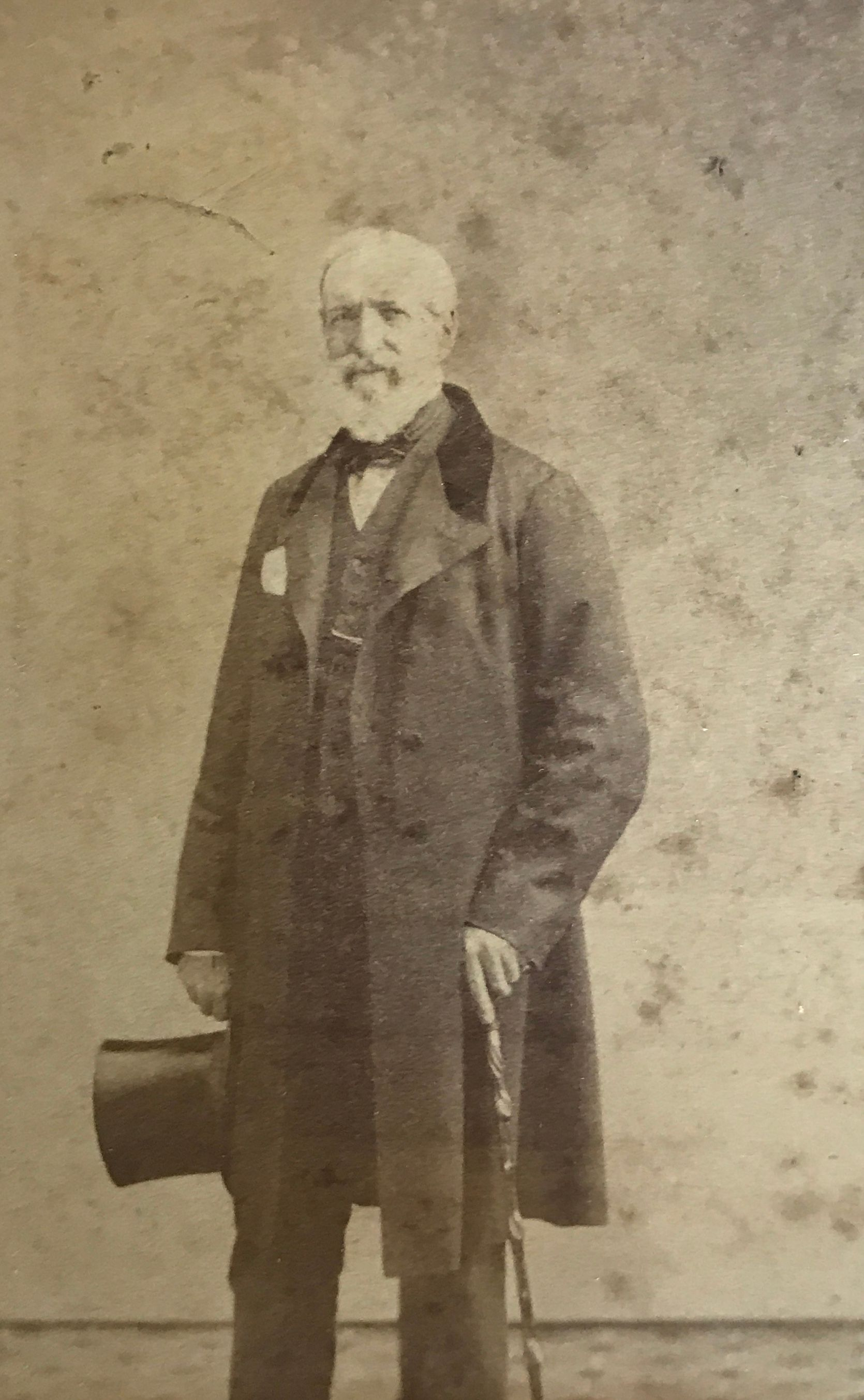
- Portrait photograph of American architect James Gallier, Sr., ca. 1860.
- Born: James Gallagher; 24 July 1798; Ravensdale, Ireland
- Died: 3 October 1866 (aged 68); At sea, east of Tybee Island, Georgia
- Occupation: Architect
- Buildings: Gallier Hall, the Leeds-Davis Building, the Second Christ Church Cathedral

James Gallier (24 July 1798– 3 October 1866) was a prominent nineteenth-century Irish-born American architect, most famed for his buildings in New Orleans. Gallier Hall, which he designed and once served as New Orleans City Hall, is named after him.

== Early life ==
Barton Academy in Mobile, Alabama, designed by James and Charles Dakin and James Gallier in 1836.

He was born in Ravensdale, County Louth, Ireland in 1798 as James Gallagher, the son of Thaddeus Gallagher, a builder who also trained James in the profession.

Gallier was admitted to the "School of Fine Arts" in Dublin according to Supplement 1 of the Dictionary of American Biography, but if this refers to the Royal Dublin Society's School of Architectural Drawing, there is no record of a James Gallagher or James Gallier having been admitted at any other time. He worked in Manchester during 1816 before returning home to Ireland, where he attended Samuel Nielson's school in Dundalk, and with his younger brother John (b. 1800) engaged in building work at Mourne Park in 1818 and in Dundalk in 1821–22.

== Early career in Ireland, England, and New York ==
Gallier (then still known as Gallagher), returned to England in 1822 with his brother and worked for the next ten years in Huntingdon and London. In 1827, he designed the Godmanchester Chinese Bridge which crosses a mill stream of the River Great Ouse in 1827, and then worked on the redevelopment of the Grosvenor Estate in Mayfair, along with commissions for college buildings, prisons, and factories. During two of these years he apparently worked for famed Greek Revival architect William Wilkins (1778–1839). He went bankrupt, however, and decided to immigrate to the US in 1832.

Arriving in the US in New York, Gallier formed a brief partnership with his exact contemporary Minard Lafever (1798–1854), and published The American Builder's General Price Book and Estimator (1833). From Lafever undoubtedly Gallier met the brothers Charles (1811–1839) and James Dakin (1806–1852), who were then working for the prominent New York architects Ithiel Town and Alexander Jackson Davis. Town & Davis employed Gallier (then still called Gallagher) for four months in 1834 for the wage of $2.00 a day. Town and Davis, and James Dakin on his own in 1834, were in the midst of designing some of the most distinguished Greek Revival buildings in the United States at the time, including the Bank of Louisville in Kentucky (1834), as well as the First Presbyterian Church in Troy, New York (1835).

The American cities of the North were growing too crowded for many in the architectural profession, and in the 1810s, '20, and '30s many, including Benjamin Latrobe (1764–1820) and William Strickland (1788–1854), left Washington and Philadelphia, respectively, for southern destinations like Nashville and New Orleans, and Gallier and Charles Dakin followed suit in 1834, departing New York for New Orleans. According to one source, Gallier changed his last name at this time, probably to fit in better with the Francophone community there, which was still quite large and powerful; but according to Gallier's own autobiography, the name Gallier had been in the family since at least the seventeenth century. Despite jettisoning that particular piece of Irish heritage, Gallier still sought out his ethnic brethren as clients in the Irish community of Faubourg St. Mary, now known as the Central Business District.

== Move to New Orleans ==
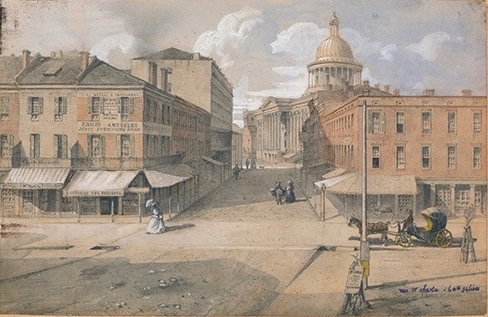
The St. Charles Hotel as it looked from Canal Street, 1847.

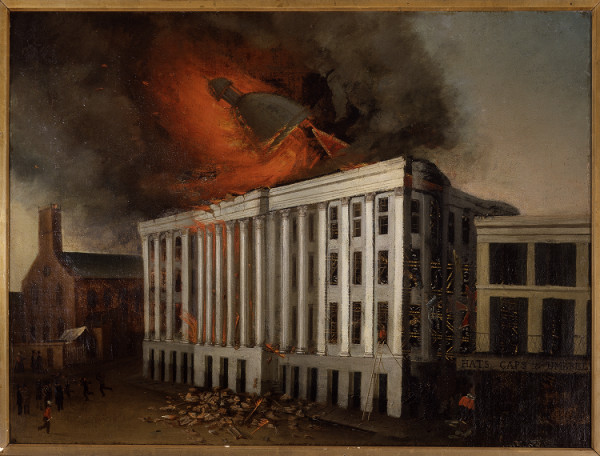
The St. Charles Hotel burning, January 1851.

In 1835 James Dakin soon joined his brother and Gallier in New Orleans and the three of them founded an architecture firm. Their firm quickly became one of the most important in the city and the Gulf region, even though much of their early work from the 1830s no longer survives. Amongst the earliest and most significant was the St. Charles Hotel (1835–37), which was one of the first large buildings constructed on Canal Street, which would develop into the city's main commercial artery. This impressive Greek Revival structure had a 6-column projecting Corinthian portico, marble front steps, and huge dome, second only in size in the US to the cupola of the United States Capitol in Washington, D.C. The ballroom in the basement was octagonal in plan, 70 feet (21 m) in diameter and 20 feet (6.1 m) high, encircled by Ionic columns; above this sat the lower saloon with a height of 18 feet (5.5 m), into which the marble staircase led. The saloon contained a marble statue of George Washington. From there, a grand spiral staircase continued up to the dome, with a gallery level stretching around it on each of the upper stories. The cupola itself was 46 feet (14 m) in diameter and sat on an octagonal drum; it was capped by a light well of Corinthian columns. At the top of the spiral stairs at the base of the dome was a large 11-foot (3.4 m) wide gallery, which afforded views of the entire city at a height of 185 ft (56 m). The hotel cost an enormous sum of $600,000 to build ($19.9 million in 2021), plus $100,000 for the land. It remained quite possibly the city's most prominent building and rivaled all others in the US until it burned on 18 January 1851; it was rebuilt in modified form by Thomas Sully.

During this period Gallier and the Dakins also designed The Second Christ Church Cathedral on St. Charles Avenue (1837), an Episcopalian Church and later a synagogue, but since demolished; Union Terrace" (1836–37) on Canal Street, of the State Arsenal (1839), and of the gracious row of thirteen houses on Julia Street known as the "Thirteen Buildings" or the Julia Street Row, where famed American architect Henry Hobson Richardson (1838–1886) would grow up. They also completed the Verandah Hotel (1837–38), and the Merchants' Exchange (1835–36) on Royal Street. In 1838 Dakin designed St. Patrick's Church, an ambitious effort in a rich Gothic style, supposedly modeled on York Minster. When difficulties occurred in its construction, Gallier was called in to revise the foundations and Dakin lost the contract in 1839. Ever afterward Gallier erroneously claimed it as one of his buildings. Charles also established a branch of the firm in Mobile, Alabama, and there the Dakins and Gallier completed Barton Academy in 1836 and Government Street Presbyterian Church (1836), now a National Historic Landmark. A large fire in Mobile in 1839 destroyed much of the firm's unfinished work there; that same year Charles apparently became depressed after the collapse of a row of warehouses he designed and left for Texas to start over, but died later in 1839 in St. Gabriel, Louisiana.

== Mature career ==
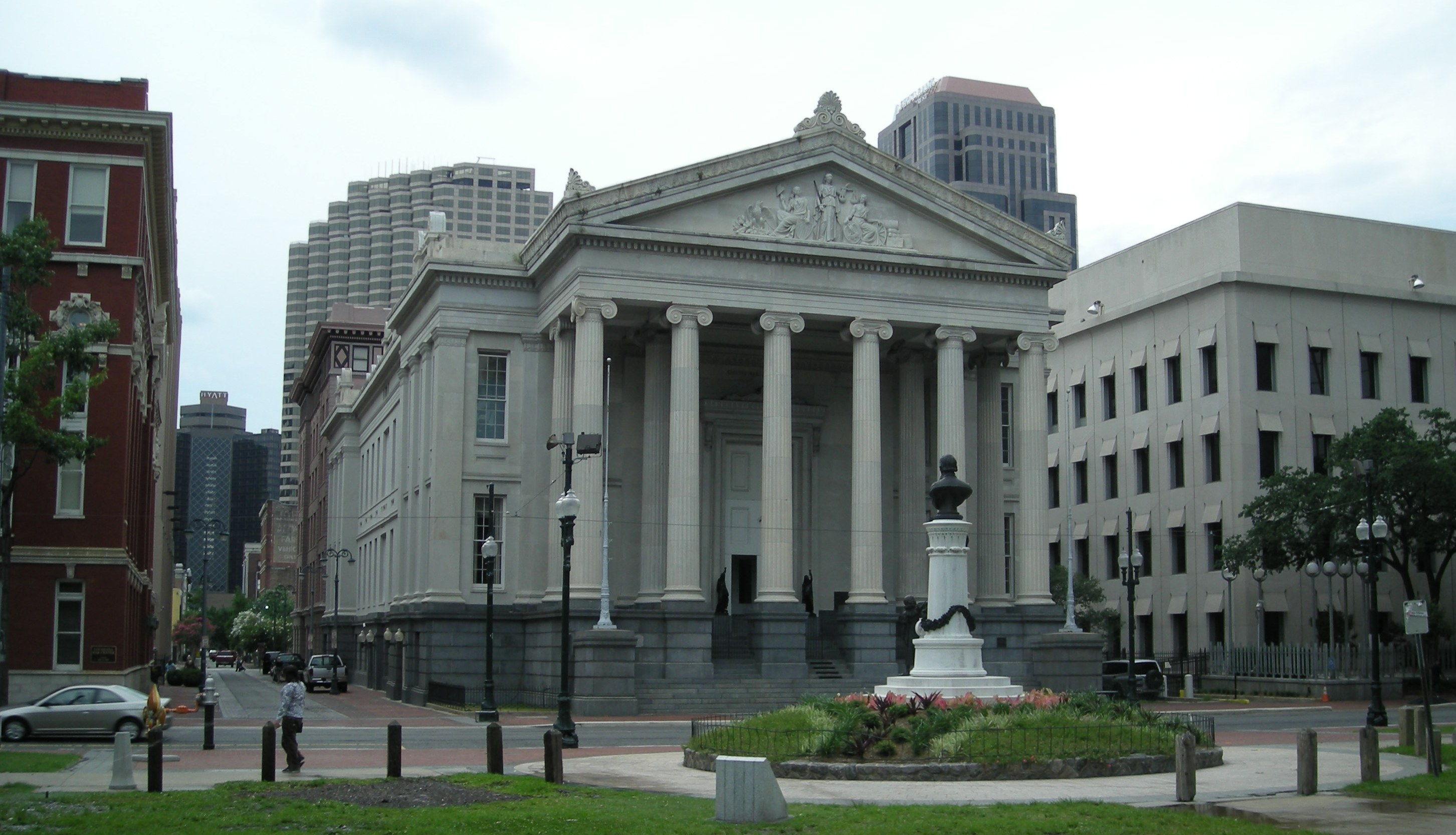
Gallier Hall on Lafayette Square (1853).

After leaving the Dakins, Gallier found his services were in high demand, as the city's population had expanded between 1830 and 1840 from 46,082 to 102,193. Areas upriver from Canal Street were being developed as the home for English speaking Americans and Irish immigrants. In this now-central part of New Orleans, which stretches from Canal Street to the Garden District, Gallier was commissioned to build a new structure housing many municipal services for this district, one of three "municipalities" that the city had been effectively divided into in an effort to reduce tensions between the different ethnic groups of Creoles, Anglophones, French, Spanish, and Free People of Color, an arrangement that soon proved unworkable. Nonetheless, when the various districts were abolished and city government reunited, Gallier's new building, a large porticoed Greek-Revival structure located on Lafayette Square and completed in 1853, became the new City Hall. Later named after him as Gallier Hall, it served in the same capacity for more than a century, before relinquishing these duties to the present New Orleans City Hall in 1957. The building is mostly constructed of brick, scored to look like stone, with only the façade made of marble and granite; even so, the building costs totalled $342,000 ($12.9 million in 2021). The Ionic order, especially the column capitals of the portico, were modelled on the Erechtheion on the Athens Acropolis.

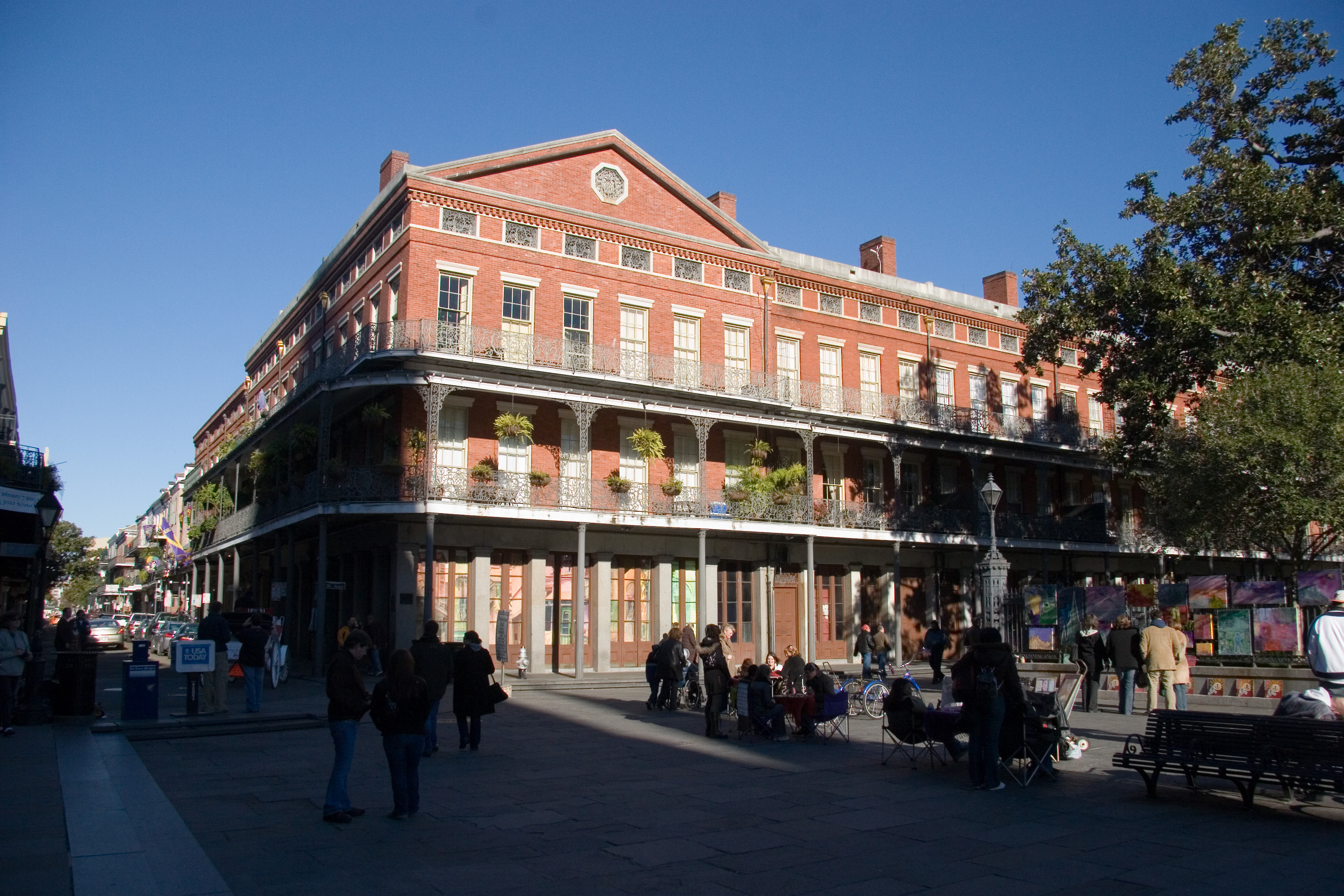
The Pontalba Buildings.

Gallier also became known for a number of private residences, including 824 (then 148) Canal Street, the home of the surgeon Dr. William Newton Mercer, who was also a plantation owner from Mississippi, which since 1844 has been home to The Boston Club. Often Gallier is credited with designing Belle Grove Plantation in White Castle, Louisiana (1857), one of the largest antebellum mansions built in Louisiana and abandoned since 1920, but since it was constructed well after Gallier retired, his son James Gallier, Jr., is suspected to have carried out the design work.

Another complex surely seen by nearly every visitor to New Orleans are the group of two nearly identical sets of townhouses (now apartments and commercial ground-level shops) flanking the north and south sides of Jackson Square in the French Quarter or Vieux Carré, built in 1849–51 and known as the Pontalba Buildings. These red-brick structures frame the park as well as the trio of government and religious structures of the Cabildo, Presbytère, and St. Louis Cathedral. Commissioned by the Baroness Micaela Almonester Pontalba and modelled on Parisian structures, the Pontalba Buildings' liberal use of large cast0iron balconies are reputedly the first such use of these elements in New Orleans, which have now become hallmarks of the district and other parts of the city. Gallier completed the Pontalba Buildings in concert with Henry Howard, characteristic of much of his work during this period when he partnered with several other designers. The London-born architect John Turpin, for example, became a partner in Gallier, Turpin & Company in 1846, and remained partnered with Gallier's son, James, Jr. after Gallier himself retired in 1850, in part due to his poor health.

Notably, Gallier was one of a group of architects who created the idea of architectural practice as division of labor separate from the job of construction: the architect would design the structure for the clients and manage those who had been hired to build them.

== Personal life and death ==
In 1823, while in England, he met and married Elizabeth Tyler. Their only surviving child was James Gallier Jr., who also became an architect. Elizabeth died in July 1844, in her mid-forties.

On 23 June 1850, in Charleston, South Carolina, he married Catherine Maria Robinson of Mobile, Alabama, who was born 18 November 1822, in Hardwick, Massachusetts, to Colonel Joseph Robinson and Ann Maria Ruggles Walton. She was 24 years his junior.

On 3 October 1866, James and Catherine Gallier were passengers on board the Evening Star, a paddle-wheel steamer en route from New York City to New Orleans, when it sank in a hurricane about 175 miles east of Savannah, Georgia. There were only a half-dozen survivors out of approximately 250 people. Nearly a decade after Gallier's death, in November 1875, his son and Catherine's children from her previous marriage went to court to settle his estate. As Katrina Hornung recounts:

As he had married Catherine Robinson later in life, she already had children of her own from a previous marriage (known as the Robinsons) who thought they were entitled to his property against their step-siblings the Galliers. This case was brought before the court in November of 1875. Details of the case are as follows: James Gallier Sr. had written his will to give his estate to his wife. Because they both died in the same incident, she could not inherit the property, so the property would automatically go to James Gallier Jr., James Gallier’s next of kin. This action was brought to court by the Robinson children, who felt they were entitled to the property.

This is where it gets tricky – the court had to try to figure out who died first in the shipwreck. If James Gallier died before his wife then the property would go to her and therefore her successors, but if Catharine died first then the property would stay with James Gallier and go to his next of kin – James Gallier Jr. As the plaintiffs in the case, the Robinsons had to prove that their mother had lived longer than their stepfather.

One of the main points considered was the health and age of the deceased. James Gallier was not only 24 years older than his wife at the time, but he had also been in poor health. It was assumed that with no other information that it was safe to presume that James had died first. But this wasn’t actual proof that he had died first. Many witnesses were called who were at the scene of the Evening Star’s sinking. Two witnesses claimed to have seen Mrs. Gallier without her husband after the boat sunk, but were unable to rescue her.

Before they made their decision, the Judge told the jury, “Your duty is simply to determine the question of survivorship. If Mrs. Gallier is shown to your satisfaction to have survived her husband, you will return a verdict for the plaintiffs; if you are not so convinced, you will return a verdict for the defendants” (ROBINSON v. GALLIER et al.) They decided for James Gallier Jr, the defendant.

== Bibliography ==
- Christovich, Mary Louise., Roulhac Toledano, Betsy Swanson, Pat Holden, Samuel Wilson, and Bernard Lemann. New Orleans Architecture, Volume II: The American Sector (Faubourg St. Mary); Howard Avenue to Iberville Street, Mississippi River to Claiborne Avenue (Gretna, LA: Pelican Publishing, 1972).
- Colvin, Howard. A Biographical Dictionary of British Architects 1600–1840, 3d ed. (London/New Haven: Yale University Press, 1995).
- Gallier, James. Autobiography of James Gallier, Architect (New York: Da Capo, 1973 [1864]).
- Pierson, William H., Jr. American Buildings and Their Architects, vol. 1: The Colonial and Neo-Classical Styles (New York: Anchor, 1976).
- Wilson, Samuel Jr. A Guide to Architecture of New Orleans, 1699–1959 (New Orleans: Louisiana Landmarks Society, 1960).
