= New Orleans City Hall =

New Orleans City Hall may refer to:

- Gallier Hall (1853–1950s)
- New Orleans City Hall at Duncan Plaza, see New Orleans Central Business District § Government and infrastructure (1950s–present)
