= Get Out =

2017 film by Jordan Peele

- Theatrical release poster
- Directed by: Jordan Peele
- Written by: Jordan Peele
- Produced by: Sean McKittrick; Jason Blum; Edward H. Hamm Jr.; Jordan Peele
- Starring: Daniel Kaluuya; Allison Williams; Bradley Whitford; Caleb Landry Jones; Stephen Root; Catherine Keener
- Cinematography: Toby Oliver
- Edited by: Gregory Plotkin
- Music by: Michael Abels
- Production companies: Blumhouse Productions; QC Entertainment; Monkeypaw Productions
- Distributed by: Universal Pictures
- Release dates: January 23, 2017 (Sundance); February 24, 2017 (United States)
- Running time: 104 minutes
- Country: United States
- Language: English
- Budget: $4.5 million
- Box office: $259.9 million

Get Out is a 2017 American psychological horror film written, co-produced, and directed by Jordan Peele in his directorial debut. It stars Daniel Kaluuya, Allison Williams, Lil Rel Howery, LaKeith Stanfield, Bradley Whitford, Caleb Landry Jones, Stephen Root, Catherine Keener, and Betty Gabriel. The plot follows a young black man (Kaluuya), who uncovers shocking secrets when he meets the family of his white girlfriend (Williams).

The film was a commercial success, grossing $259.9 million against a $4.5 million budget, and received universal acclaim for Peele's screenplay and direction, as well as Kaluuya's performance, and was chosen by the National Board of Review, the American Film Institute, and Time magazine as one of the top 10 films of 2017. At the 90th Academy Awards, it was nominated for four awards, Best Picture, Best Director, Best Actor (for Kaluuya), and Best Original Screenplay, winning the latter. Retrospectively, Get Out is considered one of the greatest horror films of the 21st century. In 2021, its screenplay was named the greatest of the 21st century by the Writers Guild of America West, and in 2025, it was named the 8th greatest film of the 21st century by The New York Times.

== Plot ==
On a suburban street at night, a Black man walks alone, talking on his phone. After a car approaches him, the man, sensing trouble, attempts to escape, but is subdued, dragged into the car and driven away.

Six months later, Black photographer Chris Washington travels to upstate New York for a weekend getaway to meet the family of his white girlfriend, Rose Armitage. Upon arrival, he has uncomfortable conversations with Rose's father Dean, a neurosurgeon, and mother Missy, a psychiatrist. Later, Rose's brother Jeremy arrives, and Chris observes eerie behavior from the family's Black staff, Georgina and Walter.

Missy manipulates Chris into an individual hypnotherapy session, using the sound of a spoon stirring in a teacup as a hypnotic trigger, ostensibly to cure his smoking habit. While entranced, he reveals that his mother died in a hit-and-run when he was 11 years old; he feels partially responsible, as he delayed calling for help. At Missy's prompting, his consciousness falls into a dark void she dubs the "sunken place" where his body becomes temporarily paralyzed. The next morning, he finds that he no longer has a desire to smoke.

Dozens of wealthy white guests arrive for the Armitages' annual get-together and continually make uncomfortable remarks toward Chris. Chris meets blind art dealer Jim Hudson, who takes an interest in his photography, and a Black man named Logan King. Like Walter and Georgina, Logan behaves unnaturally, and is married to a white woman thirty years his senior. When Chris photographs Logan with flash on, Logan lunges toward Chris, frantically telling him to "get out." Dean removes him, later explaining the sudden erratic behavior as a seizure.

Chris confides in Rose about his worries, and both ultimately agree to return home. Meanwhile, as the party guests have a silent auction for a photo of him, Chris sends the photo of Logan to his friend, TSA officer Rod Williams. Rod recognizes Logan as Andre Hayworth, a missing man from Brooklyn (and the man who was taken in the opening scene). Chris discovers photos of Rose dating numerous Black individuals, including Walter and Georgina, and he tries to leave, but Jeremy and Dean block the doors. Rose, revealing herself as an accomplice, refuses to give him his keys, and Missy hypnotizes him back to the sunken place.

Awakening strapped to an armchair in the basement, Chris views a video in which Dean's father Roman explains that the Armitage family transplants the brains of wealthy white people into Black bodies to acquire their physical characteristics, leaving the host's consciousness trapped in the "sunken place". Jim then reveals that he is going to be transferred into Chris's body, but maintains that he does not care about the color of Chris's skin and only covets a body with working eyesight. Meanwhile, Rod consults the police, who laugh off his theory about the Armitages.

In another room, Dean begins the transplantation process, removing the top of Jim's skull. Jeremy arrives to retrieve Chris, who has seemingly been hypnotized by a clip of the teacup sound earlier, but Chris awakens and bludgeons him—having blocked the trigger by plugging his ears with cotton stuffing from the armchair. Chris kills Dean, who sets the operating room ablaze, then Missy, then Jeremy when he attacks again. Attempting to escape in Jeremy's Porsche, Chris accidentally hits Georgina, who possesses the brain of Rose's grandmother Marianne. Reminded of his own mother's death, Chris guiltily takes her into the car, but she reawakens and attacks him, causing the car to crash and kill her.

Rose and Walter, who possesses Roman's brain, arrive to capture Chris. During a scuffle, Chris uses his phone's flash to free Walter from Roman's control. Walter shoots Rose with her rifle, then fatally shoots himself. Chris begins strangling Rose, but relents when she manipulatively pleads for her life and promises she loves him. A police car arrives; Rose cries out for help, but Rod emerges from the car and picks up Chris, leaving Rose to bleed out on the road.

== Cast ==
- Daniel Kaluuya as Chris Washington, a young Black photographer who is invited by Rose to her family's house
  - Zailand Adams as 11-year-old Chris
- Allison Williams as Rose Armitage, the white daughter of the Armitage family and Chris's girlfriend
- Bradley Whitford as Dean Armitage, a neurosurgeon and Rose's father
- Caleb Landry Jones as Jeremy Armitage, Rose's brother
- Stephen Root as Jim Hudson, a blind art dealer who is a member of the wealthy Order of the Coagula organization
- LaKeith Stanfield as Andre Hayworth / Logan King, the latter a member of the Order of the Coagula who has taken over the body of Andre, a Black man who had gone missing 6 months prior to the film's events
- Catherine Keener as Missy Armitage, a psychiatrist and Rose's mother
- Lil Rel Howery as Rod Williams, a TSA Airport police officer and Chris's best friend
- Erika Alexander as Detective Latoya
- Marcus Henderson as Walter, the Armitage's Black groundskeeper, who is actually Roman Armitage in Walter's body
- Betty Gabriel as Georgina, a Black housekeeper who is actually Marianne Armitage, the Armitage family matriarch and Rose's grandmother, in Georgina's body
- Richard Herd as Roman Armitage (before having taken over Walter's body), founder of the Order of the Coagula and the patriarch of the Armitage family, also the grandfather of Rose
- Jeronimo Spinx as Detective Drake
- Ian Casselberry as Detective Garcia
- Trey Burvant as Officer Ryan
- Geraldine Singer as Philomena King

Writer-director Jordan Peele voices the sounds made by the wounded deer, and narrates a UNCF commercial.

== Production ==
=== Development ===
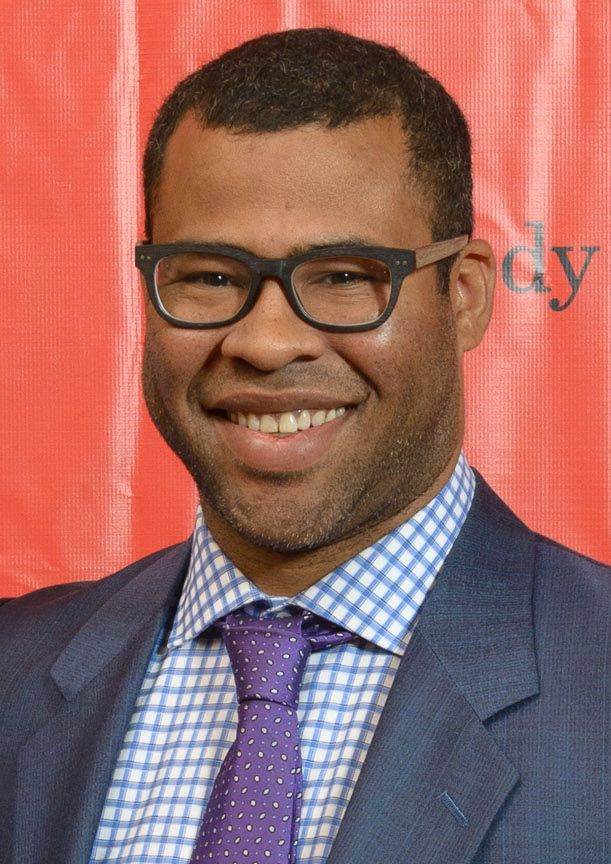
Get Out is Jordan Peele's directorial debut.

Get Out is the directorial debut of Jordan Peele, who had previously worked in comedy, including the sketch show Key & Peele. Peele has said that horror and comedy share similar mechanics (such as timing, rhythm and surprise), and that his comedy background helped inform the film’s approach to tension and reveals. He cited The Stepford Wives (1975) as an influence on its satirical premise. As the film deals with racism, Peele has said the story is personal to him, though not autobiographical.

Peele was introduced to producer Sean McKittrick by comedy partner Keegan-Michael Key in 2013. After Peele pitched the story during a meeting in New Orleans, McKittrick committed to producing and commissioned Peele to write the screenplay; Peele completed the first draft in about two months.

=== Casting ===
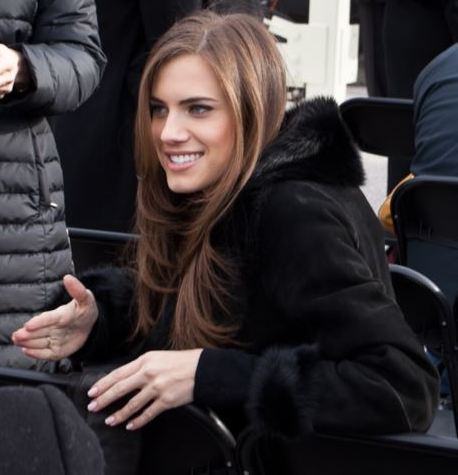
Allison Williams was one of the first actors to be cast in the film.

The lead actors, Daniel Kaluuya and Allison Williams, were cast in November 2015, with other roles cast between December 2015 and February 2016. Kaluuya was cast based on his performance in the Black Mirror episode "Fifteen Million Merits". He has said the role appealed to him because Chris is written as an everyman, and because the party sequence felt recognizable in its social dynamics. Tiffany Haddish was asked to audition for a role in the film but declined.

Peele has said he cast Williams partly to play against audience expectations formed by her earlier roles, making Rose initially appear more trustworthy. Williams later said some viewers—particularly White audiences—misread Rose as a victim rather than a perpetrator, an interpretation she rejected. The moment in which Rose drinks milk while browsing potential victims was added shortly before shooting to heighten the character's detachment, and Peele discussed using the mundane detail as a deliberately unsettling image.

=== Filming ===
Principal photography began on February 16, 2016. Shooting took place in Fairhope, Alabama for three weeks, followed by work at Barton Academy and in the Ashland Place Historic District in midtown Mobile, Alabama. The exterior and interior of the Armitage house were filmed just south of Fairhope. Principal photography lasted 23 days.

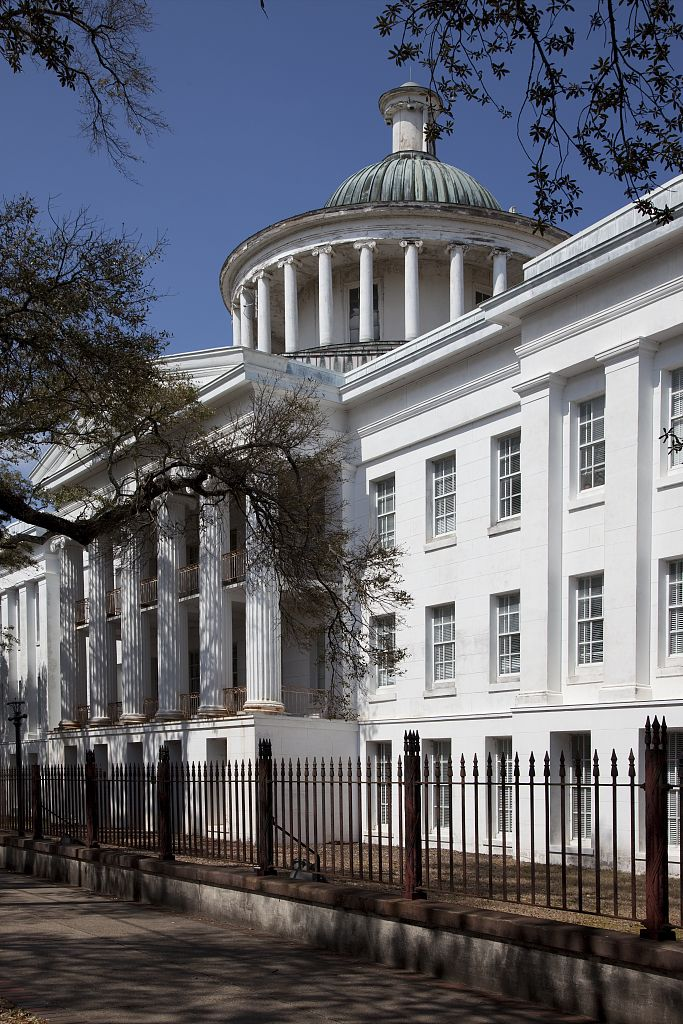
The film was partially shot at Barton Academy, a historic Greek Revival school building in Mobile, Alabama.

Although filmed in Alabama, Peele has said the story was not intended to read as set in the South; he wanted to avoid familiar regional stereotypes and instead place the film's racism within a more outwardly "liberal" social environment. A contemporary report described the film as set in Upstate New York.

Peele has described developing the concept of the "sunken place" from the sensation of falling as one drifts to sleep, and from the idea of being trapped as an observer behind one's own eyes while one's body is controlled by someone else. In the same interview, he connected the idea to themes of abduction and to a metaphor for the prison industrial complex.

Lil Rel Howery has said the film's allegory draws on the historical fears and traumas experienced by African Americans, and he cited events such as racial segregation and the murder of Emmett Till as part of that cultural context. Peele also expressed concerns before release about whether White audiences would resist being implicated as villains, and whether Black audiences would want to see Black characters placed in peril.

==== Alternative endings ====
In the original ending, Chris kills Rose and is arrested by the police; Rod then visits him in jail, where Chris insists the threat has been stopped. Peele has said he originally intended the ending to reflect the realities of racism, but later shifted approach after considering the cultural moment and audience reactions at test screenings, opting for a more hopeful resolution while still preserving a brief moment where viewers might fear Chris will be arrested.

Peele considered several other endings, including one in which Rod finds Chris at the estate but realizes Chris is no longer himself.

=== Music ===
Michael Abels composed the film's score. Peele has said he wanted the music to foreground Black voices and musical traditions, while avoiding genre shorthand such as a "voodoo" motif, and Abels incorporated Swahili vocals along with a blues influence. The refrain "Sikiliza Kwa Wahenga" is Swahili for "listen to your ancestors", and Peele said it functions as a warning directed at Chris and echoes the film's title and premise.

The song "Redbone" by Childish Gambino appears at the beginning of the film. Other songs in the film include "Run, Rabbit, Run" by Flanagan and Allen and "(I've Had) The Time of My Life" by Bill Medley and Jennifer Warnes.

The soundtrack was released on vinyl for the first time in 2018 by Waxwork Records and included an essay by Peele.

== Themes and interpretations ==
Get Out has been described as critical of post-racial America, the concept of "colorblindness", and neoliberalism. Lanre Bakare in The Guardian notes, "The villains here aren't southern rednecks or neo-Nazi skinheads, or the so-called 'alt-right'. They're middle-class White liberals. [...] The thing Get Out does so well—and the thing that will rankle with some viewers—is to show how, however unintentionally, these same people can make life so hard and uncomfortable for black people. It exposes a liberal ignorance and hubris that has been allowed to fester. It's an attitude, an arrogance which in the film leads to a horrific final solution, but in reality leads to a complacency that is just as dangerous."

Peele stated that the character of Hudson, who literally is colorblind due to his physical blindness, "still plays a part in the system of racism", due to his belief that the eyesight of a black photographer will give him an "advantage". Hudson distances himself from the racial context of taking Chris's body, claiming to be only interested in his eyesight and reducing him to an aesthetic.

Scholar Thai-Catherine Matthews draws parallels between Chris and Barack Obama, noting their "suspension" between racial and social identities. Matthews says Obama comes to the conclusion that this "suspension" can foster positive relations in his memoir Dreams from My Father, while Get Out "views suspension as the ultimate hell". Ryan Poll cited the film as an example of Afro-pessimism.

The film also depicts the lack of attention on missing black Americans compared to missing White girls and women. Slate's Damon Young stated the film's premise was "depressingly plausible ... Although black people only comprise 13 percent of America's population, they are 34 percent of America's missing, a reality that exists as the result of a mélange of racial and socioeconomic factors rendering black lives demonstratively less valuable than the lives [of] our White counterparts."

Peele wrote Rose as a subversion of the White savior trope, and in particular, of films where most White characters are evil, but one is good. Peele and Williams stated that Rose behaved like a teenager as her emotional development was delayed. Williams believed that Rose was not a victim of indoctrination, hypnotism, or Stockholm syndrome, but simply evil. After Rose's intentions are revealed, her previous "soft and welcoming" appearance becomes a "vision of cold, meticulous elitism", with hunting jodhpurs, a white dress shirt, and a "sleek ponytail"; she hangs photographs of her ex-partners on her wall like hunting trophies.

== Reception ==
=== Box office ===
Get Out grossed $176 million in the United States and Canada and $79.4 million in other territories for a worldwide gross of $255.5 million, against a production budget of $4.5 million. Deadline Hollywood calculated the net profit of the film to be $124.8 million, when factoring together all expenses and revenues, making it the 10th most profitable release of 2017. Vulture described Get Out's 5.3 multiple (total divided by opening weekend gross) as "staggering".

In North America, Get Out was released on February 24, 2017, alongside Collide and Rock Dog, and was expected to gross $20–25 million from 2,773 theaters in its opening weekend. The film made $1.8 million from Thursday night previews and $10.8 million on its first day. It went on to open for $33.4 million, finishing first at the box office. 38% of the film's opening-weekend audience was African American, while 35% was White, with Georgia being its most profitable market. 90% of its opening weekend ticket sales were purchased at the theater (versus in advance). In its second weekend, the film finished in second at the box office behind new release Logan ($88.4 million), grossing $28.3 million, for a drop of 15.4%. Horror films tend to drop at least 60% in their second weekend, so this was above average. In its third weekend, the film grossed $21.1 million, dropping just 25% from its previous week, and finished third at the box office behind newcomer Kong: Skull Island and Logan.

In March 2017, three weeks after its release, Get Out crossed the $100 million mark domestically, making Peele the first black writer-director to do so with his debut movie. On April 8, 2017, the film became the highest-grossing film domestically directed by a black filmmaker, beating out F. Gary Gray's Straight Outta Compton, which grossed $162.8 million domestically in 2015. Gray reclaimed the record two weeks later when The Fate of the Furious grossed $173.3 million on its fourteenth day of release on April 27. Domestically, Get Out is also the highest-grossing debut film based on an original screenplay in Hollywood history, beating the two-decade-long record of 1999's The Blair Witch Project ($140.5 million). By the end of March, Los Angeles Times had declared the film's success a "cultural phenomenon" noting that in addition to its box office success, "moviegoers have shared countless 'sunken place' Internet memes and other Get Out-inspired fan art across social media." Josh Rottenberg, the editor of the piece, attributed the film's success to the fact that it was released "at one of the most politically charged moments in memory."

=== Critical response ===
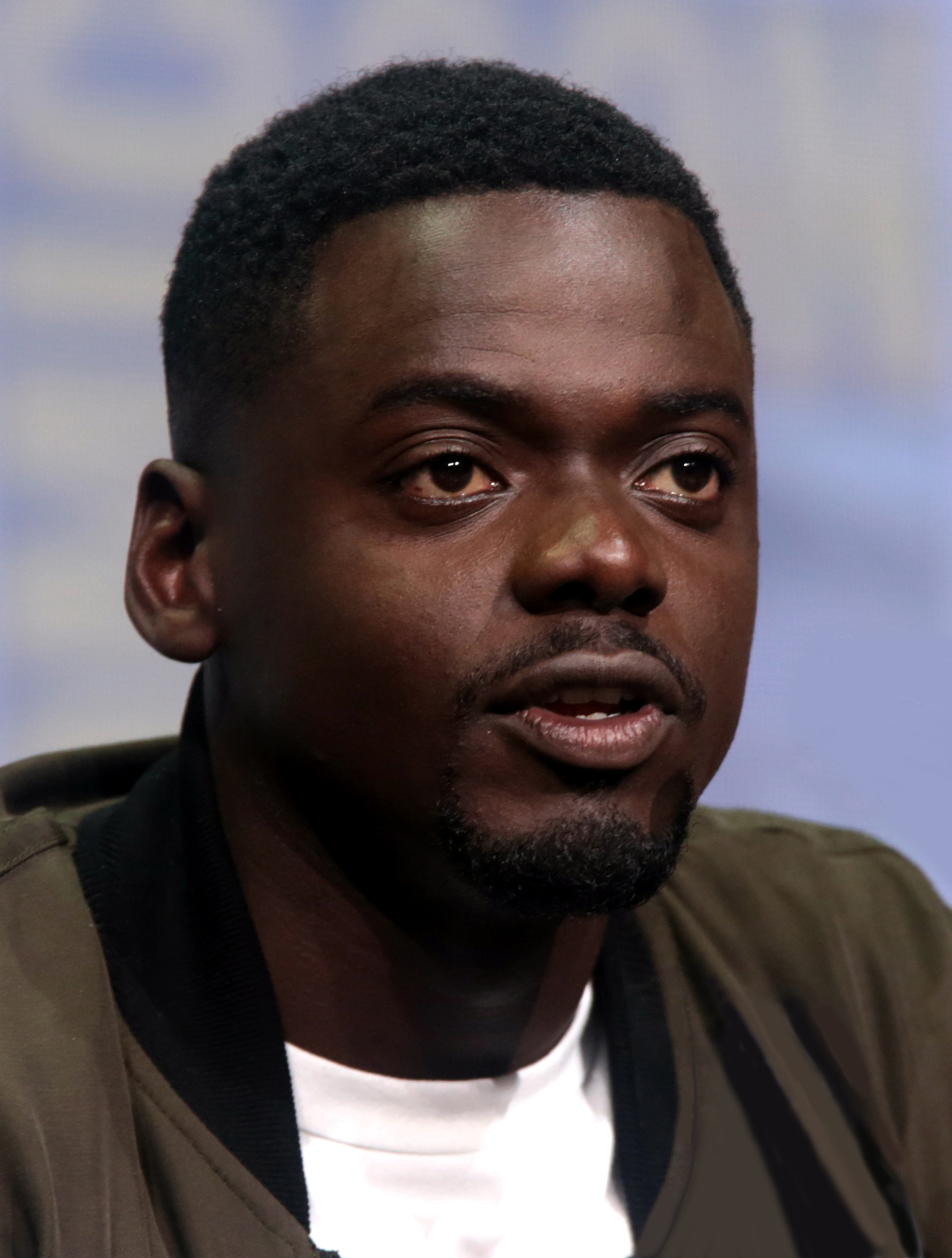
Daniel Kaluuya's performance garnered universal acclaim and he received his first Academy Award, BAFTA, Golden Globe, SAG, and Critics' Choice Award nominations.

On review aggregation website Rotten Tomatoes, the film has an approval rating of 98% based on 403 reviews, and an average rating of 8.30/10. The critical consensus reads, "Funny, scary, and thought-provoking, Get Out seamlessly weaves its trenchant social critiques into a brilliantly effective and entertaining horror/comedy thrill ride." The film was the highest rated wide release of 2017 on the site. On Metacritic, the film has an average weighted score of 85 out of 100, based on 48 critics, indicating "universal acclaim". Audiences polled by CinemaScore gave the film an average grade of "A−" on an A+ to F scale, while PostTrak reported filmgoers gave an 84% overall positive score and a 66% "definite recommend".

Greg Falla's book, Sado Mass Essayist: Certified Loverboy, Certified Cinephile, noted Peele's movie as the start of a new era of horror he dubbed "Nu-Wave American Cerebral Horror". Falla explained that the movement is categorized by absurdist premises framing social narratives.

Richard Roeper gave the film 3 1/2 stars, saying: "the real star of the film is writer-director Jordan Peele, who has created a work that addresses the myriad levels of racism, pays homage to some great horror films, carves out its own creative path, has a distinctive visual style—and is flat-out funny as well." Keith Phipps of Uproxx praised the cast and Peele's direction, saying, "That he brings the technical skill of a practiced horror master is more of a surprise. The final thrill of Get Out—beyond the slow-building sense of danger, the unsettling atmosphere, and the twisty revelation of what's really going on—is that Peele's just getting started." Mike Rougeau of IGN gave the film 9/10, and wrote, "Get Out's whole journey, through every tense conversation, A-plus punchline and shocking act of violence, feels totally earned. And the conclusion is worth each uncomfortable chuckle and moment of doubt." Peter Travers of Rolling Stone gave Get Out a 3.5 out of 4, and called it a "jolt-a-minute horrorshow laced with racial tension and stinging satirical wit." Scott Mendelson of Forbes said the film captured the zeitgeist and called it a "modern American horror classic".

Critic Armond White gave a negative review in National Review, referring to the film as a "Get-Whitey movie" and stating that it "[reduces] racial politics to trite horror-comedy ... it's an Obama movie for Tarantino fans." The New York Observer critic Rex Reed included the film on his list of 10 Worst Films of 2017, and later sardonically stated in a CBS Sunday Morning interview, "I didn't care if all the black men are turned into robots." A writer on Sunday Morning's website noted that there are no robots in the film.

In 2018, IndieWire writers ranked the script the third best American screenplay of the 21st century, with Chris O'Falt arguing that Peele "walked a narrative tightrope that required as much craft as insight [...] the audience's understanding of what Chris (Daniel Kaluuya) is thinking and feeling is always clear. Hitchcock-like in its execution, and playing off genre and audience expectation (especially about how racial dynamics are traditionally portrayed on screen), the twists and turns of Get Out are not only gasp-inducing; each one reveals a new layer to its exploration of systematic racist belief systems."

=== Accolades ===
At the 90th Academy Awards, the film won an Oscar for Best Original Screenplay and was nominated in three other categories: Best Picture, Best Director, and Best Actor for Daniel Kaluuya. Peele became the third person (after Warren Beatty and James L. Brooks) to earn Best Picture, Director and Screenplay nominations for a debut film, and the first African-American winner for Best Original Screenplay (and fourth overall nominated, after John Singleton, Spike Lee, and Suzanne de Passe). It also became the 6th horror film to be nominated for best picture, after The Exorcist, Jaws, The Sixth Sense, The Silence of the Lambs and Black Swan.

Get Out divided Oscar voters, with many older members of the Academy of Motion Picture Arts and Sciences dismissing the film or declining to watch it. According to Vulture, new voting members said they ran into "interference" from more senior members when it came to evaluating the film as Best Picture. "I had multiple conversations with longtime Academy members who were like, 'That was not an Oscar film,'" according to a new voter. "Honestly, a few of them had not even seen it and they were saying it, so dispelling that kind of thing has been super important." One anonymous Oscar voter told The Hollywood Reporter they felt alienated by the Oscar campaign: "Instead of focusing on the fact that this was an entertaining little horror movie that made quite a bit of money, they started trying to suggest it had deeper meaning than it does, and, as far as I'm concerned, they played the race card, and that really turned me off. In fact, at one of the luncheons, the lead actor [Kaluuya], who is not from the United States, was giving us a lecture on racism in America and how black lives matter, and I thought, 'What does this have to do with Get Out? They're trying to make me think that if I don't vote for this movie, I'm a racist.' I was really offended."

At the 75th Golden Globe Awards, Get Out received two nominations: Best Motion Picture – Musical or Comedy and Best Actor – Comedy or Musical for Daniel Kaluuya. The submission in the comedy category prompted debate about the premise of the film. Although advertised as a "satirical horror film," Universal Pictures submitted it as a comedy because of less competition in the category, which gave the film a greater chance of receiving accolades. Peele joked in a tweet, "Get Out is a documentary," but it was reported he approved of the submission.

The film also received nominations at the 24th Screen Actors Guild Awards, 49th NAACP Image Awards, and 23rd Critics' Choice Awards, among others. It won Best Foreign International Film at the British Independent Film Awards. At the 33rd Independent Spirit Awards on March 3, 2018, Jordan Peele won the Best Director Award and the film won Best Picture.

In 2021, the Writers Guild of America ranked the screenplay the greatest of the 21st century so far. In the decennial critics' poll published by the British Film Institute's magazine Sight and Sound in 2022, Get Out was tied for the 95th greatest film of all time. In June 2025, the film ranked number 8 on The New York Times' list of "The 100 Best Movies of the 21st Century". In July 2025, it ranked number 22 on Rolling Stone's list of "The 100 Best Movies of the 21st Century" and number 2 on The Hollywood Reporter's list of the "25 Best Horror Movies of the 21st Century."

== See also ==
- List of Afrofuturist films
- List of black films of the 2010s
- List of directorial debuts
- Race in horror films
- The Skeleton Key – 2005 film by Iain Softley
