= James H. Dakin =

American architect (1806–1852)

James Harrison Dakin (August 24, 1806 – May 13, 1852) was an American architect who designed Neo-Gothic buildings and was the architect for the Old Louisiana State Capitol, Old Bank of Louisville, and other public buildings.

== Early life ==
Dakin was the son of James (1783–1819) and Lucy Harrison Dakin (1784–1826) of Hudson, New York, and born in Northeast Township. He was seventh in line from the immigrant ancestor, Thomas Dakin, of Concord, Massachusetts, through Simon, of the third generation, who went to Putnam County, New York, from Massachusetts. After learning the carpentry trade from his uncle, James Dakin moved to New York City, where he was apprenticed to Alexander Jackson Davis when the firm of Town and Davis, Architects, was formed in 1829. That year he married Joanna Belcher (1796–1882) of Norwich, Connecticut, the widow of George Collard. They had seven children including two pairs of twins, with just two children surviving to adulthood.

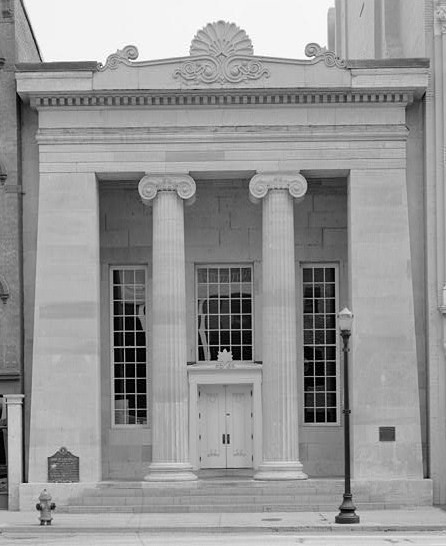
Old Bank of Louisville building in 1987

Dakin seems from an early date to have developed a practice of his own, for he was the architect of the large J. W. Perry house, in Brooklyn, in about 1830–31, and of the Washington Square Dutch Reformed Church, an unusually advanced example of Gothic Revival work. He also was in touch with Minard Lafever during this period and, a beautiful draftsman drew a number of the plates, which are signed by him, in Lafever's The Modern Builder's Guide. Apparently, too, he had some means. From May 1, 1832, to November 1, 1834, he was a partner of Town & Davis (now renamed Town, Davis and Dakin, Architects), and from existing accounts of the firm, he seems to have contributed a generous amount of working capital. The partnership ended in some disagreement; a letter from Ithiel Town to Davis indicates that Dakin, owing to his investment in the firm, considered he had a greater right to dictate policies than the older partners could countenance. During this period Town & Davis were engaged on many important works, including the North Carolina State Capitol (1832), the main building of New York University (1833; an influential Gothic collegiate work for which Dakin and Town did most of the design), and the Marine Pavilion (a luxurious hotel) at Rockaway; Dakin's name appears as one of the architects of the last two.

== Life as an architect ==
It was at this time that the firm employed James Gallier for some four months at $2.00 a day. Here Gallier met Dakin's younger brother, Charles Bingley Dakin (1811–1839), then working as a draftsman at James Dakin's firm and whom Gallier took along to New Orleans in 1834. That year, having left Town, Davis and Dakin to establish his own firm in New York, Dakin designed one of the finest buildings of his career, the Bank of Louisville in Kentucky, as well as the First Presbyterian Church in Troy, New York, done in the Greek Revival style.

In 1835, James Dakin followed his brother and Gallier to New Orleans. Ambitious, he realized, as Gallier had, the opportunities New Orleans offered. For a time there seems to have been a loose partnership between the three. One example of their collaboration is Barton Academy in Mobile, Alabama, started in 1835. Both James Dakin and James Gallier claimed to have been the architects of certain New Orleans buildings of the period.

Within a year, however, the Dakins left Gallier and practiced for time together as Dakin & Dakin and as Dakin, Bell & Dakin; later on they split. Charles began an ill-fated branch office in Mobile, where he supervised the construction of the Government Street Presbyterian Church, completed in 1836. The collapse of a row of warehouses he designed affected him so deeply that it is thought to have been a cause contributing to his early death in St. Gabriel, Louisiana. He had gone to Texas to begin anew. That year (1839) the Great Fire of Mobile also destroyed much of the firm's incomplete work there.

James Dakin's work with Gallier (1835) included Christ Church, the front of which is preserved as a Knights of Columbus clubhouse (1835–37), the Verandah Hotel (1837–38), and the Merchants' Exchange (1835–36) on Royal Street. In 1838 he designed St. Patrick's Church, an ambitious effort in a rich Gothic style, supposedly modeled on York Minster. When difficulties occurred in its construction, Gallier was called in to revise the foundations and Dakin lost the contract in 1839. Ever afterward Gallier erroneously claimed it as one of his buildings. Dakin was also architect of the Methodist Episcopal Church (burned with the St. Charles Hotel), of "Union Terrace" (1836–37) on Canal Street, of the State Arsenal (1839), and of the gracious row of thirteen houses on Julia Street known as the "Thirteen Buildings" or the Julia Street Row.

At this time, too, Dakin, Bell & Dakin were employed as the architects of a proposed city hall for New Orleans, but the project was abandoned and the architects paid and discharged by the City Council on March 28, 1837. The relation of this design to Gallier's later City Hall, if any, is not known. There is also evidence that the Dakin brothers were the architects of several unidentified buildings in Cincinnati and St. Louis. James Dakin carried on after his brother's death, designing the Gayoso House Hotel in Memphis, Tennessee (1842), and the Medical College of Louisiana (1843). By 1845 he had accepted as an apprentice Henry Howard, among the best of the next generation of Louisiana architects. After 1848 James lived chiefly at Baton Rouge.

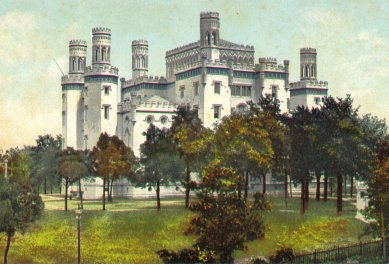
Old Louisiana State Capitol

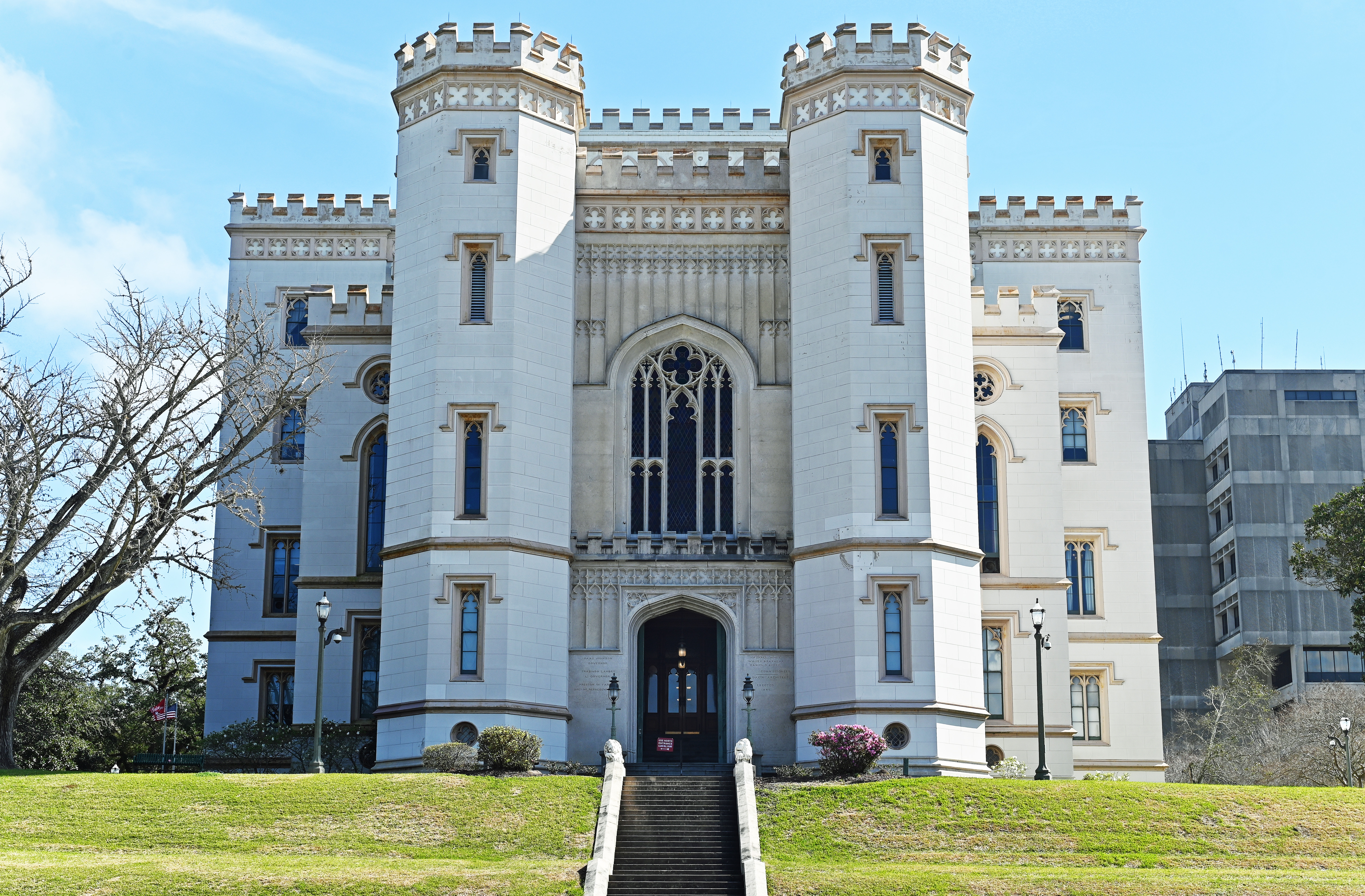
Western side of the old Louisiana State Capitol

During the Mexican–American War James H. Dakin served briefly in 1846 as colonel of the 2nd Louisiana Volunteers. He returned to design the University of Louisiana, adjacent to the Medical College. The latter was absorbed by the university, and the entire complex ultimately became Tulane University. In 1847 he won a competition for the new statehouse with a daring Gothic design, a style he chose "because no other style ... could give suitable character to a building with so little cost" and because to use classic would give a building "which would appear to be a mere copy of some other edifice already erected and often repeated in every city and town of our country." Having moved to Baton Rouge, he supervised the capitol's construction until 1850.

Dakin left the capitol job with only interior detailing unfinished to become the architect for the New Orleans Custom House. He found the original design by Alexander Thompson Wood unsatisfactory and proposed instead a freestanding, cast-iron frame and a central courtyard for air circulation. But a political and sociological dispute arose between Creole and Anglo-Saxon factions over the changes. To create the courtyard for air and ventilation, Dakin proposed moving the main banking room from the center to the Canal Street front. The Creoles of the French Quarter objected that that would give the Anglo-American sector across Canal Street a business advantage. Creole Democratic congressmen debated the change on the floor of Congress. Dakin, a friend of the Whig president, Zachary Taylor, was ousted after a heated hearing in which the great architect Isaiah Rogers sided with Dakin. He returned to Baton Rouge, where he completed the capitol interior. He died there after "a long and painful illness."

As a designer Dakin was forceful and original and his influence was disseminated in many ways. The Perry house in Brooklyn (remarkable for its conservatory wings) and the Julia Buildings show a competent use of the current Greek Revival forms. But it is in the Gothic of St. Patrick's and the Old Louisiana State Capitol that his originality best appears; the interior of the former, with its intricate plaster ribbing and cleverly top-lighted sanctuary, and the varied and forceful masses of the latter, together with its original plan and fancifully delicate woodwork (renewed after a fire in 1887), reveal him as a man with marked imagination.

The location of his major buildings in highly visible places, like the Mississippi River levees in Baton Rouge, Memphis, and New Orleans—the river was the highway of the time—and the New York University campus in New York City helped draw attention to his highly imaginative designs and set lofty professional standards. Dakin also provided many engravings for Minard Lafever's architectural books, which became builders' handbooks all over America. Dakin had been honored in the 1830s by an invitation to become one of the founding members of the American Institution of Architects, forerunner of the American Institute of Architects. The spread of ideas on architecture and mutual support marked their activities.

== Projects ==
- Old Louisiana State Capitol
- Old Bank of Louisville
- Gayoso Hotel in Memphis, Tennessee
