= 1010 Common =

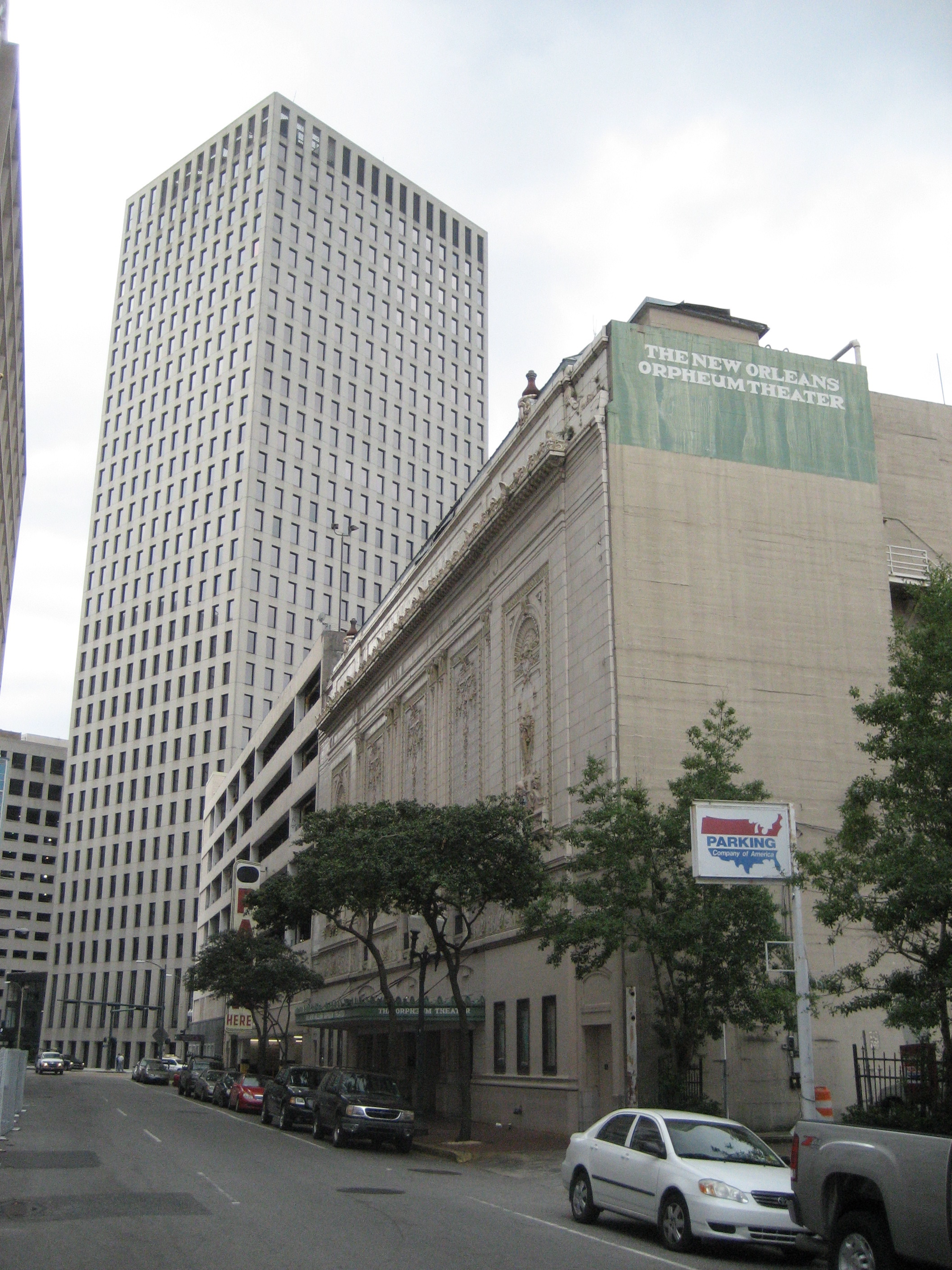

General information
- Type: Office
- Location: 1010 Common Street; New Orleans, LA; United States
- Coordinates: 29°57′13″N 90°4′25″W
- Completed: 1970

Height
- Antenna spire: N/A
- Roof: 438 ft (134 m)

Technical details
- Floor count: 31
- Floor area: 512,593 sq ft (47,621.4 m^{2})

Design and construction
- Architect: Skidmore, Owings & Merrill

- Bank of New Orleans Building
- U.S. National Register of Historic Places
- NRHP reference No.: 16000712
- Added to NRHP: October 11, 2016

1010 Common (formerly the Bank of New Orleans Building), located at 1010 Common Street in the Central Business District of New Orleans, Louisiana, is a 31-story skyscraper. The building, designed by Skidmore, Owings & Merrill and completed in 1970, is an example of the international style typical of the time. It is located adjacent to the 14-story Latter Center Garage & Annex.

It was listed on the National Register of Historic Places in 2016.

The Fairmont New Orleans hotel occupies 17 floors, with 250 rooms. It is scheduled to open on November 2, 2026.

== See also ==
- List of tallest buildings in New Orleans
- National Register of Historic Places listings in Orleans Parish, Louisiana
