= American quarter =

American quarter or American Quarter may refer to:

- Quarter (United States coin), the 25-cent (quarter-dollar) denomination in American currency
- American Quarter Horse, a U.S.-originating horse breed
- The American Quarter, another name for the New Orleans Central Business District (by contrast with the famed French Quarter)
