= Henry Vernon Atherton =

American professor

- Born: November 12, 1923; Eden, Vermont, U.S.
- Died: March 1, 2016 (aged 92); Burlington, Vermont, U.S.
- Education: Pennsylvania State University; University of Vermont
- Scientific career
- Fields: Animal Science
- Workplaces: University of Vermont

Henry Vernon Atherton (November 12, 1923 – March 1, 2016) was a Professor of Animal Science at the University of Vermont Extension, WWII veteran and pioneer in the dairy industry.

== Early years ==
Born in Eden, Vermont on November 12, 1923, the third and youngest son of Phineas Alger Atherton (1907–1974) and Maude Lillian Marckres (1885–1980). His family were farmers in the Vermont dairy industry.

Atherton graduated from Barton Academy as class valedictorian in 1941; received a B.S. degree, cum laude, in dairy manufacturing in 1948, and an M.S. degree in 1950, both from the University of Vermont; and a PhD in dairy technology from Pennsylvania State University in 1953.

== Career ==
Atherton became a pioneering investigator on the influence of bulk-milk cooling on the quality of milk and dairy products.

Atherton has been described as a leading researcher in the 100-year history of the American Dairy Science Association. He worked to increase public knowledge of cheeses consumed in the United States. He served as Extension Dairy Specialist and faculty member in the University of Vermont's Department of Animal Sciences from 1953 to 1989, and his work focused on the quality of milk stored in refrigerated bulk tanks.

Atherton was a founding member of the Dairy Practices Council, and president of the Vermont Dairy Industry Association, and served on several national boards in the dairy industry. He worked with the Department of the Interior and the Environmental Protection Agency to establish farm water quality criteria.

Atherton was a professor of animal and dairy husbandry at the University of Vermont. He retired in 1989, and in 2010 he received the Sinclair Cup Award for lifetime achievement, and was elected to the Vermont Agricultural Hall of Fame.

The University of Vermont holds a historical account of his life and academic career, including audio interviews

== Personal ==
Atherton married to Phyllis Marie Hardy (1924–2017), the daughter of Wayland and Alice Hardy, on August 24, 1947. They had 3 children; William, Larry and Robert Atherton. 11 grandchildren and 12 great-grandchildren.

He died in Burlington, Vermont on March 1, 2016.
