= Alfred G. Ward =

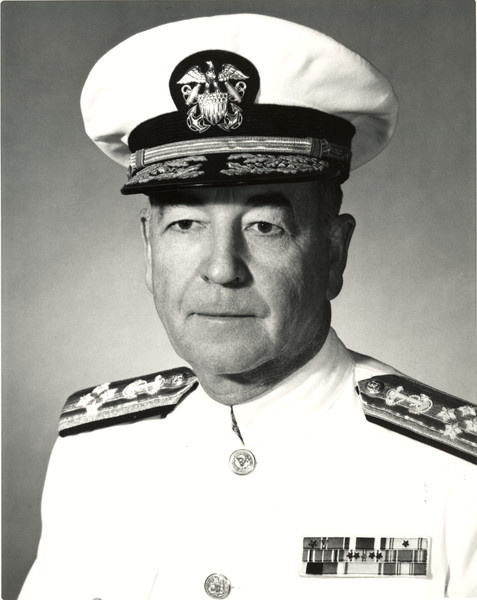
- Born: November 29, 1908; Mobile, Alabama, U.S.
- Died: April 3, 1982 (aged 73); Perryville, Maryland, U.S.
- Military career
- Allegiance: United States of America
- Branch: United States Navy
- Service years: 1932–1968
- Rank: Admiral
- Commands: Second Fleet, Strike Fleet, Atlantic, U.S. Military Representative, NATO Military Committee

Alfred Gustave Ward (November 29, 1908 – April 3, 1982) was an admiral in the United States Navy.

== Life and career ==
A native of Mobile, Alabama, Ward was educated at the Barton Academy in his home town and at the United States Naval Academy; graduating from the latter school in 1928. He then studied at the Massachusetts Institute of Technology where he earned a master's degree in electrical engineering. He later became a graduate of the Naval War College.

Ward served as a gunnery officer on the USS North Carolina (BB-55) during World War II. He was awarded two bronze stars for his work during this war. He then served as the commander of first a destroyer division in the Mediterranean Sea, and then a cruiser division in the Pacific Ocean.

In 1960 Ward was appointed assistant chief of naval operations and in 1962 he took command of the United States Second Fleet after a stint as commander of United States amphibious operations. During the Cuban Missile Crisis of 1962, Ward, then commander of the Second Fleet and Strike Fleet, Atlantic, was also responsible for supervising the blockade of Cuba. From 1965 to 1968, he was assigned as U.S. Military Representative, NATO Military Committee.

Ward died in 1982 at the Perry Point Veterans Administration Medical Center.
