= Government Street Presbyterian Church =

Historic church in Alabama, United States

- U.S. National Register of Historic Places
- U.S. National Historic Landmark
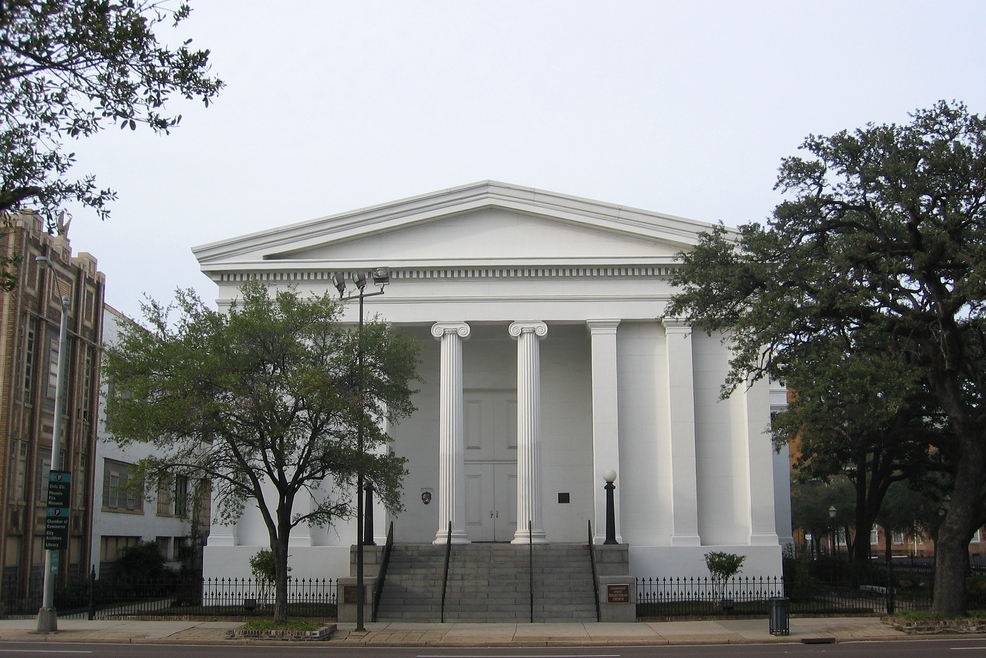
- Government Street Presbyterian Church in 2007.

- Location within Mobile, Alabama Location within Alabama Location within the United States
- Location: 300 Government Street; Mobile, Alabama, US
- Coordinates: 30°41′22″N 88°2′40″W
- Built: 1836-37
- Architects: James Gallier, James Dakin, and Charles Dakin
- Architectural style: Greek Revival
- NRHP reference No.: 92001885

Significant dates
- Added to NRHP: October 5, 1992
- Designated NHL: October 5, 1992

Government Street Presbyterian Church in Mobile, Alabama is one of the oldest and least-altered Greek Revival church buildings in the United States. The architectural design is by James Gallier Sr., James H. Dakin, and Charles Dakin. The trio also designed Barton Academy, four blocks down Government Street to the west. Government Street Presbyterian reflects the influences of Ithiel Town, Minard Lafever, and Andrew Jackson Downing. It was declared a National Historic Landmark in 1992.

== History ==
The Government Street Presbyterian Church congregation was formally organized in 1831. It initially met in a frame building on Government Street. A lot at the corner of Government and Jackson Street was purchased for $10,000 in the spring of 1835. Local millionaire and church trustee, Henry Hitchcock, ran an ad in the Mobile Daily Register in December 1835 that advertised for builders. Hitchcock served on the church's building committee and financed much of the construction to come. The drawings and specifications had already been provided by Gallier and Dakin.

Construction of the new brick edifice commenced on February 13, 1836. The masonry had been completed by March 1837, with one of the architects, Charles Dakin, being married within the sanctuary on March 22, 1837. In June that year the newspaper announced that pews were now being rented. The construction costs eventually totaled $60,000, with $40,000 of that having gone to the mason, Thomas James.

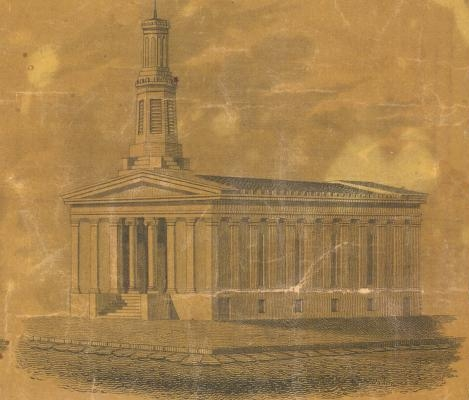
An 1838 engraving of the church before the steeple was destroyed.

In 1852 the steeple was struck by lightning and subsequently removed due to the structural damage. A committee was formed to determine if it was desirable to rebuild it, and the ladies of the church formed a "steeple society" to raise the funds for the construction. The committee later decided to recommend that the congregation not replace it.

A cypress floor was installed over the existing stone floor in the basement level in 1869. In 1893 the pulpit was altered and the doors were removed from the pews. In 1898 electric lighting was introduced, replacing the gas fixtures.

In 1902 a building committee was formed to explore adding more space to the church for a Sunday School. Architects F. Lockwood and Walter Seymour were hired in June 1903 to design an addition. The new addition was finished in 1905 and crossed the back of the existing structure, forming a T-shape. It matched the existing structure in detail and scale. The new construction cost around $12,000. The main sanctuary windows of clear glass were replaced with stained glass at this time.

A hurricane in 1916 caused $2500 in unspecified damages, and it was decided at that time to further enlarge the rear portion of the church. This time the architect was C. L. Hutchinson. He added two bays to the north at a cost of $20,000. The main sanctuary was renovated in 1950 with modern lighting and the addition of a glass vestibule just inside the main entrance. The interior was painted and the pews reupholstered in 1976.

== Design ==
Although records do not indicate which architect was responsible for individual portions of the building, consensus among scholars usually credits the exterior design to James Gallier and Charles Dakin, with the interior credited to the Dakin brothers. The influence of the Town and Davis school on Gallier and the Dakins is evident in the exterior design, with Government Street Presbyterian being extremely similar to Town and Davis' Washington Street Methodist Episcopal Church, completed in 1832 in Brooklyn, New York.

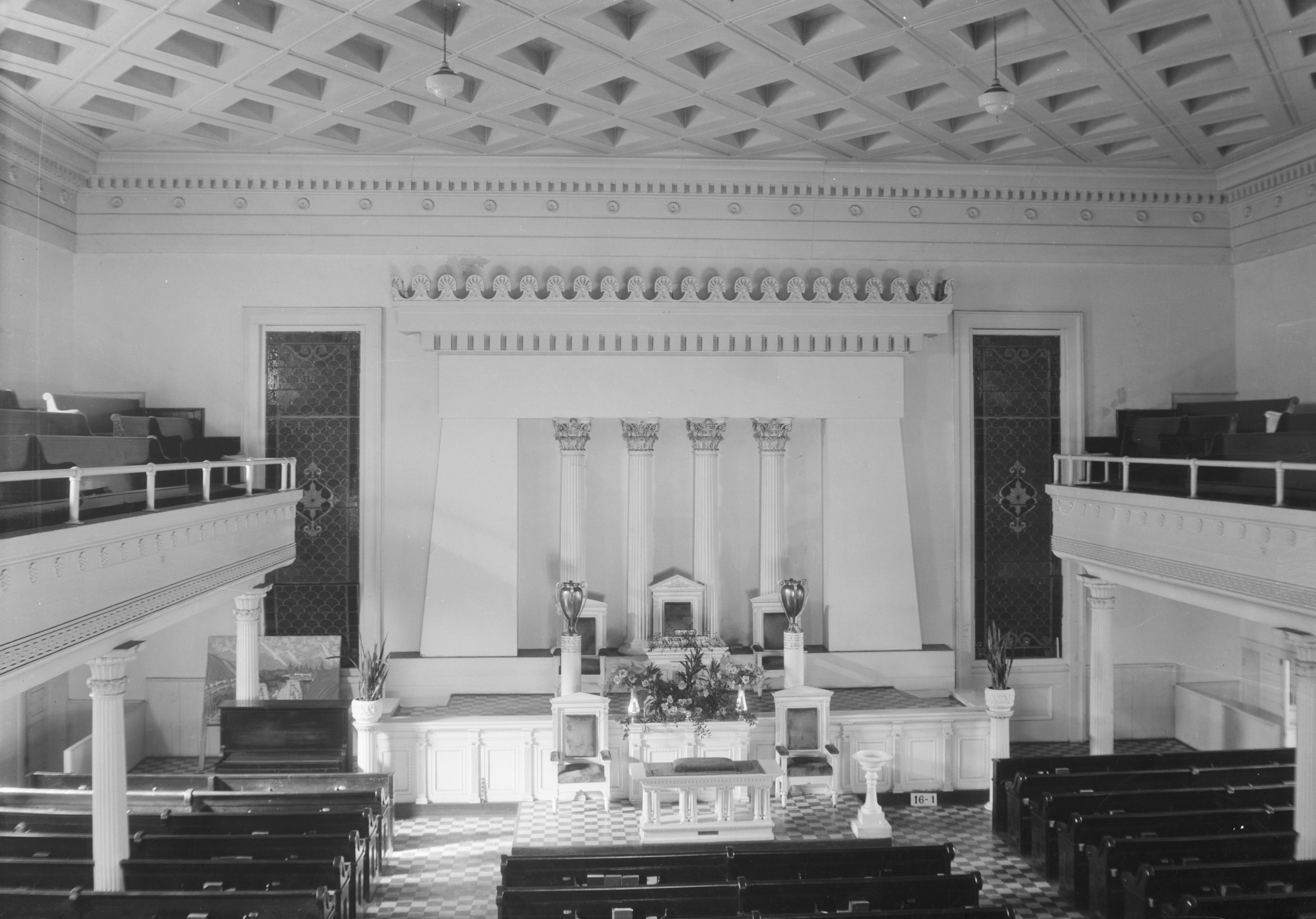
The interior as seen from the rear gallery, looking toward the altar, in 1934.

The exterior is brick with a stucco finish, intended to have an ashlar appearance. The front elevation features one of the earliest surviving American examples of a distyle in antis portico. The side elevations feature bays with full-length windows, divided by pilasters. The structure is one story over a raised basement with granite foundations and steps, the granite having arrived from New England aboard the Comet on September 26, 1836. The front and rear gables are pedimented and were originally adorned with ante-fixae. The front gable had a two-step, battered octagonal steeple that was destroyed in 1852 and was never rebuilt.

The interior is notable for the fact that the original Greek Revival design is fully intact with very little alteration. Three entrances lead from the portico into the sanctuary, the southern main doors open directly into the main vestibule, the eastern and western doors both open into side stairway vestibules that access the sanctuary and upper gallery. The sanctuary has two aisles and retains the original pews. The U-shaped gallery is supported by fluted Corinthian columns of a Tower of the Winds design. The gallery balcony features a Greek key molding topped with rosettes and appears, as does most of the interior, to be based on a design from Minard Lafever's Beauties of Modern Architecture. Behind the altar is a pylon-like screen with an engaged Corinthian tetrasyle topped by ante-fixae, similar in design to the Choragic Monument of Lysicrates. The ceiling is coffered in a diagonal, diamond pattern.

== Organ ==
In the year 2000, the church underwent a major renovation of the facility. During this time, an organ committee was formed to consider replacing the failing 1903 Estey organ. The committee selected the European builder Rieger-Kloss of Krnov, Czech Republic to build a new instrument capable of leading congregational and chorale singing, and recital and performance of any literature written for organ. The result is a 62-rank instrument over six divisions: great, swell, positiv, grand choir, en chamade, and pedal. Controlled by a four-manual and pedal detached English console, the organ was designed to match the architectural and aesthetic properties of the sanctuary. It is situated in the south gallery among three cabinets with the central cabinet containing the positiv division in the German-baroque voicing and style, with the diatonic 8' and 16' en chamade residing atop the case. The console is positioned center and forward the central case and is on a moveable platform. In 2018, the organ console technology was updated and expanded to include harpsichord and carillon stops. The organ is made available to organists and students wishing to rehearse by contacting the church office. The official information may be found here.

== The church today ==
Government Street Presbyterian Church is part of the Presbyterian Church (U.S.A.), in the Presbytery of South Alabama. It is a congregation of over 480 members. The church has worship services, Christian education, music and fine arts, and urban ministries. The church also hosts a weekly lunch and lecture forum for the local community and an annual memorial lecture series. Church members serve downtown Mobile through such ministries as Coffee Club, which has served daily breakfast to the homeless for 22 years, Meals on Wheels, Adopt-A-School, and as a member church of the Interfaith Hospitality Network. During the summer, the church runs an urban mission camp at its Baytreat Lodge facility.

== See also ==
- List of National Historic Landmarks in Alabama
- National Register of Historic Places listings in Mobile, Alabama
