= Bank of New Orleans =

Bank in Metairie, Louisiana, USA

Louisiana Bancorp, Inc.
- Industry: Banking
- Founded: 1909
- Defunct: September 15, 2015
- Fate: Acquired by Home Bancorp, Inc.
- Headquarters: Metairie, Louisiana
- Key people: Lawrence J. LeBon, III, Chairman, President & CEO; John LeBlanc, CFO
- Total assets: $333 million (2014)
- Total equity: $58 million (2014)
- Number of employees: 70 (2014)

Bank of New Orleans (BNO) was a bank headquartered in Metairie, Louisiana. It was a subsidiary of Louisiana Bancorp, Inc., a bank holding company. It operated four branches, all of which were in Louisiana, including a branch at 1010 Common. In 2015, the company was acquired by Home Bancorp, Inc.

== History ==
The bank was founded in 1909.

On July 9, 2007, it became a public company via an initial public offering by its holding company, Louisiana Bancorp, as part of the bank's conversion from mutual to stock form.

In 2008, the bank declined to receive an investment from the United States Department of the Treasury as part of the Troubled Asset Relief Program.

On September 15, 2015, the bank was acquired by Home Bancorp, Inc. for $75 million.
