= Loft 523 =

Coordinates: 29°57′3.7″N 90°4′5.8″W

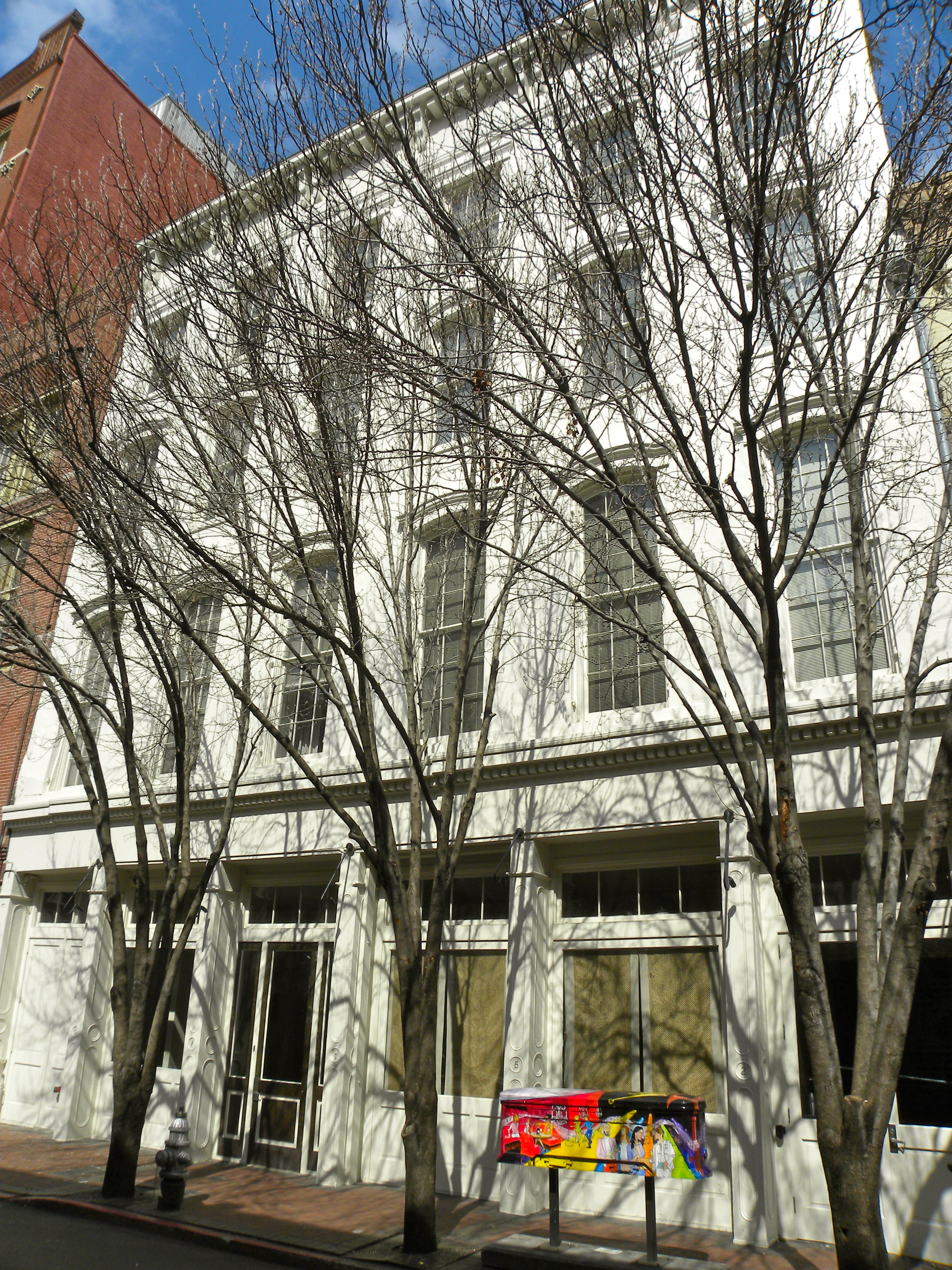
Exterior view of Loft 523, February 2011

Loft 523 is a boutique hotel located at 523 Gravier Street in New Orleans, Louisiana, in the New Orleans Central Business District. The building was erected in the 1880s as a carriage and dry-goods warehouse, and it was purchased and renovated by real-estate developer Sean Cummings. It features eighteen loft style guestrooms, three of which are penthouses.

== Minimalist design ==
Loft 523's style has been described by Frommers as "Jetsons-futuristic-meets-New York City-minimalist fantasy", incorporating modern design, as well as elements that reference the building's origins. A desk in the lobby was made from cypress beams salvaged from the renovation, and the rooms feature stained concrete floors and doors clad in hand-hammered copper. Elements of the original structure can be seen throughout the building, including exposed plasterwork, cast-iron columns, and raw timber beams. Revealing elements of its history as a warehouse, many of the rooms have twelve-foot ceilings and full-length windows.

The rooms are designed to resemble loft apartments, rather than traditional hotel rooms, and they are numbered apartment-style (1A, 2B, etc.) Furniture and fixtures include Agape "Spoon" tubs, Fortuny floor lamps, and platform beds by local craftsman Shane Porter. Two of the penthouses have rooftop aquatic Zen gardens.
