= St. Patrick's Church (New Orleans) =

Historic church in Louisiana, United States

- U.S. National Register of Historic Places
- U.S. National Historic Landmark
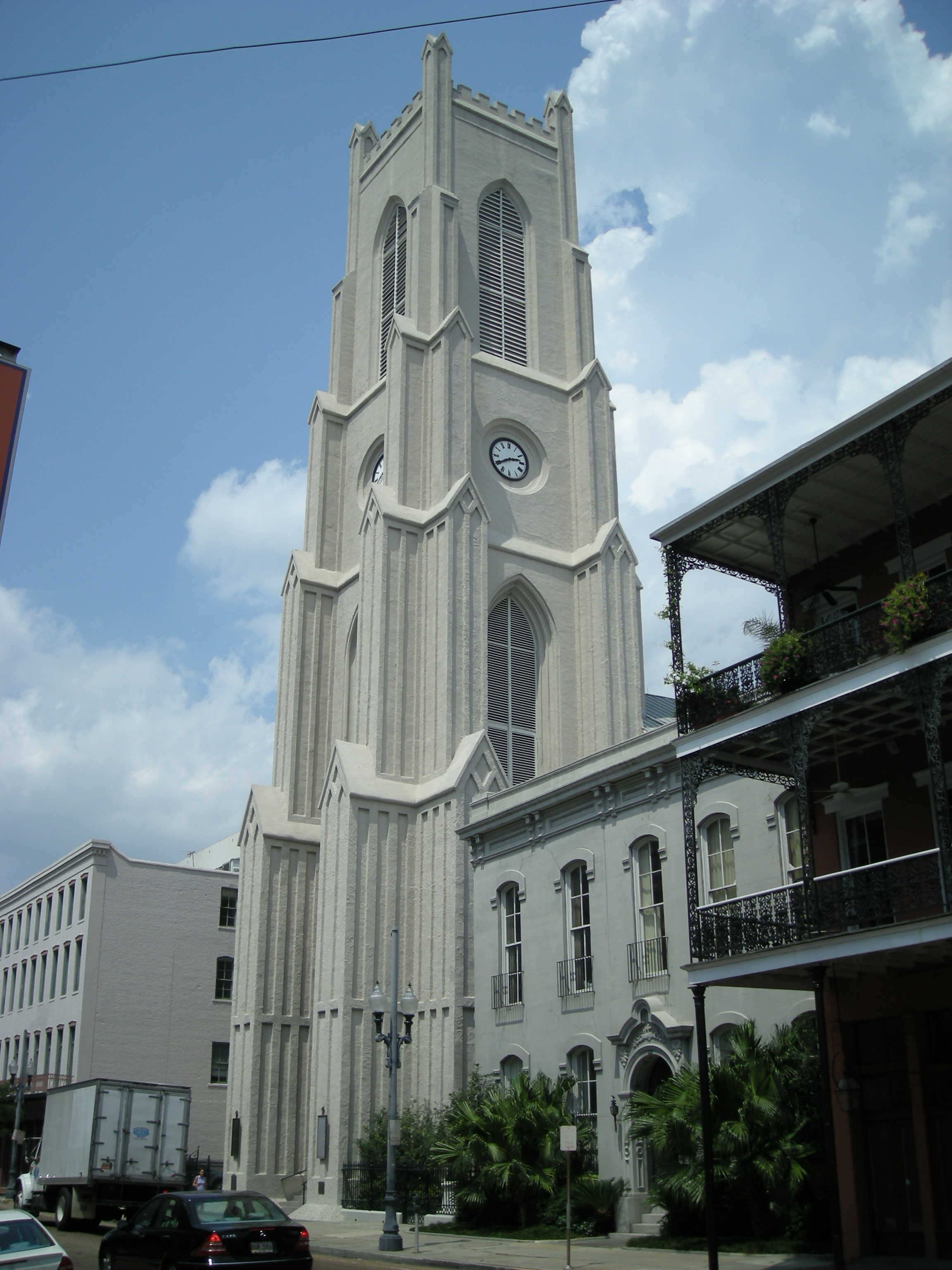
- St. Patrick's Church, 724 Camp Street; parish rectory to the right

- Location within East New Orleans Location within Louisiana Location within the United States
- Location: New Orleans, Louisiana
- Coordinates: 29°56′47.92″N 90°4′11.42″W
- Built: 1837
- Architect: Dakin & Dakin; Gallier, James Sr.
- Architectural style: Gothic Revival
- NRHP reference No.: 74000936

Significant dates
- Added to NRHP: May 30, 1974
- Designated NHL: May 30, 1974

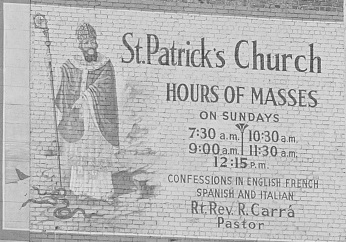
St. Patrick's Church "confessions in English, French, Spanish and Italian" on billboard in 1941 New Orleans

St. Patrick's Church is a Catholic church and parish in the Archdiocese of New Orleans, Louisiana, United States. The parish was founded in 1833, and the current structure was completed in 1840. It is the second-oldest parish in New Orleans (the oldest parish is St. Louis Cathedral), located upriver from the French Quarter at 724 Camp Street in what is now the Central Business District. The building, a National Historic Landmark, is one of the nation's earliest and finest examples of Gothic Revival architecture.

== History ==
The first major development in New Orleans outside of the Vieux Carré was Faubourg St. Mary, begun after 1788; the area is now the core of the Central Business District and Warehouse District. The Faubourg came to be known as the "American Quarter," as differentiated from the French Quarter. Irish immigration in the early nineteenth century brought English-speaking Catholics to the city, many of whom settled in the new commercial district of Faubourg St. Mary. The religious and linguistic demographics of the city were changing; Catholicism in New Orleans had been dominated by the Creoles, descendants of the French, Spanish, and African (both enslaved and free) settlers of the previous century. By the 1830s, a church was needed for those who did not speak French.

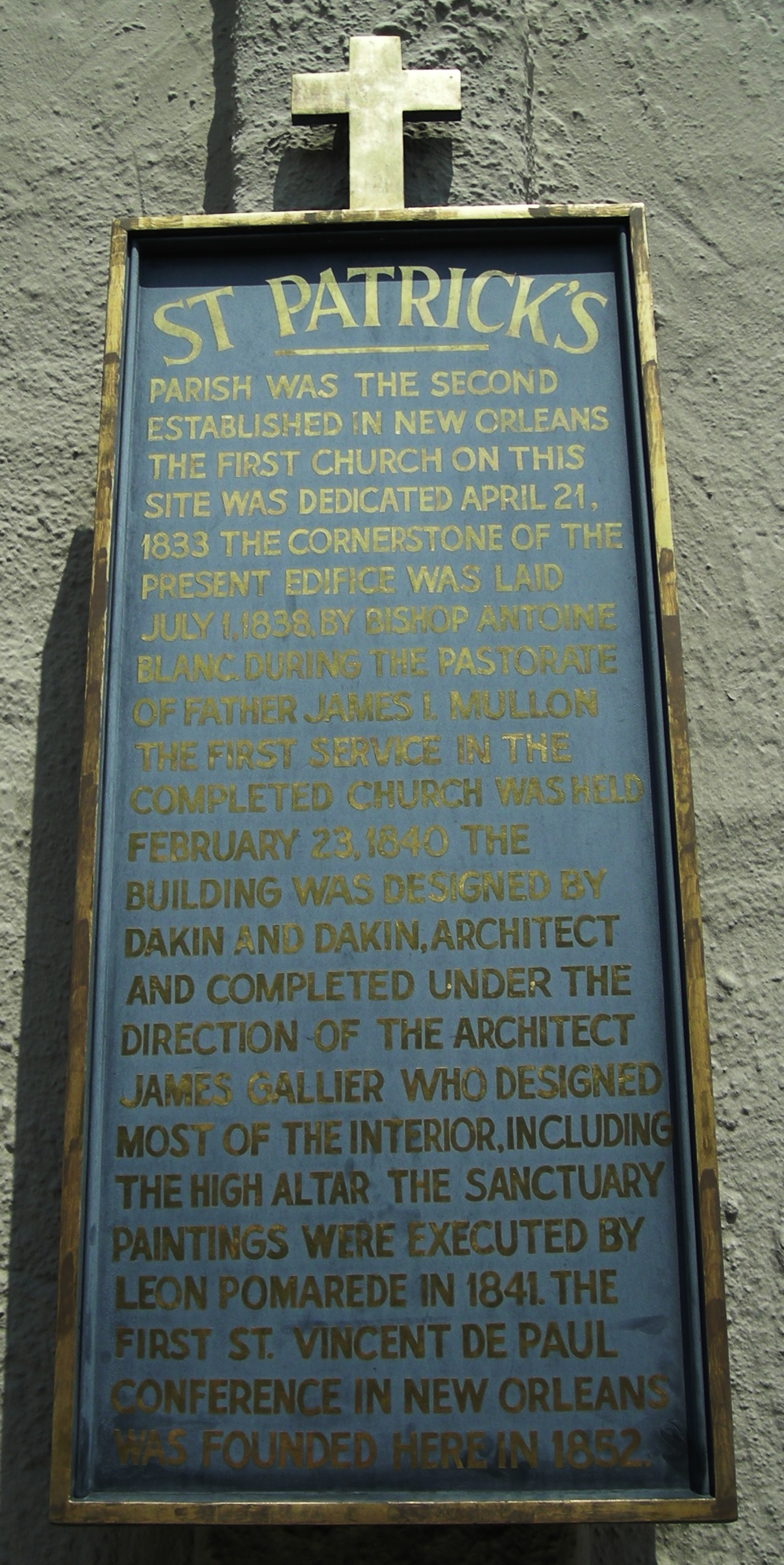
Descriptive marker on the front of the church

In 1833, Bishop Leo-Raymond de Neckere established a new parish in Faubourg St. Mary, St. Patrick's Church. Construction of a permanent church building began later in the decade and was completed in 1840. During the 1849-1851 rebuilding of St. Louis Cathedral, the church was named pro-cathedral of the diocese.

The decades after the church's establishment saw anti-immigrant violence involving the Know Nothing Party. Father James Mullon, whose portrait hangs in the back of the church, was pastor at the time and held significant clout in the city. Many nativists feared that he and the Irish were taking control of New Orleans from the establishment. St. Patrick's remained an anchor of the local Church throughout the events of the tumultuous decades that followed, including the infamous occupation of the city by Union troops under the unpopular Major General Benjamin Butler during the American Civil War. During the war, the outspoken Mullon, who had been pastor by then for decades, was accosted by Butler for refusing to preside at the funeral of a Union soldier. Mullon responded, in a moment of local lore, by apologizing and remarking that he would gladly preside at the funerals of Butler and all the Union troops.

The church building was named a National Historic Landmark in 1975. A major restoration, lasting from 1978 to 1990, preserved the structure so that the parish could continue to serve the people of New Orleans as it had for 150 years.

=== Hurricane Katrina ===
Located on relatively high ground near the river, St. Patrick's was not in the flood zone during and after Hurricane Katrina and did not experience significant physical damage. Its parishioners and regular churchgoers come from throughout the archdiocese and were scattered by the hurricane like everyone else.

In keeping with St. Patrick's history as New Orleans' second oldest parish, it and St. Louis Cathedral held the first masses in New Orleans after Hurricane Katrina on Sunday, October 2, 2005. The New York Times reported the reopening of both churches, quoting one parishioner regarding the ringing of the bell in the tower, "You can call this a homecoming bell for New Orleans. We have good news we want to get out."

=== Bankruptcy ===
In November 2025, the Archdiocese of New Orleans placed over 150 parishes and charities in Chapter 11 bankruptcy protection as part of a settlement plan to resolve hundreds of sex abuse lawsuits. This wave of bankruptcies included this church.

== Architecture ==
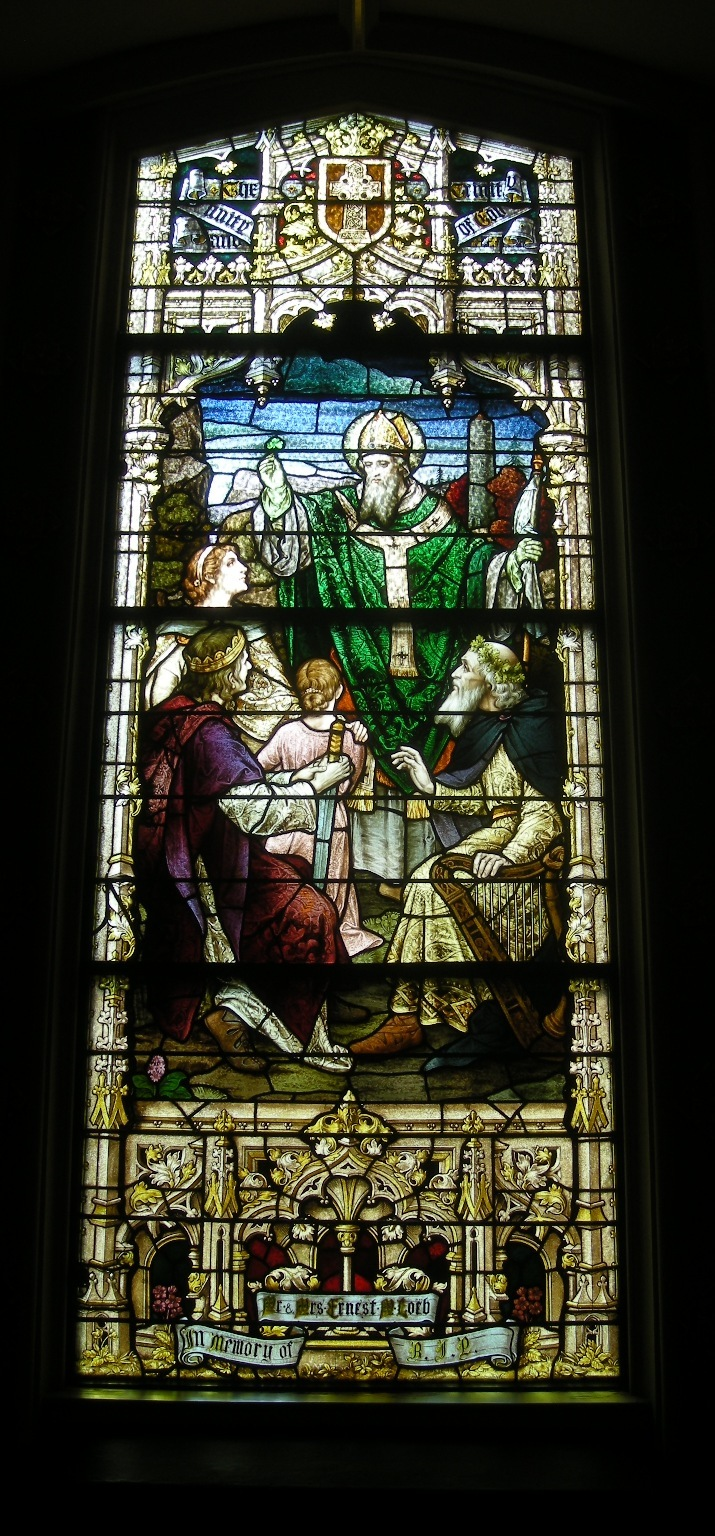
Window on the right side of the church, near the front

St. Patrick's is in the Gothic style, with a fairly simple exterior but a highly ornate interior. Doorways, windows, the organ, and the altar all conform to architectural design. The bell tower is 185 feet (56 m) tall; some nineteenth century aerial views of New Orleans were painted from its roof. The interior of the nave is 85 feet (26 m) tall. Slender columns support the fan vaulting of the ceiling, which is particularly elaborate above the altar, incorporating sixteen stained glass windows in a half-dome. Three large paintings above the altar depict, from left to right: Saint Patrick, the Transfiguration of Jesus, and Jesus Christ pulling Saint Peter from the sea.

The architect of St. Patrick's Church was James H. Dakin, who designed a number of buildings in Louisiana, including the Old State Capitol in Baton Rouge. Problems related to the city's notoriously high water table drew in another prominent local architect, James Gallier, to oversee the construction.

== Location ==
St. Patrick's is located on Camp Street in New Orleans, between Julia and Girod Streets. It is within walking distance of the downtown hotels and French Quarter, less than half a mile from Canal Street.

It is in the middle of what has become an arts district, with a number of small galleries and the Ogden Museum of Southern Art in the surrounding blocks.

== Tradition ==
The parish has made efforts to maintain a sense of traditional reverence amid New Orleans' reputation for revelry. As part of this effort, the parish offers the Tridentine Mass in Ecclesiastical Latin every day, weekdays and Sundays, in accordance with the 1962 Roman Missal.

== See also ==
- List of Catholic cathedrals in the United States
- List of cathedrals in the United States
- List of National Historic Landmarks in Louisiana
- National Register of Historic Places listings in Orleans Parish, Louisiana
