= Lafayette Square (New Orleans) =

Public park in Louisiana, United States

Coordinates: 29.9483°N 90.0703°W

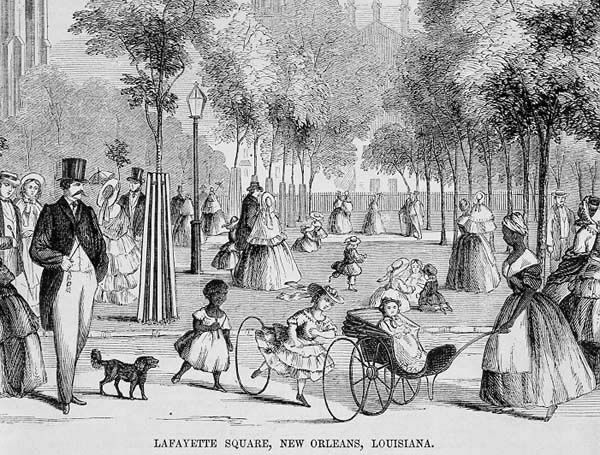
1854

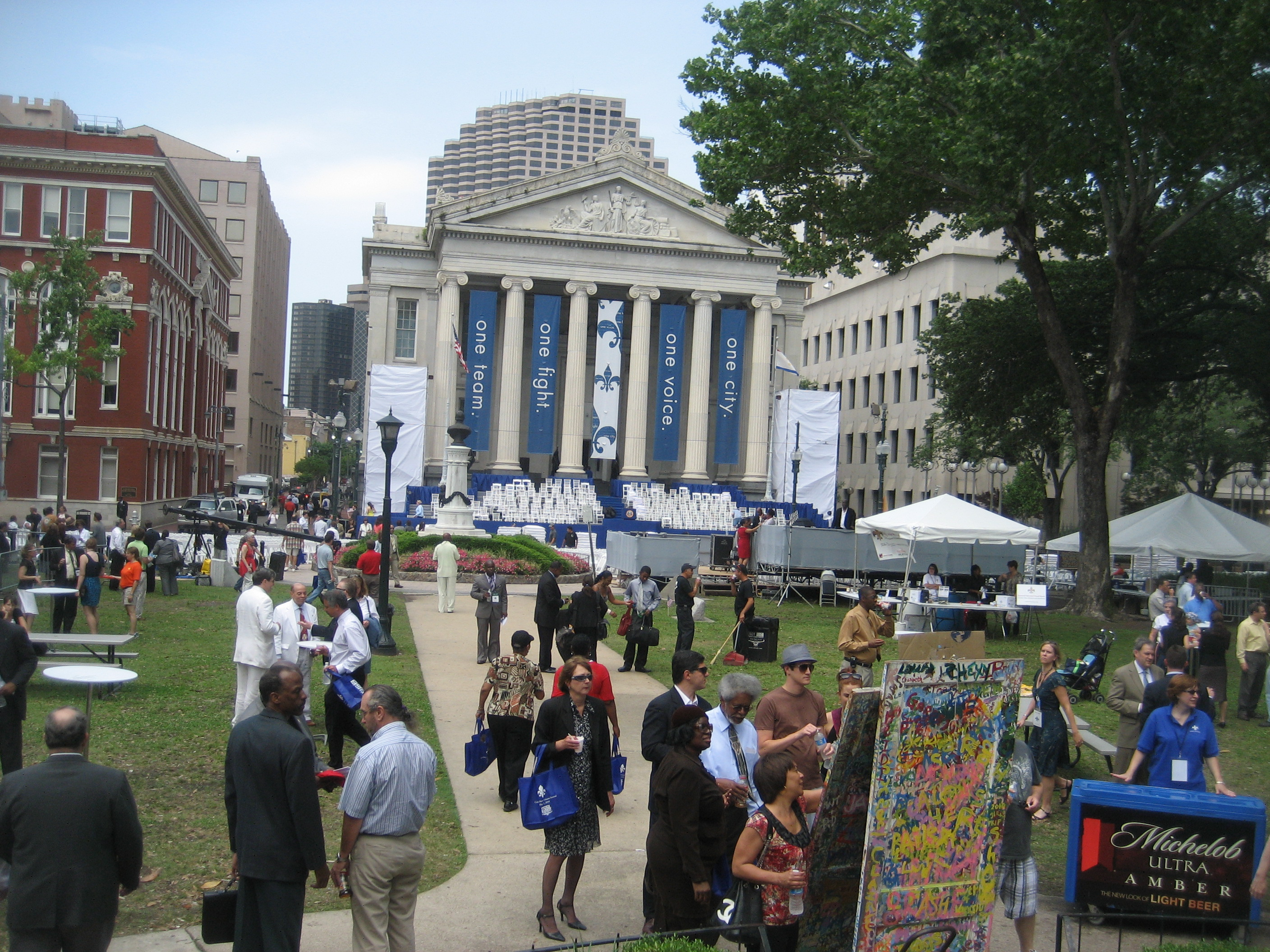
2010

Lafayette Square is the second-oldest public park in New Orleans, Louisiana (after Jackson Square), located in the present-day Central Business District. During the late 18th century, this was part of a residential area called Faubourg Sainte Marie (English: St. Mary Suburb).

The park was designed in 1788 by Charles Laveau Trudeau aka Don Carlos Trudeau (1743–1816), Surveyor General of Louisiana under the Spanish government; who later served as New Orleans' acting mayor in 1812, after Louisiana statehood. The Square was named after Gilbert du Motier, Marquis de Lafayette, a French aristocrat and general who fought on the American side in the American Revolutionary War. The park has a bronze statue of Henry Clay in the center of the park and a statue of Benjamin Franklin on Camp Street. A statue of John McDonogh on St. Charles Avenue was removed in July 2020.

Gallier Hall, the former City Hall of New Orleans faces the square on St. Charles Avenue. Although the city government has moved elsewhere, the square is still used for inaugurations and civic events. The square also often hosts live music.

From 1834 to 1938 First Presbyterian Church of New Orleans occupied much of the Western side of the square and was the tallest steeple in the city. It was from this steeple that General Benjamin Butler used the bell to ring curfew during the occupation of New Orleans (1862–65) during the American Civil War. Most of the architectural elements (including the bell) were moved to First Presbyterian's subsequent location at the corner of South Claiborne and Jefferson Avenues in New Orleans.

Hurricane Katrina severely damaged the trees in the park, with broken glass and debris from nearby buildings making the park unsafe. A group of neighborhood residents and downtown workers formed a charitable organization, the Lafayette Square Conservancy, to transform it into a premier urban space.

== See also ==
- Uptown New Orleans#City of Lafayette
- Faubourg Lafayette
