= Old Bank of Louisville =

- Southern National Bank
- U.S. National Register of Historic Places
- U.S. National Historic Landmark
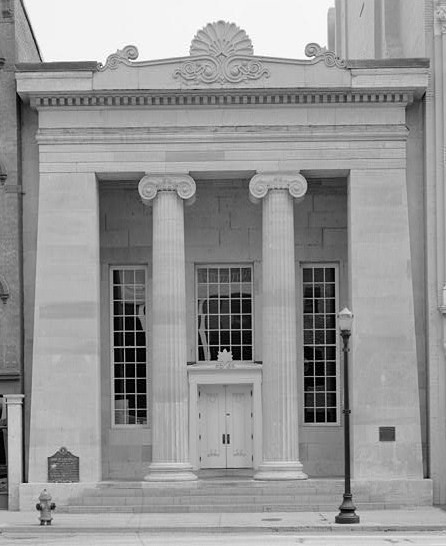
- Old Bank of Louisville Building in 1987

- Location within Kentucky Location within the United States
- Location: 316 W. Main St., Louisville, Kentucky
- Coordinates: 38°15′19.96″N 85°45′20.02″W
- Built: 1837
- Architect: Dakin, James H.
- Architectural style: Greek Revival
- NRHP reference No.: 71000349
- Added to NRHP: August 12, 1971

The Old Bank of Louisville, also known historically as the Southern National Bank building, is a historic commercial building at 316 West Main Street in downtown Louisville, Kentucky. Completed in 1837, it was designated a National Historic Landmark in 1971 for its exceptionally fine Greek Revival architecture. It currently serves as the lobby for the adjacent Actors Theatre of Louisville.

== Description and history ==
The Old Bank of Louisville is located in downtown Louisville, on the south side of West Main Street between 3rd and 4th Streets. Occupying a relatively narrow lot, its facade consists of a pair of fluted stone columns topped by Ionic capitals and set in antis beneath an entablature and iron crested parapet. The flanking antae are, like the columns, fashioned from limestone, but with a battered finish. Behind the columns is a three-bay facade, with tall multipane windows flanking and rising above the center entrance. The interior retains some original finishes, notably including Ionic columns and a domed ceiling.

The building was probably completed in 1837, for the Bank of Louisville, which had been chartered in 1832. It was probably designed by James Dakin, an architect who had worked with Minard Lafever, including the preparation of drawings for Lafever's The Beauties of Modern Architecture, published in 1835. Several of the building's features appear to be derived from plates found in that book. Gideon Shryock, who was long thought to be its designer, apparently served as its construction superintendent.

After serving for many years as a bank, the building was converted in the 1970s to serve as a lobby space for the adjacent theater.
