= Barton Academy =

- U.S. National Register of Historic Places
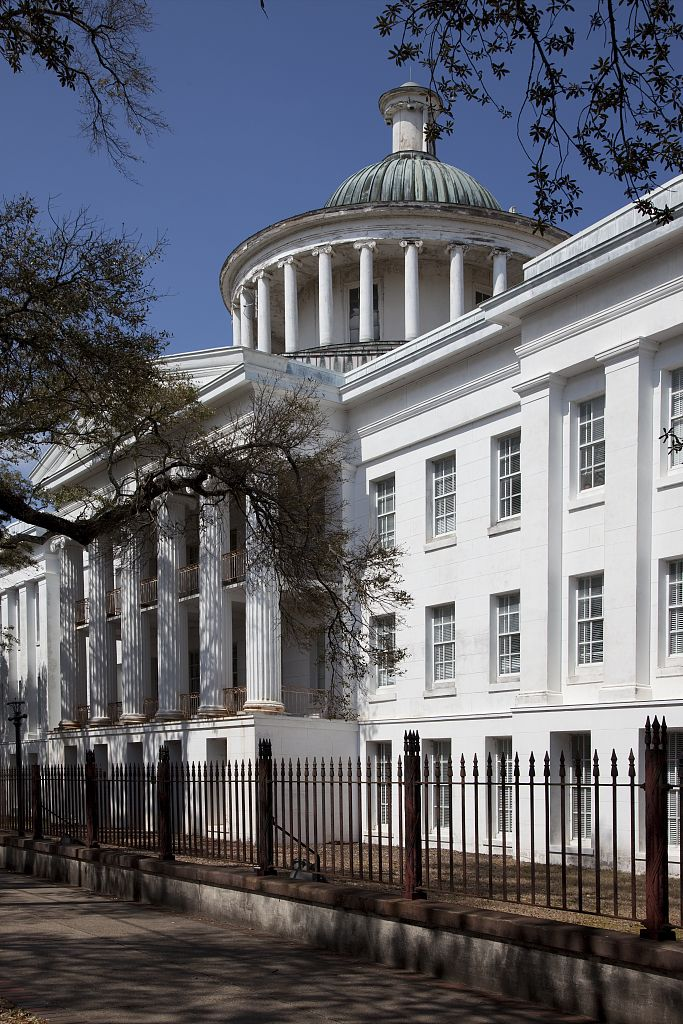
- Front (south) elevation in 2010.

- Location within Mobile, Alabama Location within Alabama Location within the United States
- Location: 504 Government Street; Mobile, Alabama
- Coordinates: 30°41′18.67″N 88°2′52.08″W
- Area: 1.8 acres (0.73 ha)
- Built: 1836
- Architect: James Gallier, James H. Dakin and Charles B. Dakin
- Architectural style: Greek Revival
- NRHP reference No.: 70000107
- Added to NRHP: February 16, 1970

Barton Academy is a historic Greek Revival school building located on Government Street in Mobile, Alabama, United States. It was under construction from 1836 to 1839 and was designed by architects James H. Dakin, Charles B. Dakin, and James Gallier, Sr. Gallier and the Dakin brothers also designed the nearby Government Street Presbyterian Church. Barton Academy was the first public school in the state of Alabama.

== History ==
Barton Academy was named for Willoughby Barton, an Alabama state legislator from Mobile who introduced an act that created the Board of School Commissioners of Mobile County on January 10, 1826. This was the first education board in Alabama. The board bought all of the property in the block between Government, Cedar, Conti, and Lawrence Streets for $2750 in 1830.

Lack of funding stalled progress on the project until an act was passed in the state legislature that allowed the commissioners to raise funds through a lottery. By early 1836 the building committee had managed to pull together $50,000 in lottery funds, a $15,000 municipal loan, and additional private donations. This included a large private donation from local millionaire Henry Hitchcock, who was also on the building committee. Construction commenced on February 13, 1836, the same day as Government Street Presbyterian, with Charles Dakin as the supervising architect. Thomas James was hired as the mason, just as he was on the Government Street Presbyterian project.

The Barton building project proved to be more complex than the one on Government Street Presbyterian, with Dakin forced to spend much more of his time supervising the construction. Progress on the building was slow. Then, on March 9, 1837, the building committee determined that work done on the roof was incomplete or faulty, resulting in water damage to the interior plaster. The building was at least habitable by the summer of that year, however, and the building committee began holding their meetings upstairs. Interior paint was applied in September 1837, but the last of the finish work was not completed until January 1839.

Following completion, the Board of School Commissioners of Mobile County then allowed the building to be used for private and denominational schools, with some funding appropriated to them by the commissioners. An act in 1846 allowed for taxes to be collected for the establishment of a free Methodist school by the commission. The commission was behind another act on February 9, 1852, that would have allowed the commission to sell the building, which was now in need of maintenance and repairs, and distribute the proceeds among the existing schools, if approved by the voters. The electorate rejected this and subsequently elected a new board of commissioners.

After the election of the new board, the building was repaired and the system was reorganized. The building reopened as a public school in November 1852. The school was closed for the duration of the American Civil War. The Girls High School reopened in 1865, followed by the Boys High School in 1870. Both would continue at Barton until the opening of Murphy High School in 1926. The building was surveyed by the Historic American Buildings Survey several times from 1934 to 1937. It continued to serve as a school building until the 1960s when it was converted into the Central Office for the Mobile County Public School System. Barton was added to the National Register of Historic Places on February 16, 1970. In 2007 the headquarters moved out of Barton Academy.

== Design ==
Barton Academy is three floors in height and is primarily constructed of brick which has been stuccoed and scored to look like ashlar. A heavy ground floor supports the main floor and the slightly smaller third floor. The building can be visually divided into a central block with a two-story, pedimented, hexastyle Ionic portico, five bays wide, with wrought-iron balustrades. A low-pitched hipped roof over this block is topped by a domed cupola that is ringed by 28 Ionic columns. The dome is surmounted by a lantern, patterned after the Choragic Monument of Lysicrates. To either side of the central block is a plain section, three bays wide. Adjoining these plain sections are east and west blocks, also three bays wide, with each bay defined by projecting pilasters.

Barton has had many unsympathetic additions over the years since construction, resulting in an interior that currently bears little resemblance to the original plan. That plan consisted of a central stair hall with flanking classrooms on all three levels. The original wooden windows have been replaced by metal ones. Only the interior of the rotunda under the dome remains in its original condition and configuration.

== Restoration efforts ==
The Alabama Historical Commission and the Alabama Trust for Historic Preservation named Barton Academy as one of their "Places in Peril" in 2005, citing the school board's planned relocation of its administrative center and the general neglect that the structure had already suffered. Places in Peril is a list of threatened historic sites in Alabama. The school board relocated its central office in 2007 and was initially working with preservation agencies in an effort to have the building restored.

The restoration effort stalled on January 28, 2009, when the school board delayed a decision on setting aside an additional $700,000 for the renovation of Barton. The board had already dedicated $2.3 million to the restoration effort, but two board members stated opposition to spending any of the money on the structure, citing needs elsewhere in the school system. Barton was re-listed in 2009 on Alabama's "Places in Peril." With $14 million in funding raised, restoration of the building began in June 2020. Barton Academy was officially reopened in August 2021.

== Alumni ==
- Henry Vernon Atherton (1923–2016), professor of Animal Science at the University of Vermont and a pioneer in the American dairy industry
- Carleton B. Gibson (1863–1927), industrial educator and university president
- Alfred G. Ward (1908–1982), admiral in the United States Navy
