= Gallier Hall =

- U.S. National Register of Historic Places
- U.S. National Historic Landmark
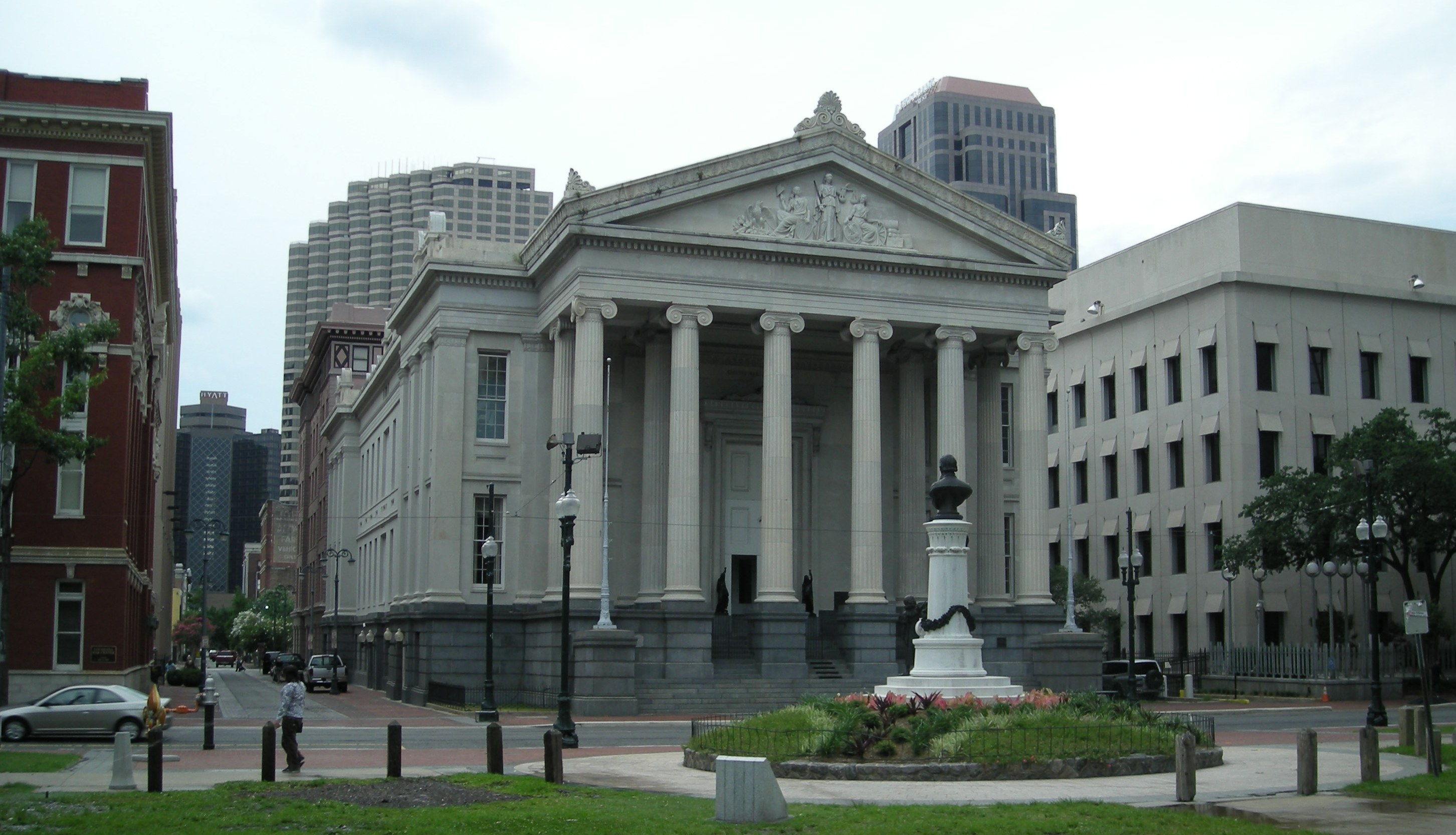
- Gallier Hall, facing Lafayette Square, New Orleans

- Location within East New Orleans Location within Louisiana Location within the United States
- Location: 545 St. Charles Avenue, New Orleans, Louisiana, U. S.
- Coordinates: 29°56′46.76″N 90°4′17.01″W
- Built: 1853
- Architect: James Gallier Sr.
- Architectural style: Greek Revival
- NRHP reference No.: 74002250

Significant dates
- Added to NRHP: May 30, 1974
- Designated NHL: May 30, 1974

Gallier Hall is a historic building on St. Charles Avenue in New Orleans, Louisiana. It is the former New Orleans city hall, and continues in civic use. Built 1845–1853, it is a nationally significant example of Greek Revival architecture, and one of the finest works of architect James Gallier. It was designated a National Historic Landmark in 1974.

== Description and history ==
Gallier Hall is located on St. Charles Avenue at Lafayette Square in the Central Business District. The building was originally designed to be the city hall of New Orleans by the architect, James Gallier Sr. Construction began in 1845, and the building was dedicated on 10 May 1853. Gallier Hall is a three-story marble structure fronted by two rows of fluted Ionic columns in the Neoclassical style. It is one of the most important structures built during the antebellum period of the city.

After its dedication in 1853, Gallier Hall remained the city hall for just over a century. Many important events during the Civil War, Reconstruction, and the era of Louisiana governor Huey Long took place at Gallier Hall.

After the City Hall was moved to the modern complex at Duncan Plaza in the 1950s, old Gallier Hall nonetheless continued its traditional place of honor during Mardi Gras. Viewing galleries in front of the hall are reserved for Mardi Gras royalty, and parades on the St. Charles route pause in front of them. Marching bands typically perform shows here during the parades. On Mardi Gras Day the mayor of New Orleans toasts the kings of the Zulu Social Aid & Pleasure Club and Rex Parade here.

Gallier Hall is currently a convention center, reception hall, and home of the Ty Tracy Theatre, named for the late artistic director of the New Orleans Recreation Department (NORD) Theatre. The Ty Tracy Theatre is home to Julie Condy's Crescent City Lights Youth Theatre organization.

The building also serves as the venue for special civic functions such as mayoral inaugurations. The remains of particularly distinguished citizens sometimes lie in state here following their death, as a sign of deep citywide respect.

== See also ==
- Lafayette Square
- List of National Historic Landmarks in Louisiana
- National Register of Historic Places listings in Orleans Parish, Louisiana
