= New Orleans Central Business District =

Neighborhood of New Orleans, United States

Central Business District
- Neighborhood
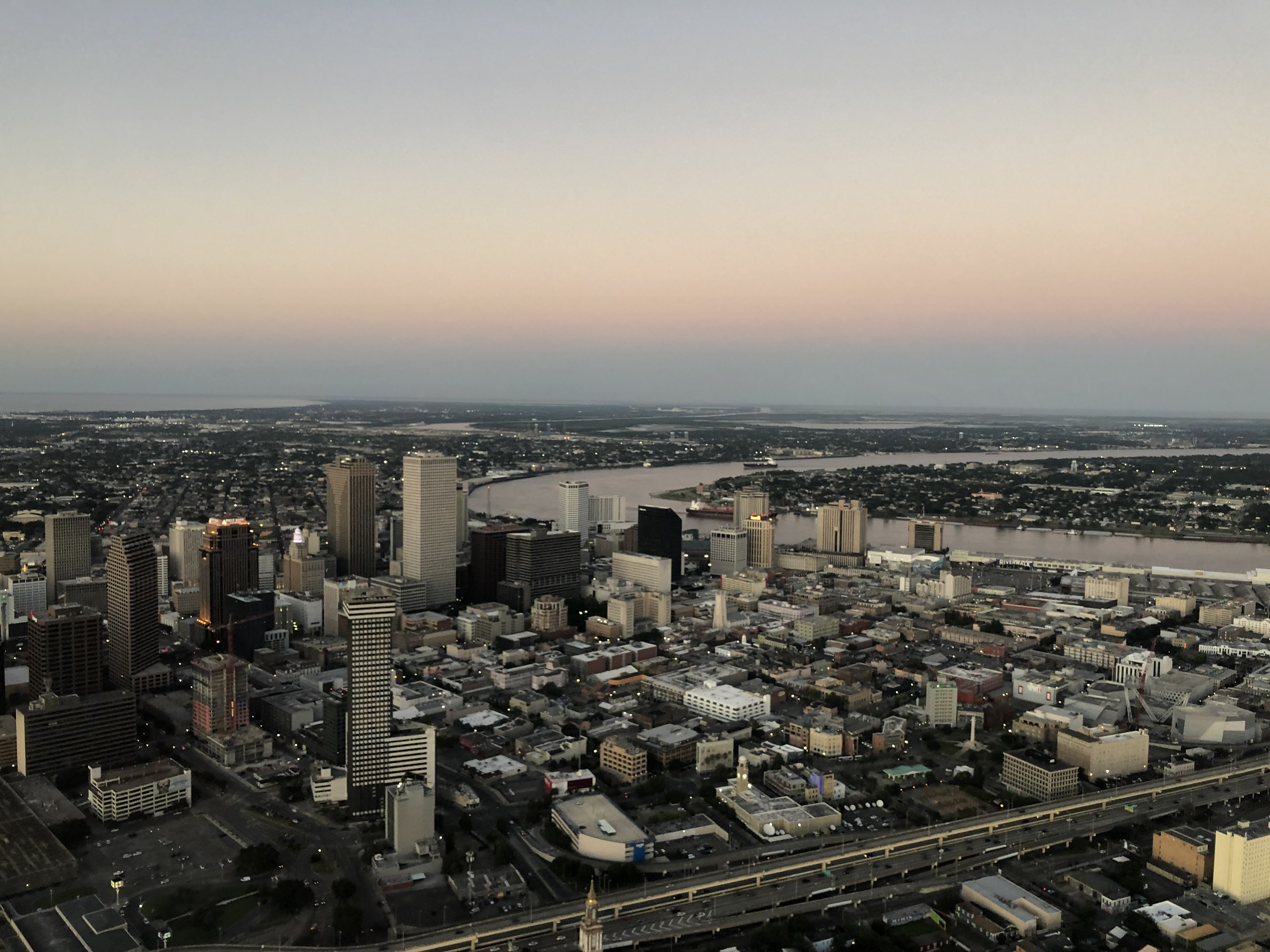
- New Orleans' Central Business District in 2019
- Interactive map of Central Business District
- Coordinates: 29°56′59″N 90°04′14″W
- Country: United States
- State: Louisiana
- City: New Orleans
- Planning district: District 1, French Quarter/CBD

Area
  - Total: 1.18 sq mi (3.1 km^{2})
  - Land: 1.06 sq mi (2.7 km^{2})
  - Water: 0.12 sq mi (0.31 km^{2})
- Elevation: 3 ft (0.91 m)

Population (2010)
  - Total: 2,060
  - Density: 1,940/sq mi (750/km^{2})
- Time zone: UTC-6 (CST)
  - Summer (DST): UTC-5 (CDT)
- Area code: 504

The Central Business District (CBD) is a neighborhood of the city of New Orleans, Louisiana, United States.

The CBD is a subdistrict of the French Quarter/CBD area. Its boundaries, as defined by the City Planning Commission are Iberville, Decatur and Canal Streets to the north; the Mississippi River to the east; the New Orleans Morial Convention Center, Julia and Magazine Streets, and the Pontchartrain Expressway to the south; and South Claiborne Avenue, Cleveland Street, as well as South and North Derbigny Streets to the west. It is the equivalent of what many cities call their downtown, although in New Orleans "downtown" or "down town" historically used to mean all portions of the city downriver from Canal Street (in the direction or flow of the Mississippi River). In recent decades, however, use of the catch-all "downtown" adjective to describe neighborhoods downriver from Canal Street has largely ceased, having been replaced in usage by individual neighborhood names (like Bywater).

Originally developed as the largely-residential Faubourg Ste. Marie (English: St. Mary Suburb) in the late 18th century, the modern Central Business District is today a dynamic, mixed-use neighborhood, the home of professional offices in skyscrapers, specialty and neighborhood retail stores, numerous restaurants and clubs, and thousands of residents inhabiting restored, historic commercial and industrial buildings.

A part of the area is listed on the National Register of Historic Places as the New Orleans Lower Central Business District.

== History ==
Streets in the Central Business District (originally Faubourg Ste. Marie) were initially platted in the late 18th century, representing the first expansion of New Orleans beyond its original French Quarter footprint. Significant investment began in earnest after the Louisiana Purchase of 1803, as people from other parts of the United States flocked to the city. Consequently, the district began to be referred to as the American Sector.

While traditionally Canal Street was viewed as the dividing line between the French Quarter and the American Sector, legally both sides of Canal Street are today considered part of the Central Business District for zoning and regulatory purposes. Through the 19th and into the 20th century, the Central Business District continued developing almost without pause. By the mid-20th century most professional offices in the region were located downtown, the hub of a well-developed public transit system. Canal Street was the primary retail destination for New Orleanians, as well as for residents of the surrounding region. Local and regional department stores Maison Blanche, D.H. Holmes, Godchaux's, Gus Mayer, Labiche's, Kreeger's, and Krauss anchored numerous well-known specialty retailers including Rubenstein Bros., Adler's Jewelry, Koslow's, Rapp's, and Werlein's Music. National retailers like Kress, Woolworth, and Walgreens were present alongside local drugstore K&B. Sears operated a large store one block off Canal, on Baronne Street. Bookstores, theaters, and movie palaces abounded with the neon marquees of the Saenger, Loews State, RKO Orpheum, Joy, and Civic theaters nightly casting multi-colored lights onto surrounding sidewalks.

In the 1950s, six-lane Loyola Avenue was constructed as an extension of Elk Place, cutting a swath through a low-income residential district and initially hosting the city's new civic center complex. The late-1960s widening of Poydras Street was undertaken to create another six-lane central area circulator for vehicular traffic, as well as to accommodate modern high-rise construction. The City of New Orleans partook in transforming the district from 1973 to 1993, in a collaboration between public and private sectors to spark active community participation. The portion of the CBD closer to the Mississippi River and upriver from Poydras Street is known as the Warehouse District, because it was heavily devoted to warehousing and manufacturing before shipping became containerized. The 1984 World's Fair drew attention to the then semi-derelict district, resulting in steady investment and redevelopment from the mid-1980s onward. Many of the old 19th-century warehouses have been converted into hotels, restaurants, condominiums, and art galleries. For further information, read about Loft 523, a boutique hotel.

Notable structures in the CBD include the Greek Revival Gallier Hall (the city's former city hall); Caesars Superdome; the Smoothie King Center; the city's present-day, International style city hall; and Hancock Whitney Center, the city's tallest building and headquarters for Royal Dutch Shell's Gulf of Mexico Exploration and Production. Other significant attractions are the postmodern Piazza d'Italia, Harrah's Casino now Caesar's New Orleans, the Four Seasons Hotel which was the World Trade Center of New Orleans, the U.S. Fifth Circuit Court of Appeals, St. Patrick's Church, the Hibernia Bank Building, and the former New Orleans Cotton Exchange.

The principal public park in the CBD is Lafayette Square which faces both Gallier Hall and the Fifth Circuit Court of Appeals. There are other public spaces like Duncan Plaza, Elk Place, the Piazza d'Italia, Tivoli Circle, Mississippi River Heritage Park, Spanish Plaza, and the Richard and Annette Bloch Cancer Survivors Plaza. Museums include The National World War II Museum, the Ogden Museum of Southern Art, the Louisiana Children's Museum, the New Orleans Contemporary Arts Center, and the Confederate Memorial Hall Museum.

New Orleans CBD was one of the few areas of New Orleans which escaped the catastrophic flooding of 2005's Hurricane Katrina.

== Geography ==
The Central Business District is located at 29°56′59″N 90°04′14″W and has an elevation of 3 feet (0.9 m). As is true of most of metropolitan New Orleans, the parts of the district nearer the river are higher in elevation than areas further removed from it. According to the United States Census Bureau, the district has a total area of 1.18 square miles (3.1 km^{2}). 1.06 square miles (2.7 km^{2}) of which is land and 0.12 square miles (0.3 km^{2}) (10.17%) of which is water.

=== Adjacent neighborhoods ===
- Iberville Development (north)
- French Quarter (north)
- Lower Garden District (south)
- Central City (south)
- Tulane/Gravier (west)

=== Boundaries ===
The City Planning Commission defines the boundaries of the Central Business District as these streets: Iberville Street, Decatur Street, Canal Street, the Mississippi River, the New Orleans Morial Convention Center, Julia Street, Magazine Street, the Pontchartrain Expressway, South Claiborne Avenue, Cleveland Avenue, and also South Derbigny Street and North Derbigny Street.

== Demographics ==
As of the census of 2000, there were 3,435 inhabitants of the census tracts best corresponding to the boundaries of the New Orleans Downtown Development District. The population density was 1,692 /mi^{2} (664 /km^{2}). Another 4,142 inhabitants of the adjacent French Quarter neighborhood were recorded in the 2000 Census. The CBD, its subdistricts (e.g., the Warehouse District), and the bordering neighborhoods of Tremé, the French Quarter, and the Lower Garden District had 21,630 residents, according to the 2000 Census.

== Government and infrastructure ==
The New Orleans City Hall and surrounding structures, including the circa-1960, architecturally award-winning Main Branch of the New Orleans Public Library face Duncan Plaza, an exercise in 1950s-style urban renewal embodying then-mayor Chep Morrison's desire to create a modern civic center. The New Orleans Civic Center is today much diminished due to the Louisiana Supreme Court building being torn down in the wake of the court's 2004 departure for the French Quarter, the Louisiana State office building having suffered the same fate, and Duncan Plaza itself having been fenced off.

The United States Postal Service operates the New Orleans Main Post Office at 701 Loyola Avenue in the CBD. The Union Passenger Terminal is the terminus for three of Amtrak's long-distance trains, the City of New Orleans train, the Crescent train, and since 2005 the Sunset Limited (with the elimination, due to Katrina damage, of the eastbound portion of the Sunset Limited route), and also offers inter-city bus service via Greyhound Lines.

Interstate Highway access is provided by I-10, via the Claiborne and Pontchartrain Expressways. When I-10 curves to the east by the Louisiana Superdome and becomes the Claiborne Expressway, elevated above N. Claiborne Avenue, the Pontchartrain Expressway continues as U.S. Route 90 Business and crosses the Mississippi River on the twin-bridge Crescent City Connection.

Significant thoroughfares in the CBD include St. Charles Avenue, Camp Street, Carondelet Street, Gravier Street, Poydras Street, Tchoupitoulas Street, Howard Avenue, and Canal Street. Prior to the 1980s, the intersection of Gravier and Carondelet streets was the de facto heart of the city's financial district. Though still a vibrant area, that part of the CBD witnessed the migration of much business slightly upriver to Poydras Street, as many modern high-rise office towers were constructed there in the 1970s and 1980s. The widening of Loyola Avenue, Poydras Street and O'Keefe Avenue aimed to simultaneously create an effective downtown circulator high capacity road network for automobile traffic and make room for large-scale redevelopment (e.g., Duncan Plaza, Caesar's Superdome). However, many of the development sites created in the wake of the improvements were never built upon, leaving a noticeable and unfortunate quantity of surface parking lots along those widened streets.

== Economy ==
Entergy, the region's sole Fortune 500 firm, maintains its headquarters in the CBD, as does Reily Foods Company which markets Luzianne products and Standard Coffee. Other companies headquartered downtown are Freeport-McMoRan, Pan American Life Insurance, Superior Energy Services, TurboSquid, iSeatz, Historic Restoration Inc. (HRI Properties), Tidewater Marine, Energy Partners Ltd., Intermarine, IMTT (International-Matex Tank Terminals), International Coffee Corp., and The Receivables Exchange.

The CBD hosts the New Orleans I.P. (Intellectual Property), home to many creative industries firms, and a substantial number of bioscience companies are established at the New Orleans BioInnovation Center inside of BioDistrict New Orleans. The regional economic alliance Greater New Orleans, Inc. (GNO Inc.), the New Orleans metropolitan area's lead economic development entity for the ten-parish New Orleans region, is also headquartered downtown as is the New Orleans Business Alliance (NOLA BA), the public-private partnership agency leading economic development efforts for the city proper. The World Trade Center of New Orleans (WTCNO) began operating in 1943 and at one time was at 2 Canal Street. That location is now the Four Seasons Hotel and the WTCNO is at One Canal Place.

== Diplomatic missions ==
The Consulate of Mexico in New Orleans is in the CBD. The consulate re-opened in 2008 because of a dramatic increase in the local Mexican immigrant population, many of whom arrived in the wake of Hurricane Katrina to assist in rebuilding the city.

In addition to Mexico, France maintains a consulate in downtown New Orleans, a reflection of the long-standing ties between that country and Louisiana in addition to France's role as the founder of New Orleans in 1718. At one time the Consulate-General of Japan, New Orleans was located in the Entergy Tower. In 2006 Japan announced that it was moving the consulate to Nashville. The Japanese Government moved it to be closer to industries and operations owned by Japanese companies.

Honorary consuls for numerous other nations are in the CBD.

== See also ==
- Downtown New Orleans
  - New Orleans Downtown Development District
- New Orleans Lower Central Business District
- Girod Street Cemetery (1822–1957)
- Hibernia Bank Building
- Lafayette Square, park designed in the late 18th century
  - Gallier Hall, formerly City Hall
- New Orleans Cotton Exchange
- Immaculate Conception Church
- St. Patrick's Church
- Buildings and architecture of New Orleans
- List of streets of New Orleans
  - Canal Street, New Orleans
- List of tallest buildings in New Orleans
- Neighborhoods in New Orleans
- Streetcars in New Orleans
