= Garden District, New Orleans =

Garden District
- New Orleans neighborhood
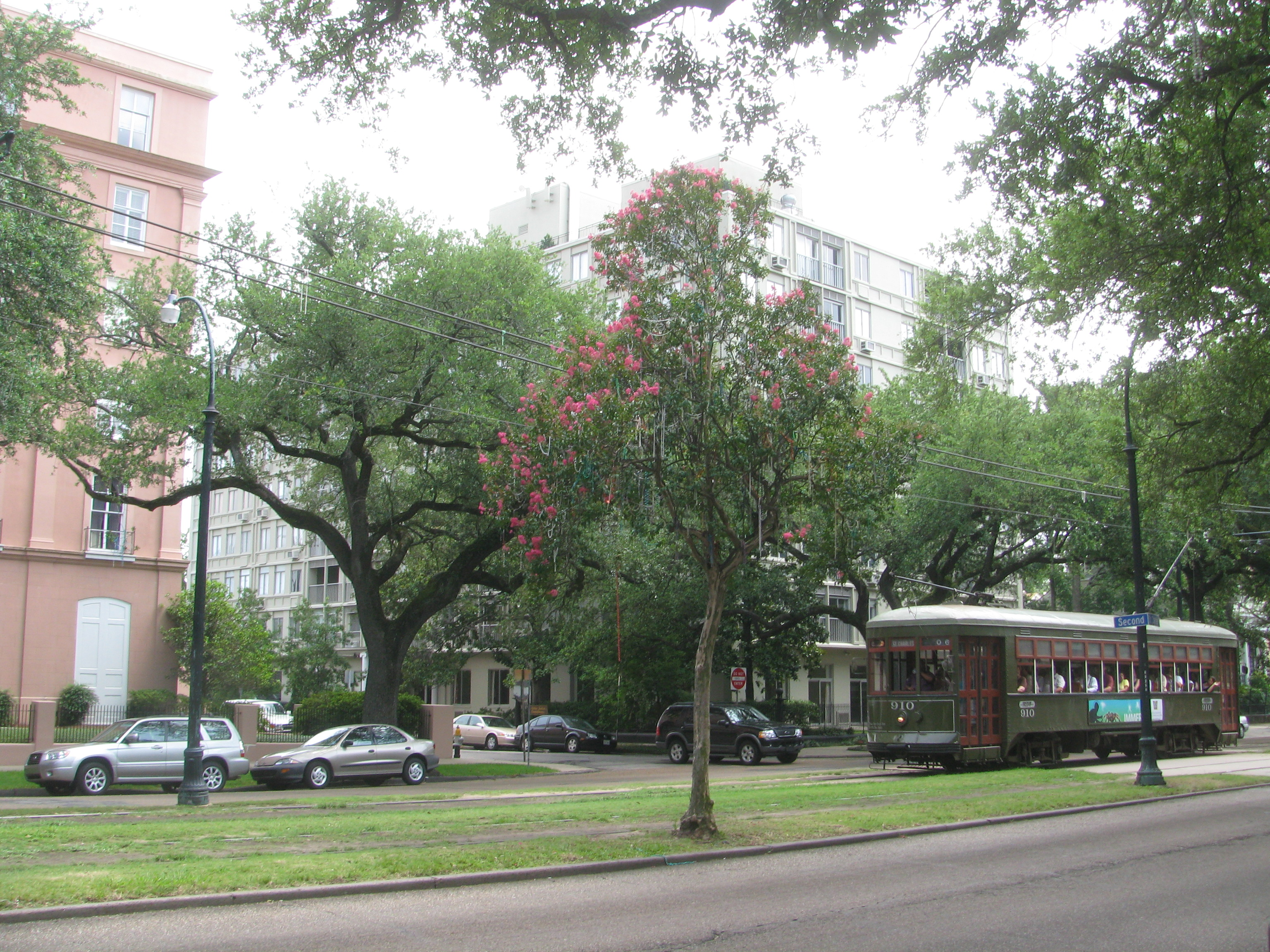
- Streetcar on St. Charles Avenue in the Garden District with Mardi Gras beads on a tree in the foreground
- Interactive map of Garden District
- Coordinates: 29°55′40″N 90°05′05″W
- Country: United States
- State: Louisiana
- City: New Orleans
- Planning District: District 2, Central City/Garden District

Area
  - Total: 0.21 sq mi (0.54 km^{2})
  - Land: 0.21 sq mi (0.54 km^{2})
  - Water: 0.00 sq mi (0 km^{2})
- Elevation: 3 ft (0.91 m)

Population (2010)
  - Total: 1,179
  - Density: 5,600/sq mi (2,200/km^{2})
- Time zone: UTC-6 (CST)
  - Summer (DST): UTC-5 (CDT)
- Area code: 504

The Garden District is a neighborhood of the city of New Orleans, Louisiana, United States. A subdistrict of the Central City/Garden District Area, its boundaries as defined by the New Orleans City Planning Commission are: St. Charles Avenue to the north, 1st Street to the east, Magazine Street to the south, and Toledano Street to the west. The National Historic Landmark district extends a little farther.

The area was originally developed between 1832 and 1900 and is considered one of the best-preserved collections of historic mansions in the Southern United States. The 19th-century origins of the Garden District illustrate wealthy newcomers building opulent structures based upon the prosperity of New Orleans in that era.

== History ==
- Garden District
- U.S. National Register of Historic Places
- U.S. National Historic Landmark District
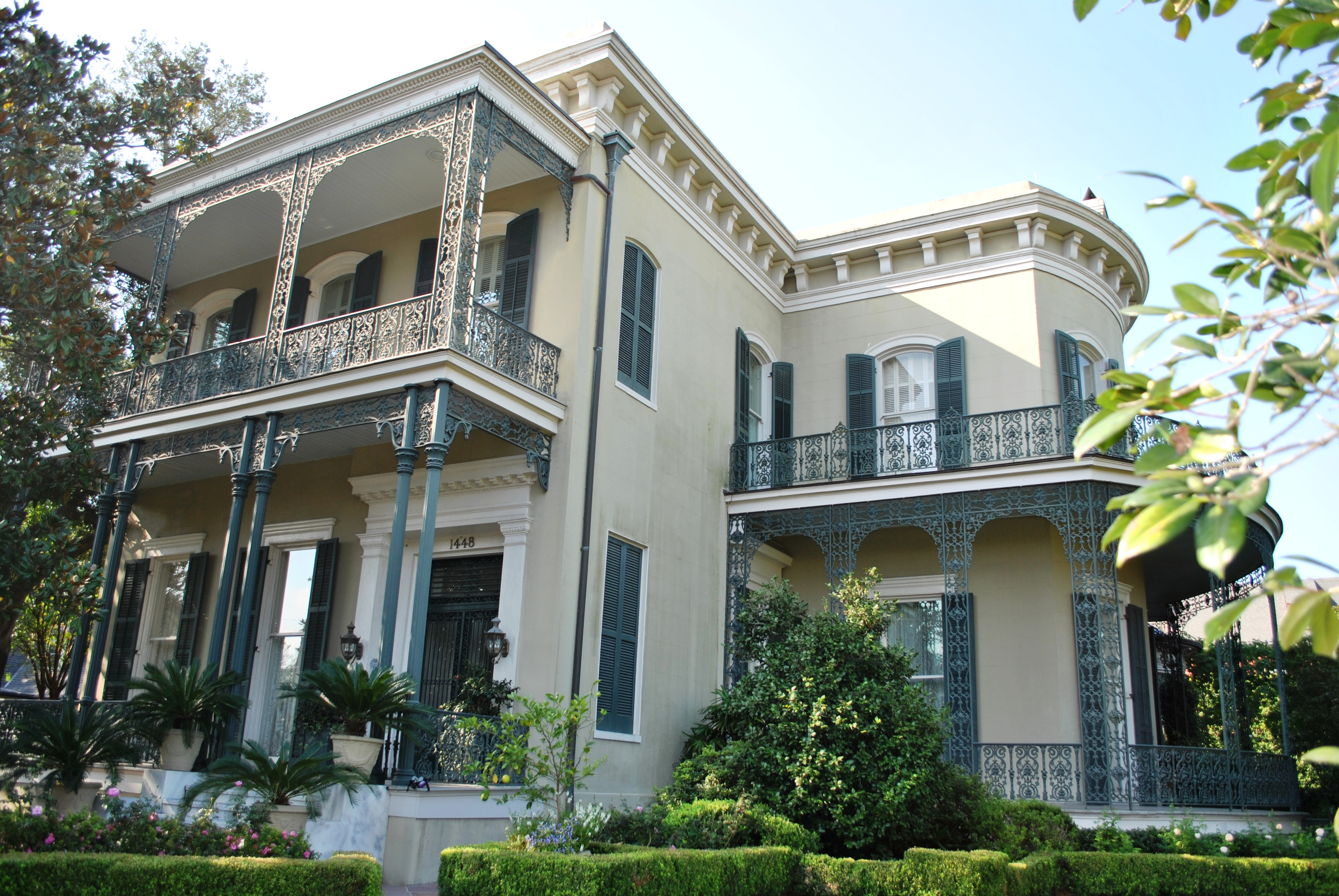
- Colonel Short's Villa

- Location within Louisiana Location within the United States
- Location: Bounded by Carondelet, Josephine, and Magazine Sts., and Louisiana Ave., New Orleans, Louisiana
- Built: 1835
- Architect: Multiple
- Architectural style: Mid 19th Century Revival, Late Victorian
- NRHP reference No.: 71000358

Significant dates
- Added to NRHP: June 21, 1971
- Designated NHLD: May 30, 1974

This whole area was once a number of plantations, including the Livaudais Plantation. It was sold off in parcels to mainly wealthy Americans who did not want to live in the French Quarter with the Creoles. It became a part of the city of Lafayette in 1833, and was annexed by New Orleans in 1852. The district was laid out by New Orleans architect, planner, and surveyor Barthelemy Lafon.

Originally the area was developed with only a couple of houses per block, each surrounded by a large garden, giving the district its name. In the late 19th century, some of these large lots were subdivided, as uptown New Orleans became more urban. This has produced a pattern for much of the neighborhood: of any given block having a couple of early 19th-century mansions surrounded by "gingerbread"-decorated late Victorian period houses. Thus, the "Garden District" is now known for its architecture more than for its gardens per se.

A slightly larger district (one block further west to Louisiana, one block farther north to Carondelet, and three blocks farther east to Josephine) was declared a National Historic Landmark in 1974.

== Geography ==
The Garden District is located at 29°55′40″N 90°05′05″W and has an elevation of 3 feet (0.9 m). According to the United States Census Bureau, the district has a total area of 0.21 square miles (0.5 km^{2}), all of which is land.

=== Adjacent neighborhoods ===
- Central City (north)
- Lower Garden District (east)
- Irish Channel (south)
- Touro (west)

=== Boundaries ===
The Garden District Association defines the boundaries as both sides of Carondelet Street, Josephine Street, both sides of Louisiana Avenue, and Magazine Street.

== Demographics ==
As of the census of 2000, there were 1,970 people, 1,117 households, and 446 families residing in the neighborhood. The population density was 9,381 /mi^{2} (3,940 /km^{2}).

As of the census of 2010, there were 1,926 people, 1,063 households, and 440 families residing in the neighborhood.

== Landmarks ==
- Gilmour–Parker House, 1520 Prytania Street, erected in 1853 for Thomas Corse Gilmour, English Cotton Merchant, Isaac Thayer, architect-builder. Sold by Gilmour heirs in 1882 to John M. Parker, whose son, John M. Parker Jr., lived here and later served as Governor of Louisiana (1920-1924). The dining room extension with bay window was added by Mrs. Sarah Roberta Buckner, widow of John M. Parker, between 1897 and 1899. (Marker by New Orleans Landmarks Commission, 1987)
- Bradish Johnson House, 2341 Prytania Street, erected in 1872, the design of this post-Civil War mansion of a prominent Louisiana sugar planter, attributed to James Freret, architect, reflects the influence of the French "Ecole des Beaux Arts," where he studied from 1860 to 1862. Residence of Walter Denegre 1892–1929, Louise S. McGehee School since 1929. (Marker by Orleans Parish Landmarks Commission)

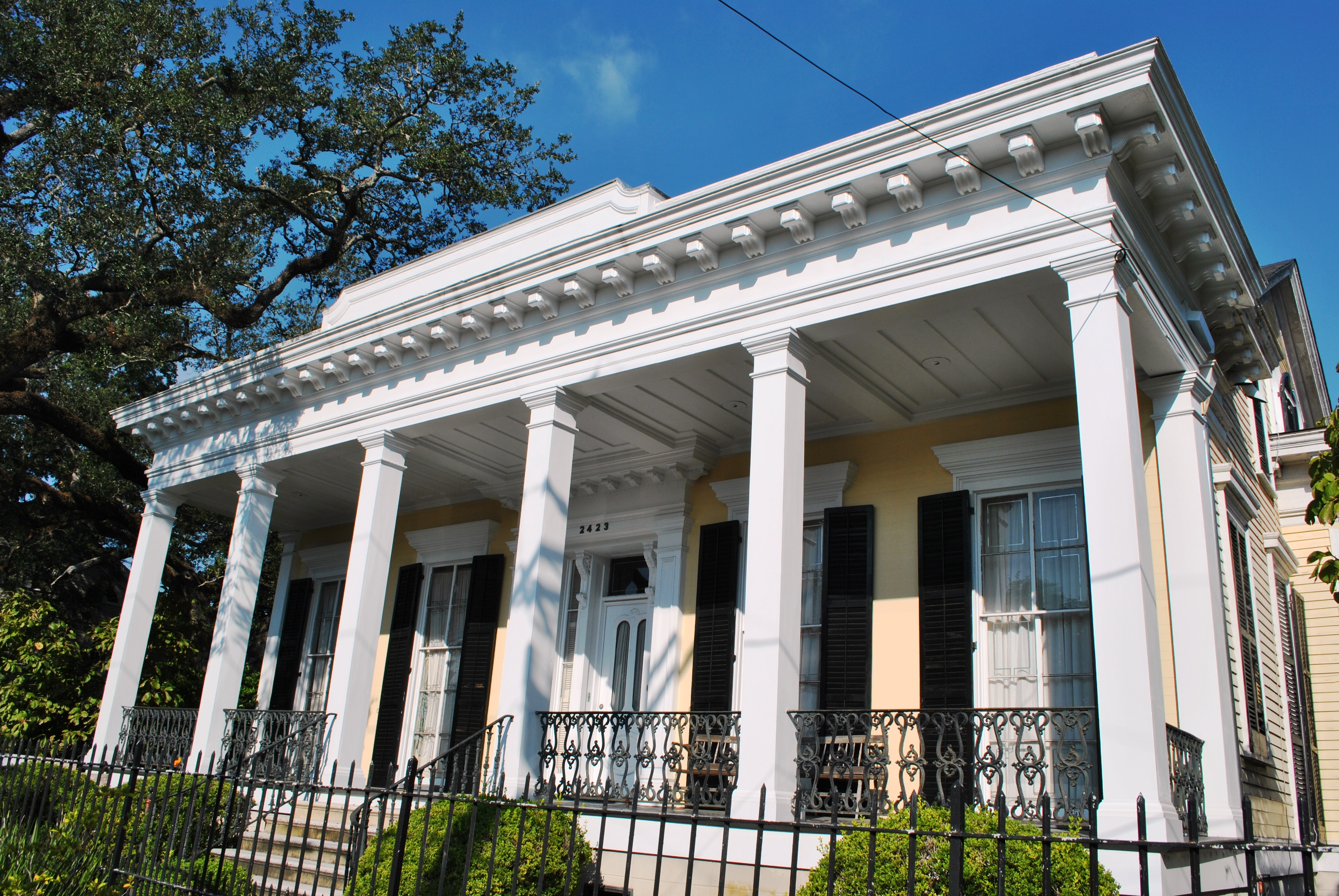
Adam-Jones House

- Adam-Jones House, 2423 Prytania Street, erected for John I. Adams, merchant, who in 1860 purchased the Garden District part of the former plantation of Jacques Francois de Livaudais, built the Adam-Jones House and made it his residence until 1896. Subsequent family ownerships were Ferdinand Reusch (1896-1921), Mrs. William Preston Johnston (1921-1926), Woodruff George (1926-1961). Restored in 1961-1962 by Mrs. Hamilton Polk Jones. (Marker by New Orleans Landmarks Commission, 1995)

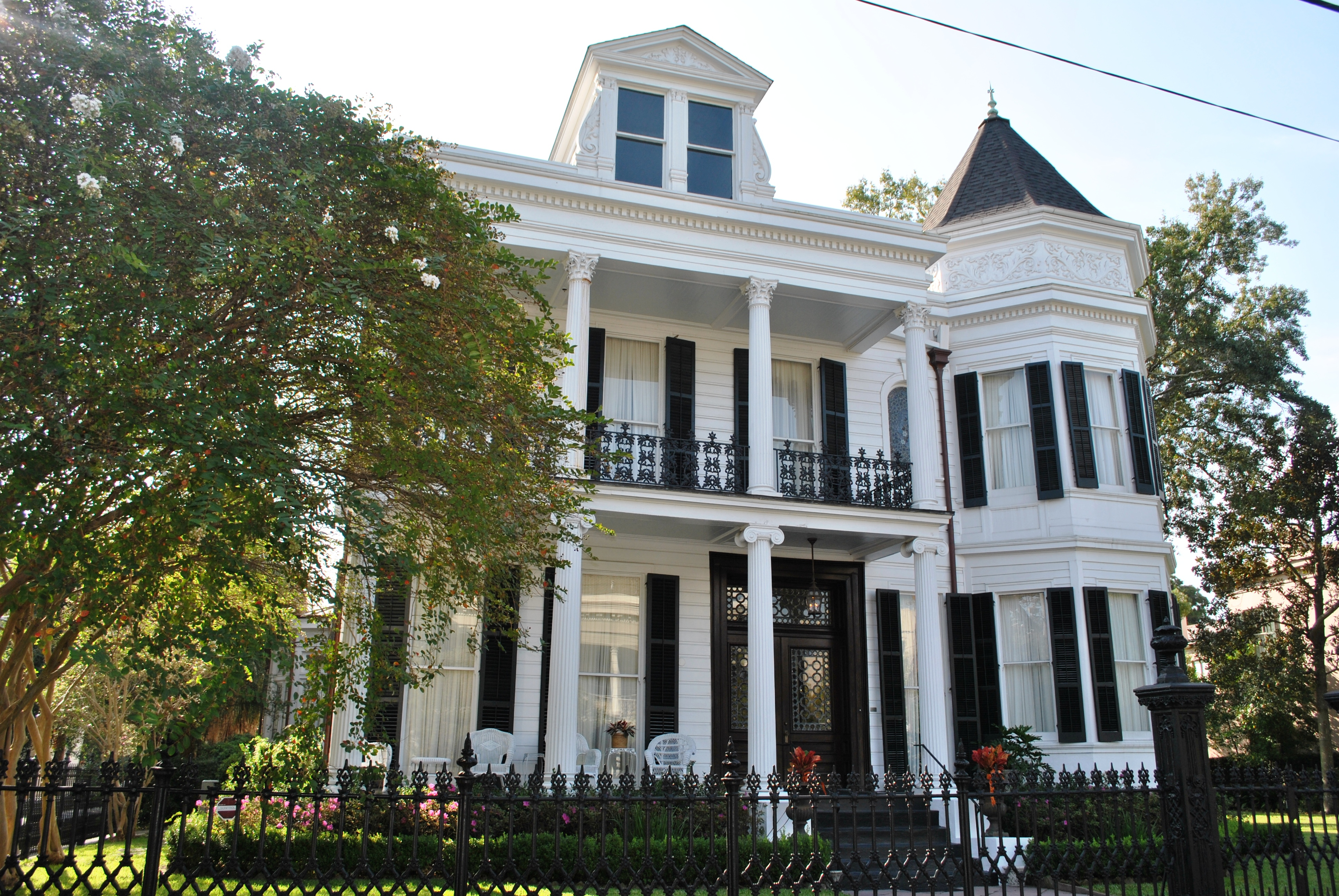
Women's Guild of the New Orleans Opera Association

- Women's Guild of the New Orleans Opera Association, 2500 Prytania Street, Greek Revival design by architect William Alfred Freret, was built for Edward A. Davis in 1859. Dr. and Mrs. Herman de Bachelle Seebold purchased the home in 1944 and donated the mansion, furnishings and art in 1965 to the Women's Guild of the New Orleans Opera Association. (Marker by Women's Guild of the New Orleans Opera Association)
- R.N. Girling's "English Apothecary", 2726 Prytania Street. Robert Nash Girling established his "English Apothecary" which he operated from the 1880s-1890s. An Englishman by birth, Girling studied pharmacy in England and at the Ecole de Pharmacie in Paris. In the early 1870s he immigrated with his wife to New Orleans, where he soon advertised as a "Druggist and Chemist". His embossed glass bottles read "R.N. Girling, Accuracy and Purity, Pharmacist and Chemist, New Orleans". A founder of the Louisiana Pharmaceutical Association in 1882, he served as its second president, and was instrumental in Louisiana becoming the first state in the nation to license pharmacists. After his death in 1894, this site continued to be used as a pharmacy until the 1950s. Also known as "Maisonette Creole", in 1832 it was a part of Jefferson Parish and was known as the Livaudais Plantation. Restored by Fannie Mae Goldman in 1960. (Marker by his descendants, October, 2004)

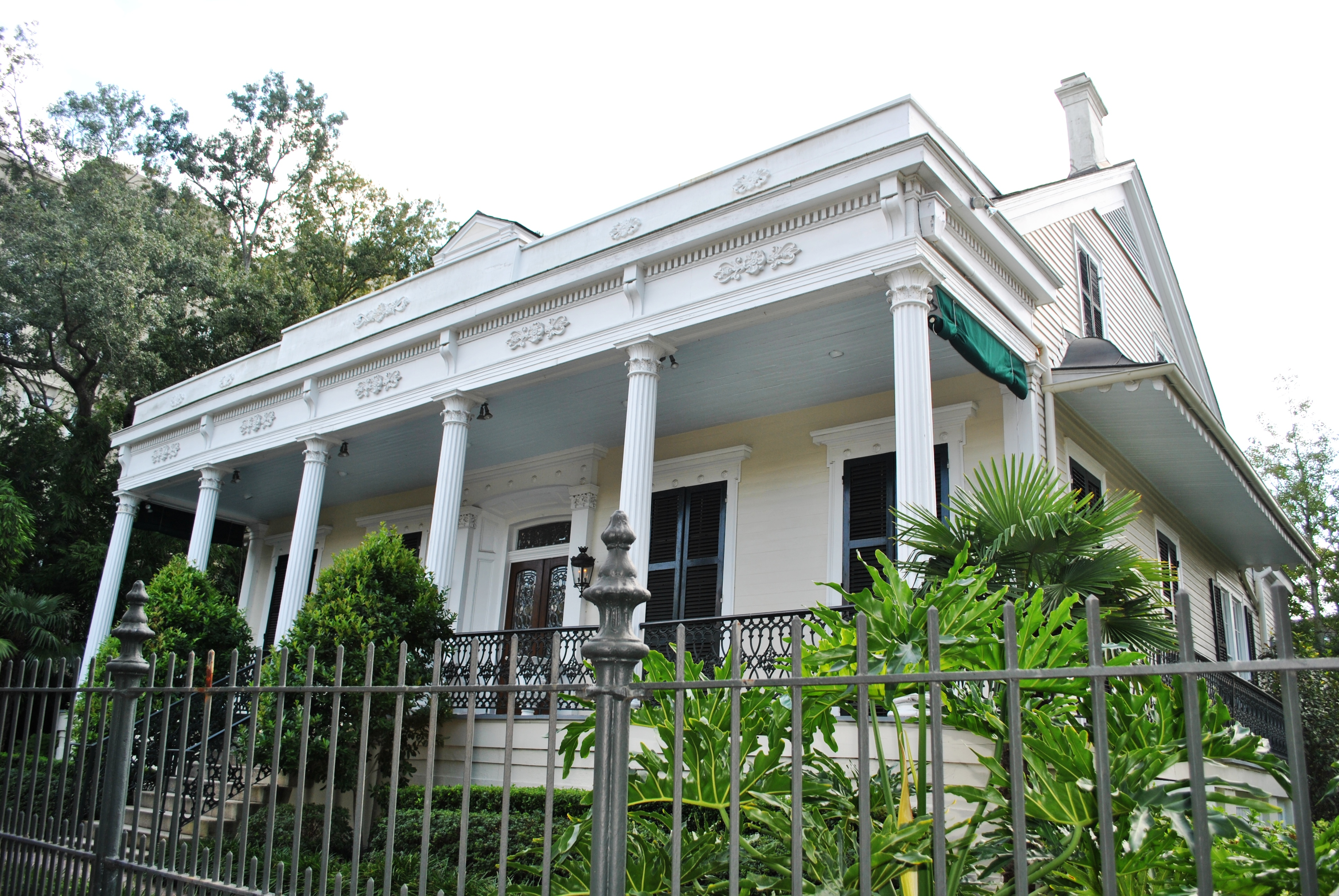
Claiborne Cottage

- Claiborne Cottage, 2727 Prytania Street, a raised, center-hall, Greek Revival cottage, built in 1857 by John Vittie for Sophronie Claiborne Marigny, daughter of Louisiana's first Governor, Lady of French Queen Amelie's court, and wife of Mandeville de Marigny, a prominent political and military figure. After several subsequent owners, the Society of Redemptorists purchased the cottage in 1923 with the intention of building a church in its place. Instead, the structure served as Bon Secours Grammar School 1923–1925, Redemptorist High School 1925–1929, Sisters of Mercy Convent 1929–1953, and Provincial House of the Redemptorist Vice Provincialate 1953–1955. The house was restored as a private residence in 1980. In 1995 it was acquired by the Rice family. (Marker by Orleans Parish Landmarks Commission, 1995)

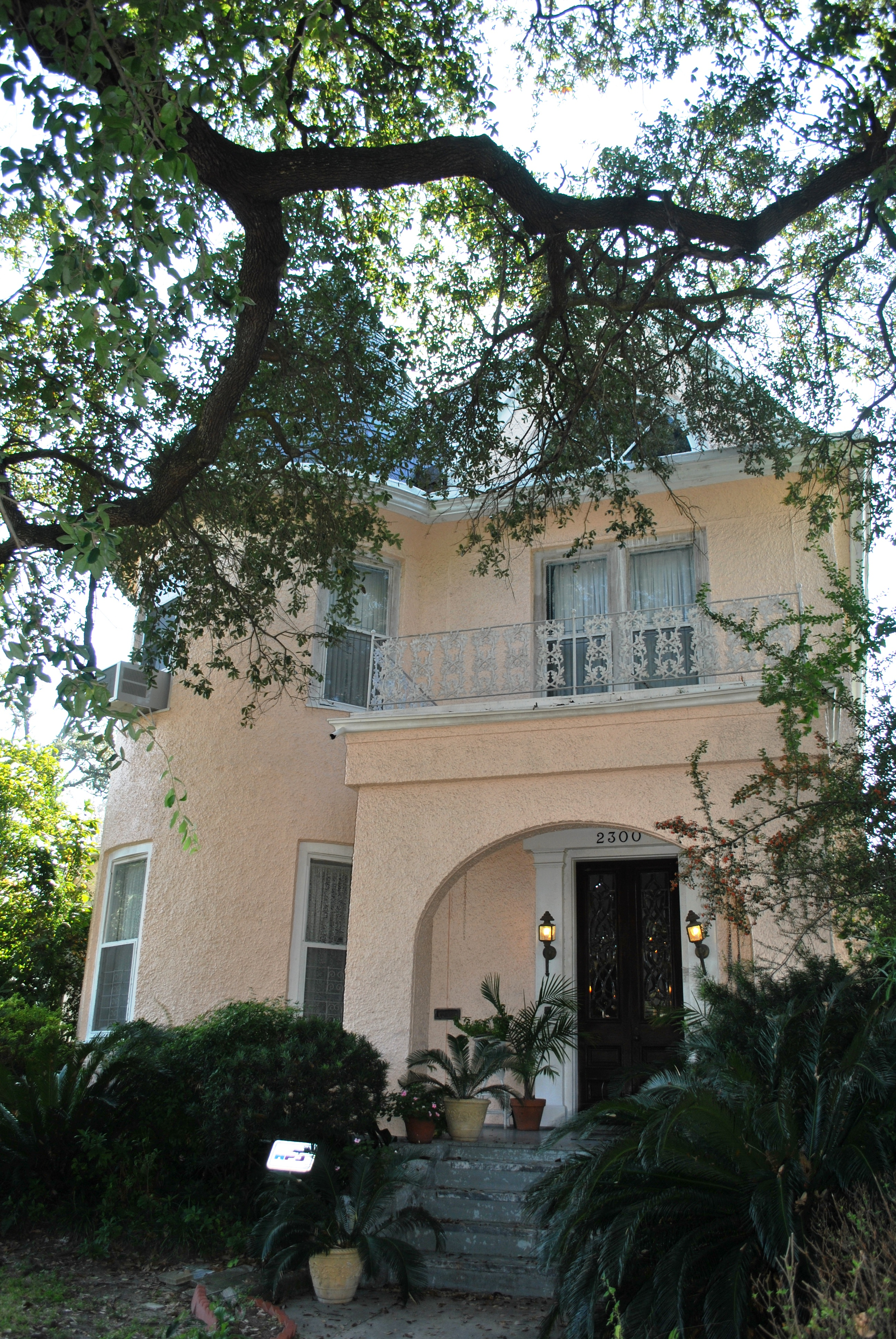
Penrose-Sere House, New Orleans

- Penrose-Sere House, corner of Prytania and Philip Street, completed on June 16, 1894, the first house designed and built by Frank P. Graveley, architect for George B. Penrose, New Orleans City Treasurer.
- 1134 First Street, site of Jefferson Davis's death on December 6, 1889; then the home of Louisiana Supreme Court Justice Charles E. Fenner. "Born at Fairview, Kentucky, in June 3, 1808, U.S. Army (1828-1835), he served in Black Hawk War. Congressman U.S. (1845-1846), Colonel Mississippi Volunteers in War with Mexico, rendered Gallant Service in the taking of Monterey and Buena Vista where he was severely wounded. Senator U.S. (1847-1851), Secretary of War U.S. (1853-1857), Senator U.S. (1857-1861), President C.S.A. (1861-1865), Prisoner Fortress Monroe (1865-1867)." (Marker by Ladies Confederate Memorial Association, May 17, 1930)

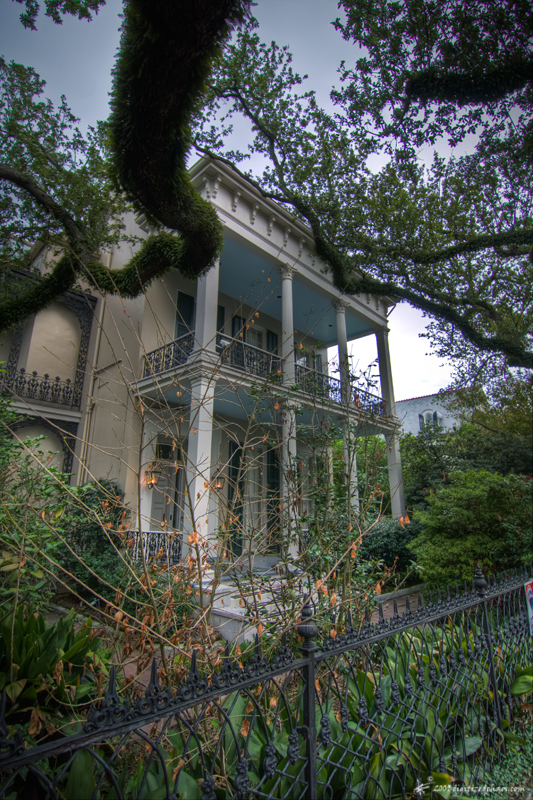
Brevard-Rice House

- Brevard-Rice House, 1239 First Street, built in 1857 for Albert Hamilton Brevard, James H. Calrow, architect, Charles Pride, builder. Owned by Brevard heirs until 1869 and then purchased by Emory Clapp, who added the library wing on the left. It remained in the Clapp family until 1935. It was then owned and occupied by the families of Dr. Frank Brostrom from 1935 to 1947, Judge John Minor Wisdom from 1947 to 1972, and John A. Mmahat from 1972 to 1988. Purchased in 1989 by the novelist Anne Rice and her husband, the poet and painter Stan Rice. (Marker by New Orleans Landmarks Commission, 1991)
- Colonel Short's Villa, 1448 Fourth Street, a sprawling antebellum estate with an ornate cornstalk wrought iron fence. Built in 1859 for Colonel Robert H. Short of Kentucky, Commission merchant, Henry Howard, architect, and Robert Huyghe, builder. In 1832 the property, which was part of the Livaudais Plantation was subdivided into city squares. On September 1, 1862, the house was seized by the federal forces occupying the city as property of an assent rebel. In March 1864 the house briefly served as the executive mansion of the newly elected Federal Governor of Louisiana Michael Hahn. It then became the residence of Major General Nathaniel P. Banks, U.S. Commander, Department of the Gulf. On August 15, 1865, the house was returned to Colonel Short by the U.S. Government and he lived in it until his death in 1890. An addition was made in 1906 and the house was restored in 1950. The unusual cast iron morning-glory and cornstalk fence was furnished by the Philadelphia foundry of Wood and Miltenberger. (Marker by New Orleans Landmarks Commission, 1978)
- The George Washington Cable House, 1313 8th Street, is a National Historic Landmark.
- The Manse, 2328 Coliseum Street, erected in 1859 for Hannah Killingley Walford, widow of Edmund W. Briggs, agent for London Unity Insurance Company, William Alfred Freret, architect. Purchased in 1871 by the Prytania Street Presbyterian Church for use as the minister's residence. The bay containing the minister's study was added at that time. The last minister to live here was the Rev. Dr. William McFadden Alexander. His widow, Ceneilla Bower Alexander, artist noted for designing Rex Carnival parade floats, purchased the house from the church in 1947. (Marker by New Orleans Landmarks Commission, 2001)

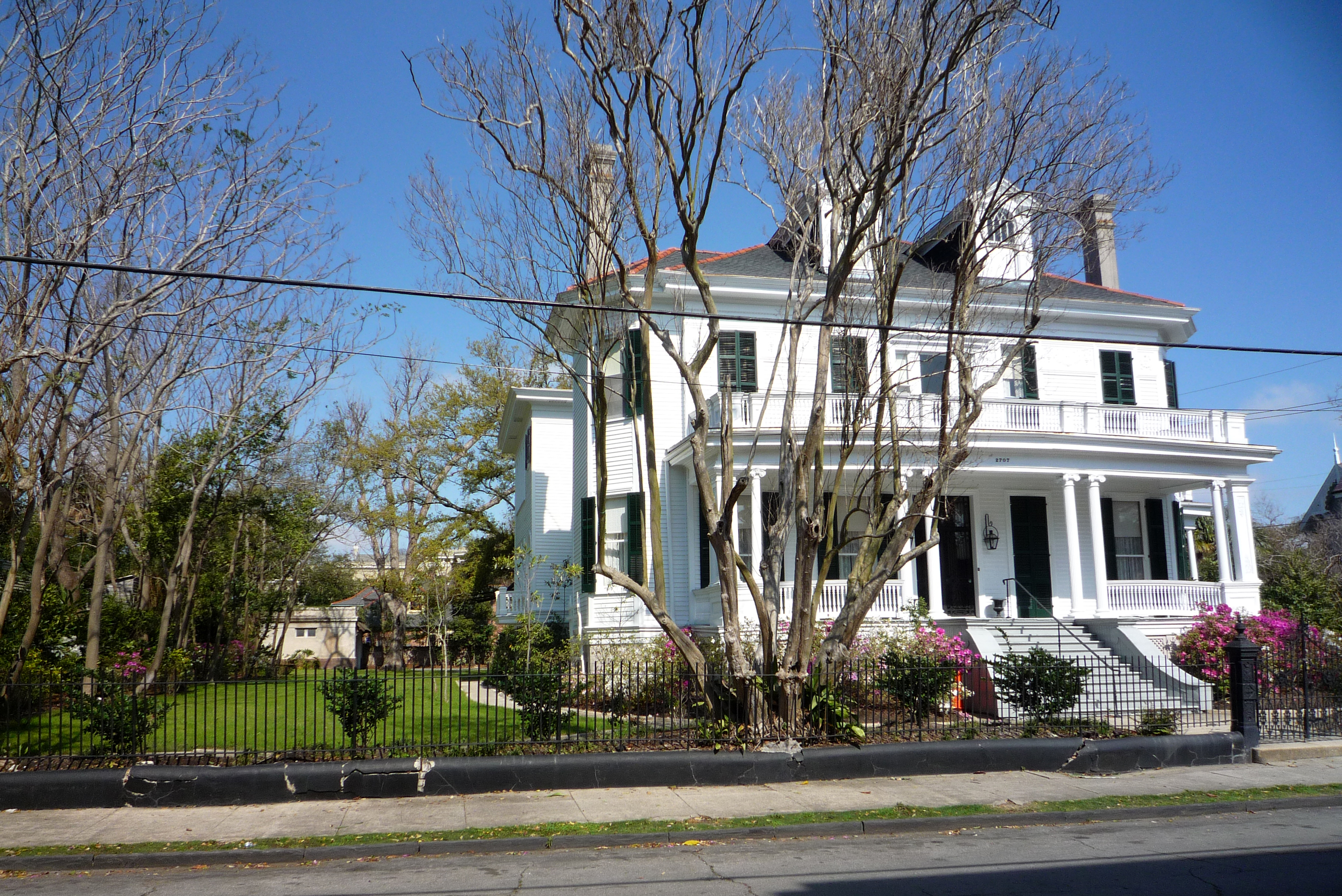
Home used in the 2008 film The Curious Case of Benjamin Button

- 2707 Coliseum Street, site of the childhood home featured in the 2008 film The Curious Case of Benjamin Button.
- Goldsmith-Godchaux House, 1122 Jackson Ave: "Designed by noted nineteenth century architect Henry Howard in 1859. Significant for its painted interiors. Has more fresco wall decoration and stenciling than probably any other mid-nineteenth century residence in the South." (Marker by Department of Culture, Recreation and Tourism, 1980)
- Trinity Church Episcopal, 1329 Jackson Avenue, founded in 1847. Erected in 1852–54, George Purves, Architect-Builder, in 1867 the chancel was extended 32 feet. The entrance tower was added in 1873, Charles L. Hillger, Architect, Peter R. Middlemiss, Builder. The parish house in the rear was built in 1909, Samuel Stanhope Labouisse, Architect. The marker was given in memory of F. Monroe Labouisse Jr. (1939-1986) by the Louisiana Landmarks Society. (Marker by Orleans Parish Landmarks Commission, 1987)

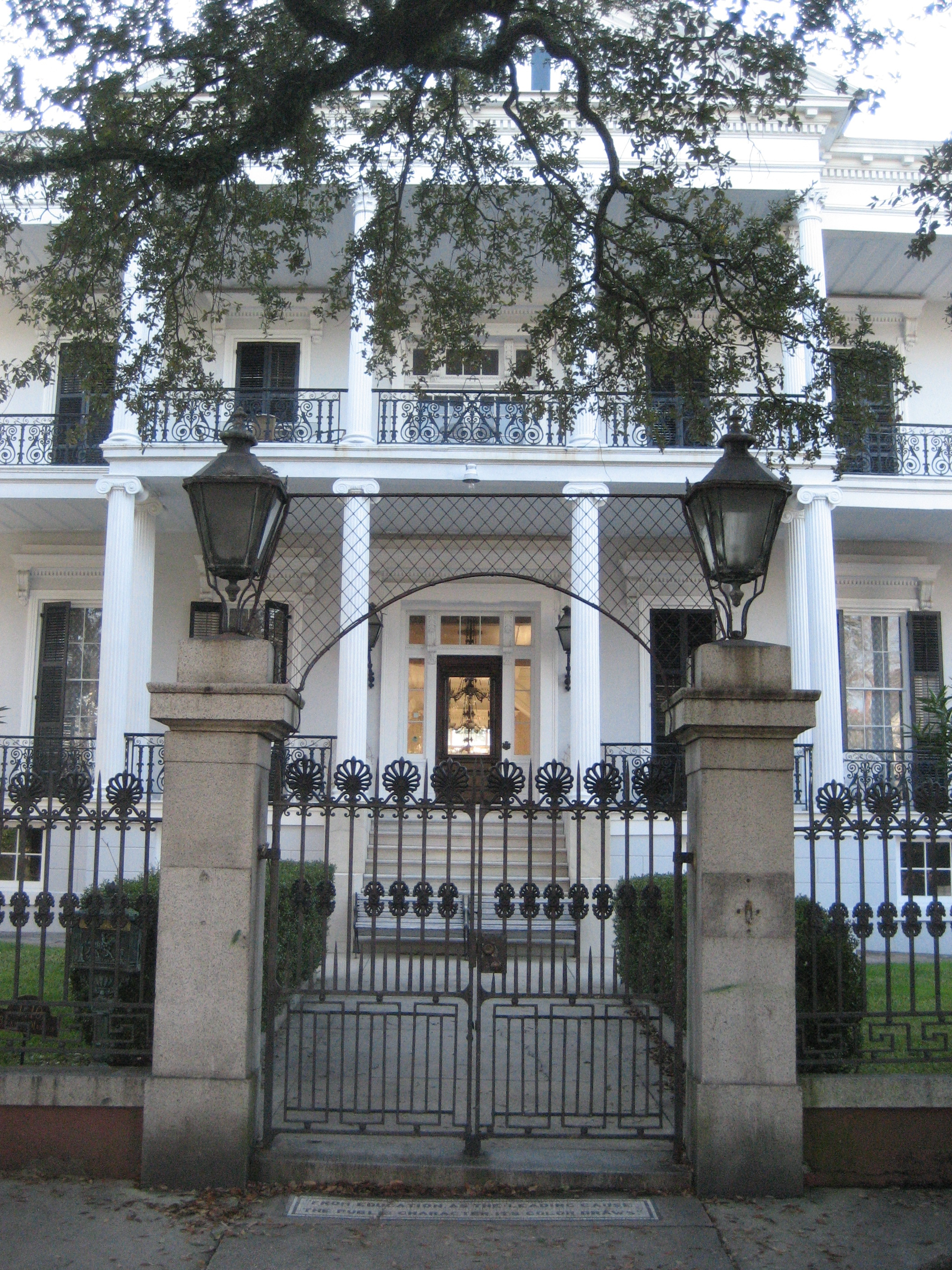
Entrance to Buckner Mansion/former Soule College building

- Buckner Mansion, 1410 Jackson Avenue, an opulent 1856 mansion featured in American Horror Story: Coven.
- Lafayette Cemetery No. 1, 1420 Washington Avenue, established in 1833 by the City of Lafayette. The square was acquired from Cornelius Hurst and the cemetery laid out by Benjamin Buisson, city surveyor. Part of the Livaudais Plantation which had been subdivided into city squares in 1832. The cemetery contains many fine and historic tombs, among them those of Samuel Jarvis Peters, father of the New Orleans public school system, and General Harry T. Hays, distinguished confederate general. At Lafayette Cemetery No. 1 are buried many persons of German and Irish origin who lived in the City of Lafayette. The typical New Orleans burial vaults adjoining Washington Avenue were restored and magnolia trees on the cross aisle replanted by the City of New Orleans when Victor H. Schiro was mayor. (Marker by New Orleans Landmarks Commission, 1970)

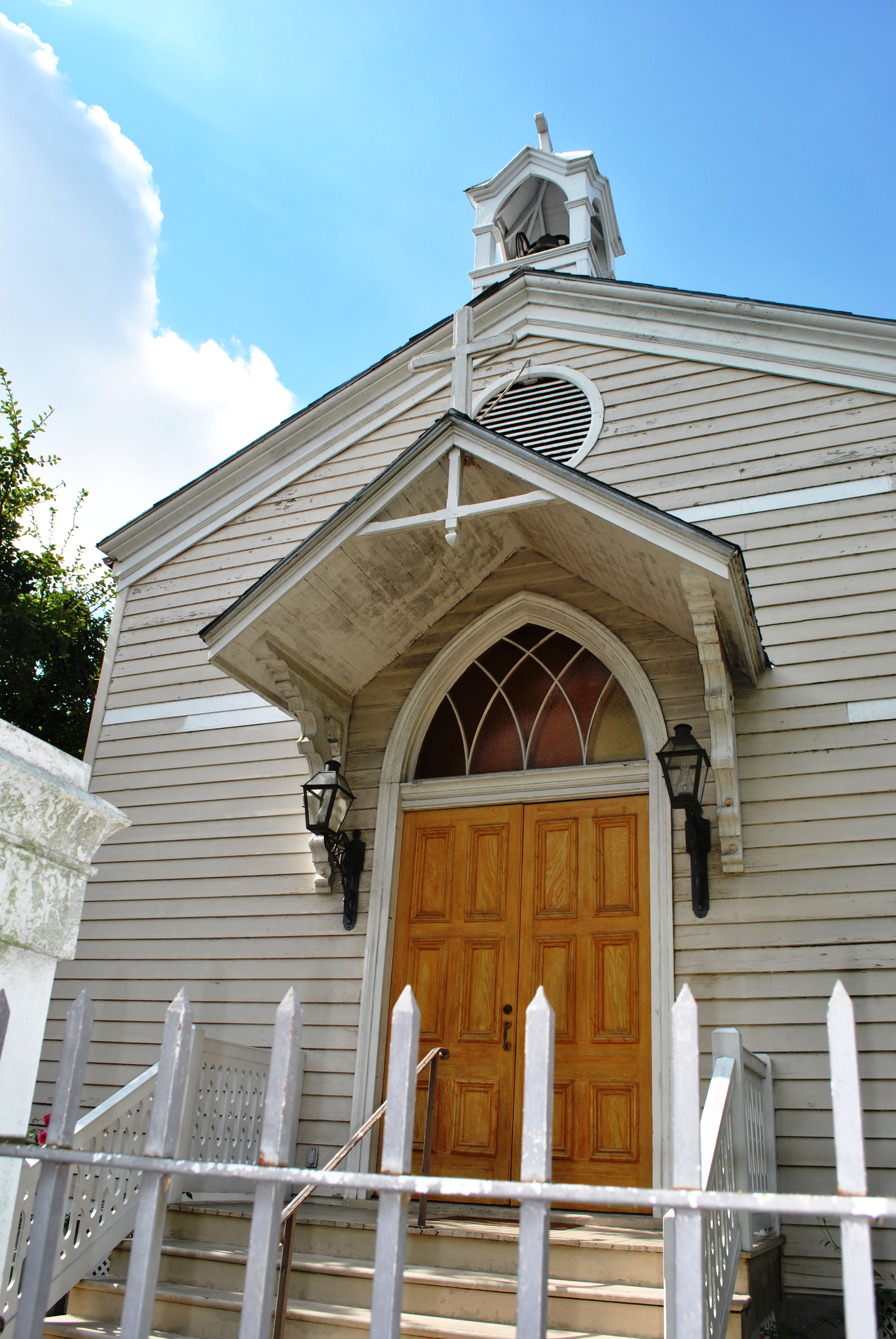
St. Mary's Chapel

- St. Mary's Chapel, 1516 Jackson Avenue, built in 1844 as St. Mary's Assumption church on Josephine Street near Constance Street. Planned by Father Peter Czackert, C.Ss.R., it was the first Roman Catholic church in what was at that time the city of Lafayette and the first church for German-speaking Catholics in the state of Louisiana. After the present St. Mary's Assumption Church was dedicated in 1860, the original church was relocated to St. Joseph's cemetery, no 1, in 1863. In 1997 the church was rebuilt on the current site to replace Our Mother of Perpetual Help Chapel, established in 1925 at 2523 Prytania Street.
- Mayor Isaac W. Patton House, 1527 Washington Avenue, described in 1859 as "a handsome cottage residence," this Greek Revival house was erected for Lothrop Lewis Smith who purchased the site in 1853. It was his residence until he left New Orleans in 1859 and sold the house in 1861 to Mrs. Adolphe Jerome Odier. From 1873 until his death in 1890, it was the home of Isaac W. Patton, mayor of the City of New Orleans, 1878–1880. The entire square was sold in 1832 to H.W. Hills and William Lord Roberson by Matthew Morgan, Samuel J. Peters, Levi Peirce and William H. Chase, who in that year subdivided the Livaudais Plantation as Faubourg Livaudais, a part of the city of Lafayette that was annexed to the city of New Orleans in 1852. (Marker by New Orleans Landmarks Commission, 1985)
- Commander's Palace, 1403 Washington Avenue, founded in 1880, is one of the city's most famous restaurants. In 1832 the site was part of the J.F.E. Livaudais Plantation and was acquired under French grant. Prior to 1880 the property formed a part of the City of Lafayette, Jefferson Parish, Louisiana. Dedicated in 1944 to "Dining in the Grand Manner" by Frank and Eleanore Moran. (Marker by Mr. & Mrs. Frank and Eleanore Moran, 1944)

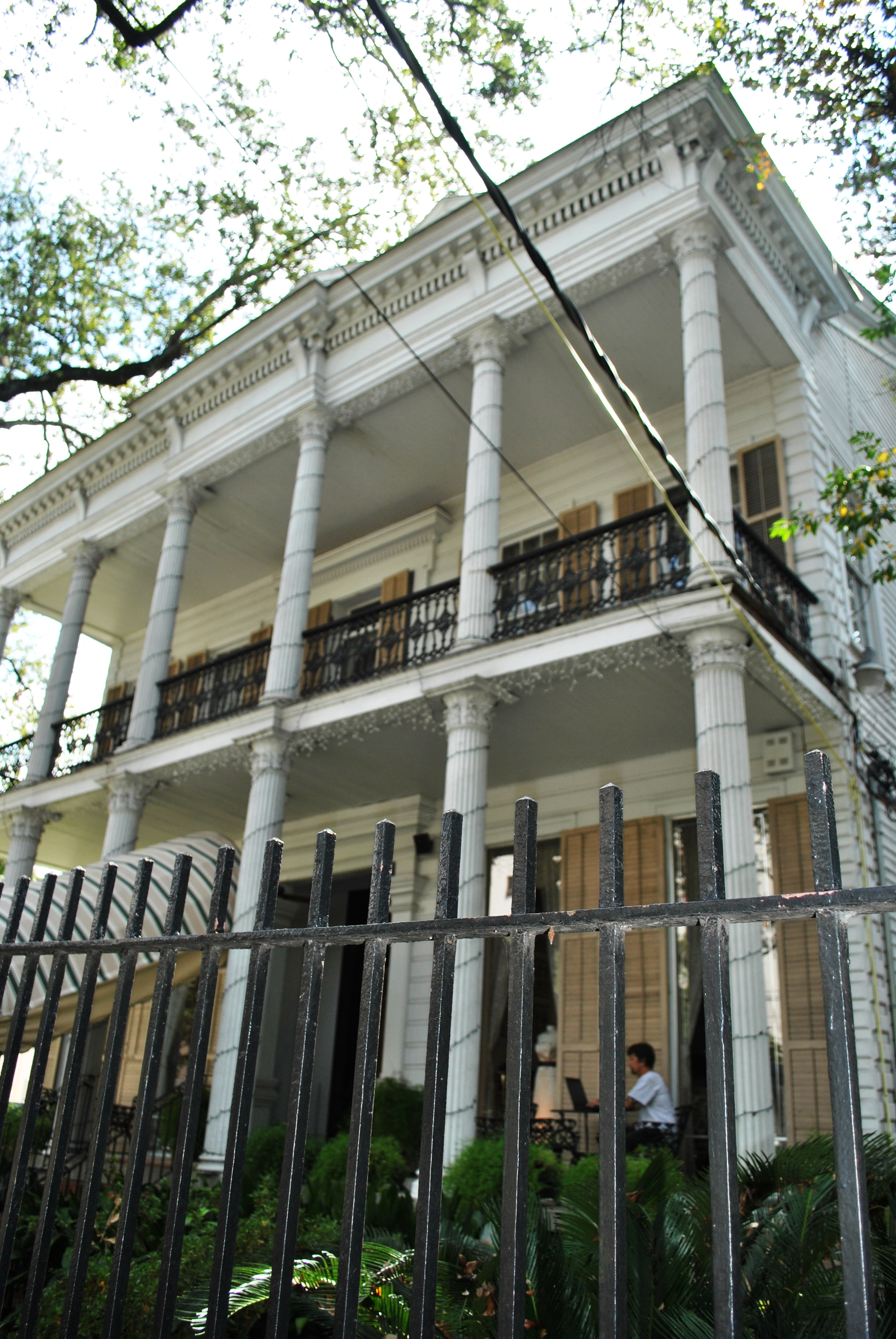
Squires House

- Squires House, 2220 St. Charles Avenue, built in 1851 as one-and-half story Greek Revival residence for George Washington Squires, a commercial merchant. The house was remodeled to its present appearance in 1884 by builder James Kelly for William Renaud, a grocer and commercial merchant. In 1920, the Liberty Shop, known for its gowns and regalia for carnival royalty, began to lease the property. The House of Broel, a dress shop, began operations at Squires House in 1970.

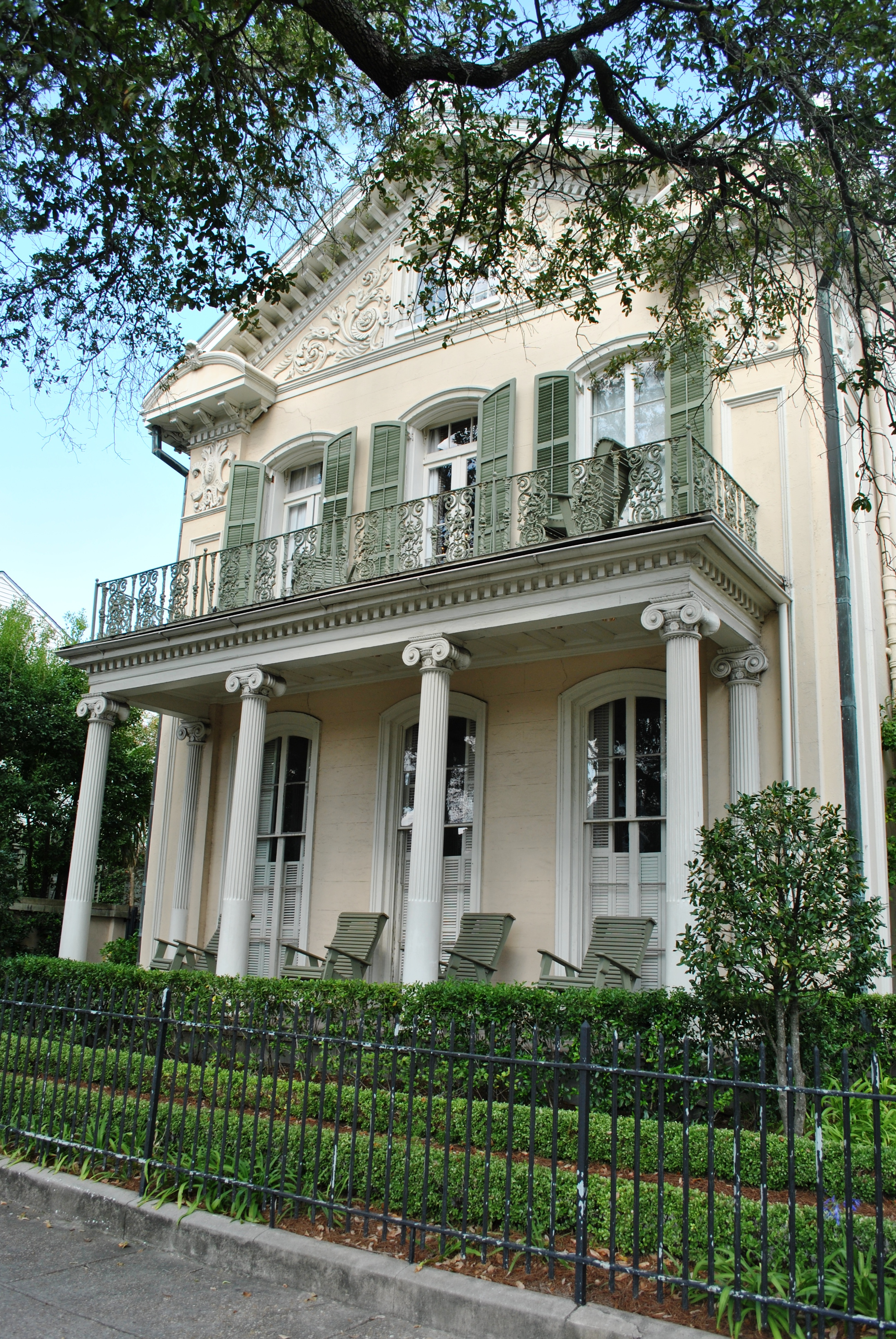
Alfred Grima House

- Alfred Grima House, 2701 St. Charles Avenue, built in 1857 in the Greek Revival style by Cornelius Bicknell Payne, sold in 1861 to Thomas L. Clarke. Acquired from the Clarke family in 1890 by Alfred Grima, attorney, extensively remodeled in 1891, Paul Andry, architect, John McNally, builder. The side formal garden was completed in 1925, Charles R. Armstrong, architect, and the garden trellis was built in 1926, the last work of Samuel S. Labouisse, architect. Residence at the time of her death in 1981 of Clarisse Claiborne Grima, widow of Alfred Grima Jr., who donated it to the Historic New Orleans Collection. Acquired by private ownership in 1987. (Marker by Orleans Parish Landmarks Commission)
- Other neighborhood landmarks include the historic Anshe Sfard synagogue, numerous antebellum mansions, and "The Rink", a 19th-century skating rink building that has been converted into a small shopping mall.

== Hydrology and storms ==
The flooding potential in New Orleans has been noted since at least the 1820s. (Bernhard, 1828) Although experiencing wind damage from Hurricane Katrina in 2005, this area on old high ground escaped the extensive flooding of much of the rest of the city (see: Effects of Hurricane Katrina in New Orleans). Wind damage from Katrina was the most noticeable effect. The rate of return of residents after Katrina was almost 100 percent. (National Trust, 2006) Part of the area nearest St. Charles Avenue was surveyed to be only four feet above mean sea level, compared to a Mississippi River height of 14 feet (4.3 m) above sea level; (Hogan, 1990) nevertheless, the Garden District suffered little from Katrina flooding.

== Government and infrastructure ==
The Garden District is within the 6th District of the New Orleans Police Department.

== Transportation ==
The New Orleans Regional Transit Authority provides public transportation. The streetcar is easily accessible from St. Charles Avenue. Streetcar fare is $1.25 per person.

== Education ==
The Garden District is zoned to schools in the Orleans Parish School Board (RSD).

The charter school Batiste Cultural Arts Academy, in the former Live Oak Elementary School building, is located in the Irish Channel community near the Garden District. Other public elementary schools in the vicinity include Laurel Elementary School (Lower Garden District) and Benjamin Franklin Elementary School. Public high schools in the vicinity include McMain High School and McDonogh 35 High School.

The McGehee School, a private girls' school, is within the boundaries of the Garden District and Association. In addition the Trinity School of New Orleans is in the area.

After 1923, Soule Business College, a private professional school, was located in the Garden District. There was a private school named the Garden District Academy, formed in 1959.

Alliance Française of New Orleans, the French cultural and language center of New Orleans, one of the chapters of the international organization Alliance Française, is located on 1519 Jackson Street since 1987

== Notable residents ==
- Drew Brees
- Sandra Bullock
- Nicolas Cage
- Mos Def
- John Goodman
- Gloria Henry
- Archie Manning
- Eli Manning
- Lola the Vamp
- Peyton Manning
- Pretty Lights
- Trent Reznor
- Anne Rice
- Sean Yseult
- Walter Block

== See also ==
- Buildings and architecture of New Orleans
- History of New Orleans
- Neighborhoods in New Orleans
- St. Charles Streetcar Line
- Uptown New Orleans
- List of National Historic Landmarks in Louisiana
- National Register of Historic Places listings in Orleans Parish, Louisiana
- Historic Cemeteries of New Orleans
