= Freret =

Freret may refer to:

== People ==
- James Freret (1838–1897), American architect
- Nicolas Fréret (1688–1749), French scholar
- William Alfred Freret (1833–1911), American architect
- William Freret (1804–1864), twice mayor of New Orleans

== Places ==
- Freret, New Orleans, a neighborhood of the city of New Orleans
- 10303 Fréret, a minor planet
