= Sarah Morgan Dawson =

American diarist (1842–1909)

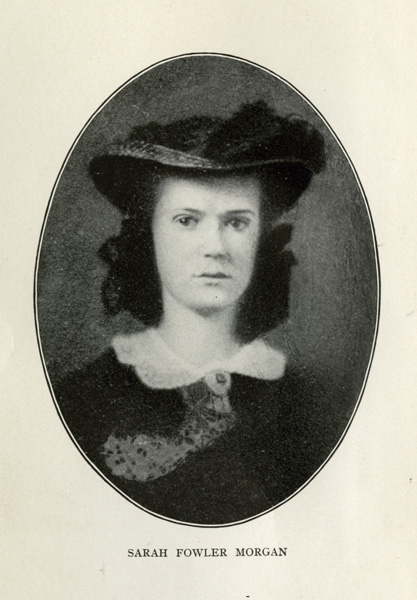
- Born: Sarah Fowler Morgan; February 28, 1842; New Orleans, Louisiana, U.S.
- Died: May 5, 1909 (aged 67); Paris, France
- Resting place: Saint Lawrence Cemetery
- Other name: Mr. Fowler
- Occupation: Writer
- Notable work: A Confederate Girl's Diary
- Spouse: Francis Warrington Dawson
- Children: 3

Sarah Fowler Morgan Dawson (February 28, 1842 – May 5, 1909) was an American diarist and editorial writer. She wrote editorials for the Charleston News & Courier using the pen name Mr. Fowler. Her diary, A Confederate Girl's Diary, was published posthumously in six volumes by her son. It was republished in 1991 under the title Sarah Morgan: The Civil War Diary of a Southern Woman.

== Early life ==
Dawson was born Sarah Fowler Morgan on February 28, 1842, in New Orleans to Judge Thomas Gibbes Morgan and Sarah Hunt Fowler Morgan. Dawson's father was born in New Jersey and educated in Pennsylvania while her mother, originally from New England, grew up on the Louisiana plantation of George Mather. Dawson was raised as a wealthy member of New Orleans' upper class. Her early childhood was spent in New Orleans until the family moved to Baton Rouge in 1850. The Morgan family lived in a large two-story house, with eight slaves, on Church Street near the State House. Although she received less than a year of formal schooling, Dawson studied French language and English literature at home with her mother and sisters.

== American Civil War ==
From March 1862 to April 1865, Dawson kept a diary, detailing her family's experiences during the American Civil War. Her brother, Henry Waller Fowler, was killed in a duel in the spring of 1861 and her father died several months later. Three of her brothers joined the Confederate States Armed Forces and one brother, James, became an officer in the Confederate Navy. Two of her brothers, Gibbes and George, died from disease in a Confederate camp in 1863. Throughout the early years of the war, Dawson and her mother and sisters moved back and forth between the countryside and Baton Rouge. Their home in Baton Rouge was raided by the Union Army, leaving them to abandon it and eventually relocate to Union-occupied New Orleans. Their New Orleans home was also raided by Union soldiers. After taking an oath of allegiance to the United States, the family remained in New Orleans for the remainder of the war, living with her eldest brother, Judge Philip Hickey Morgan. Dawson documented her family's escapes from Union sieges on Baton Rouge, her support for the Confederate States of America, experiencing kindness from Union soldiers, disapproval for women's secessionist banter, and despair over the South's future. The last pages of her diary recount the loss of her two brothers, the fall of the Confederacy, and the assassination of Abraham Lincoln.

== Later life and death ==
In 1872, they moved to Columbia, South Carolina, where Dawson began writing editorials for the Charleston News & Courier under the pen name "Mr. Fowler". She was a staunch feminist and supporter of women's equality, expressing her views in both her editorials and in her diary. She also wrote about marriage and women's education.

On January 27, 1874, she married her newspaper editor, an Englishman and former Confederate officer named Francis Warrington Dawson. They had three children. Following her husband's death in 1889, she moved to Paris to live with her son, Warrington Dawson, and stayed there until her death on May 5, 1909.

Her six-volume diary was first published posthumously by her son in 1913 as A Confederate Girl's Diary. In 1991, her diary was republished as Sarah Morgan: The Civil War Diary of a Southern Woman. According to legend, her ghost haunts the old Louisiana state house in Baton Rouge.
