= Old Post Office and Customshouse (Key West, Florida) =

Historic building in Key West, Florida, US

- Key West Custom House and Old Post Office
- U.S. National Register of Historic Places
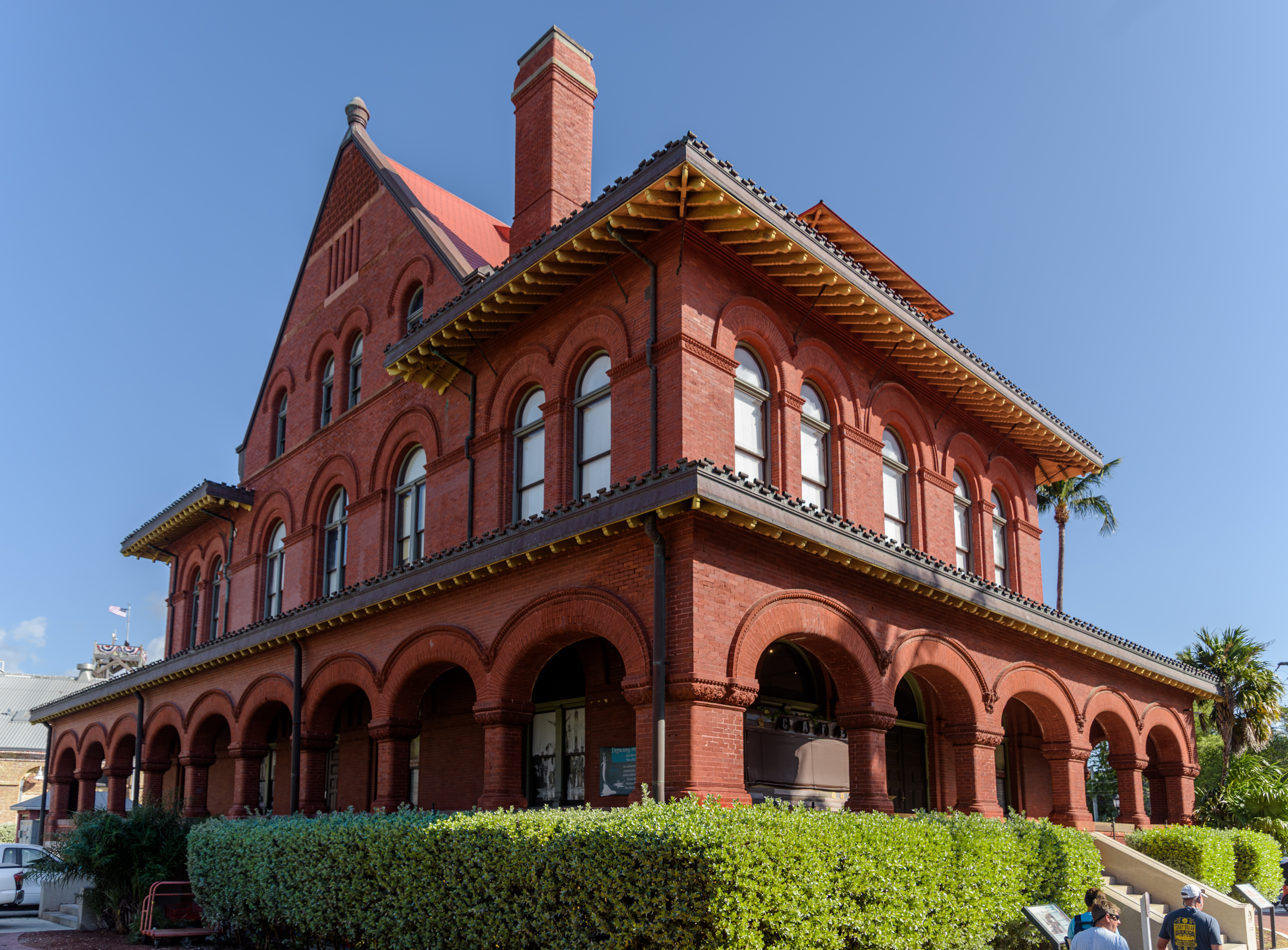
- Custom House in Key West, now the Key West Museum of Art and History.

- Location within Florida Location within the United States
- Location: 281 Front Street; Key West; Monroe County, Florida
- Coordinates: 24.55834°N 81.80697°W
- Built: 1889-1891
- Architect: William A. Freret
- Architectural style: Richardsonian Romanesque
- NRHP reference No.: 73000587
- Added to NRHP: September 20, 1973

The Custom House and Old Post Office is a historic site located at 281 Front Street, Key West, Florida, United States. On September 20, 1973, it was added to the U.S. National Register of Historic Places.

== Key West Museum of Art & History at the Custom House ==
The Custom House currently serves as the Key West Museum of Art & History, which is one of four museums operated by the Key West Art & Historical Society. Exhibits include local history, famous personalities including Ernest Hemingway, maritime history, and works by local artists.

The building was designed by architect William Kerr, and was completed in 1891. The United States District Court for the Southern District of Florida met here from its completion until 1932, when the building was transferred to the United States Navy.

== Gallery ==
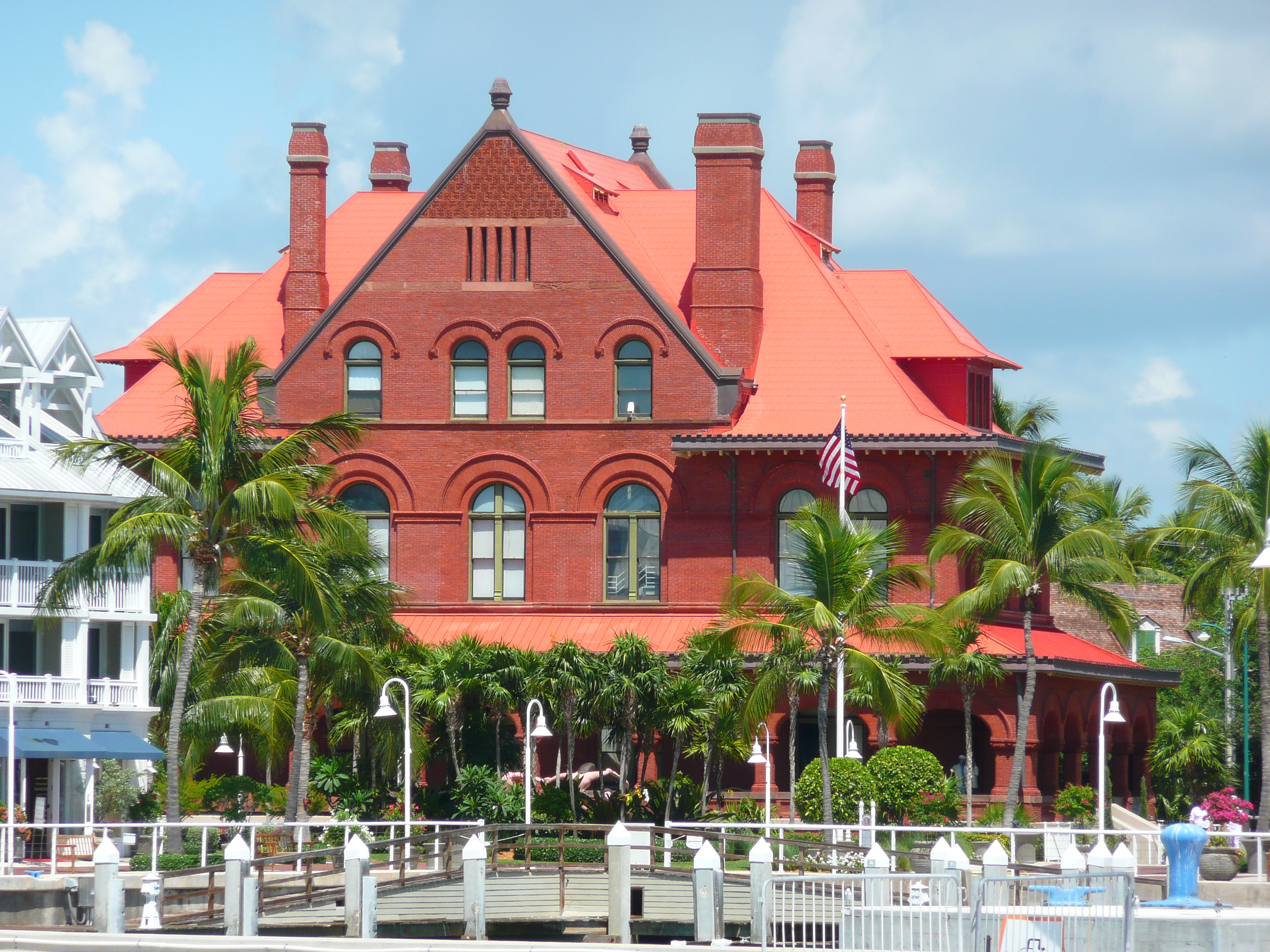
Back view from Port of Key West

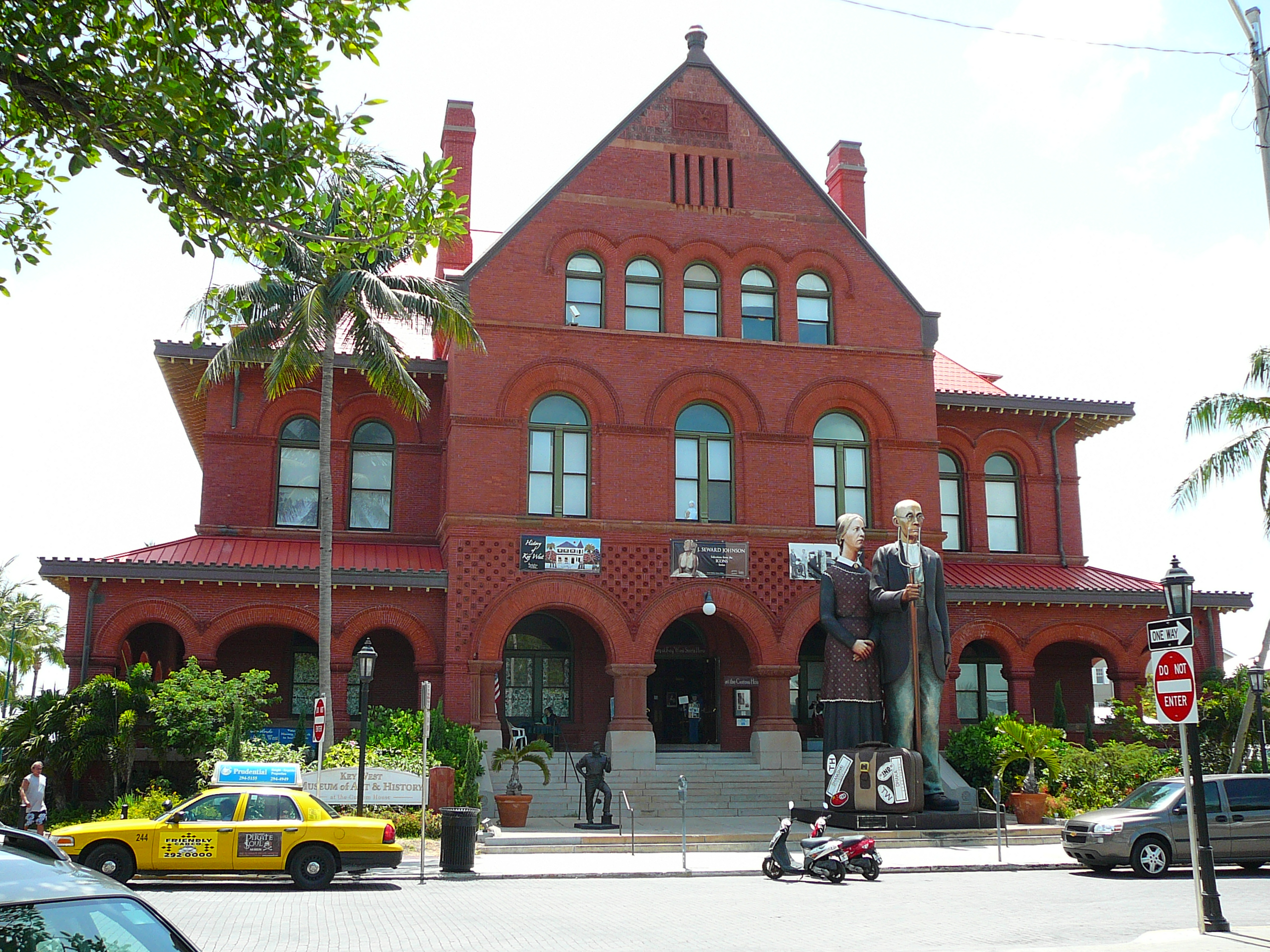
Museum in 2008 with American Gothic exhibit

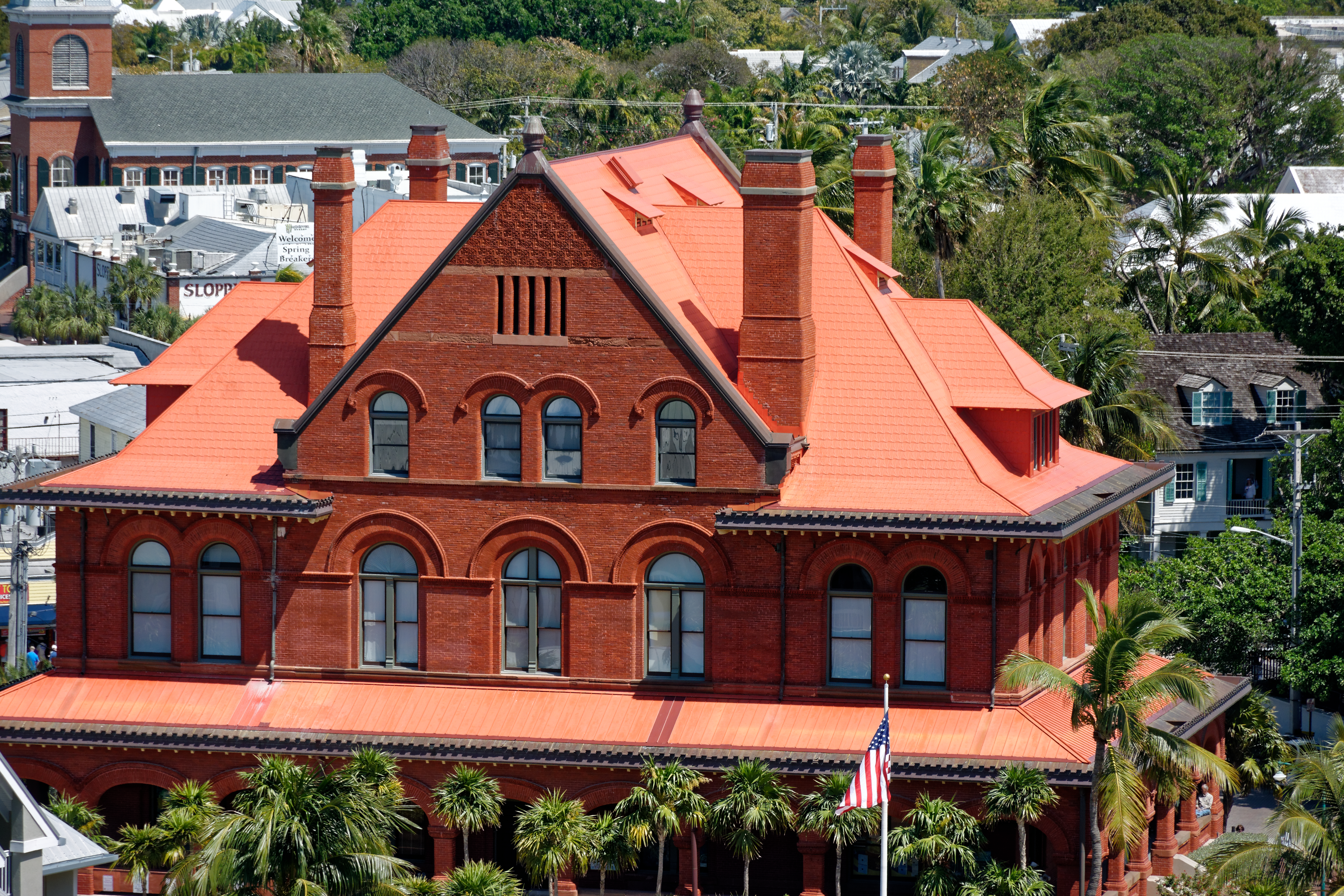
From the ocean side

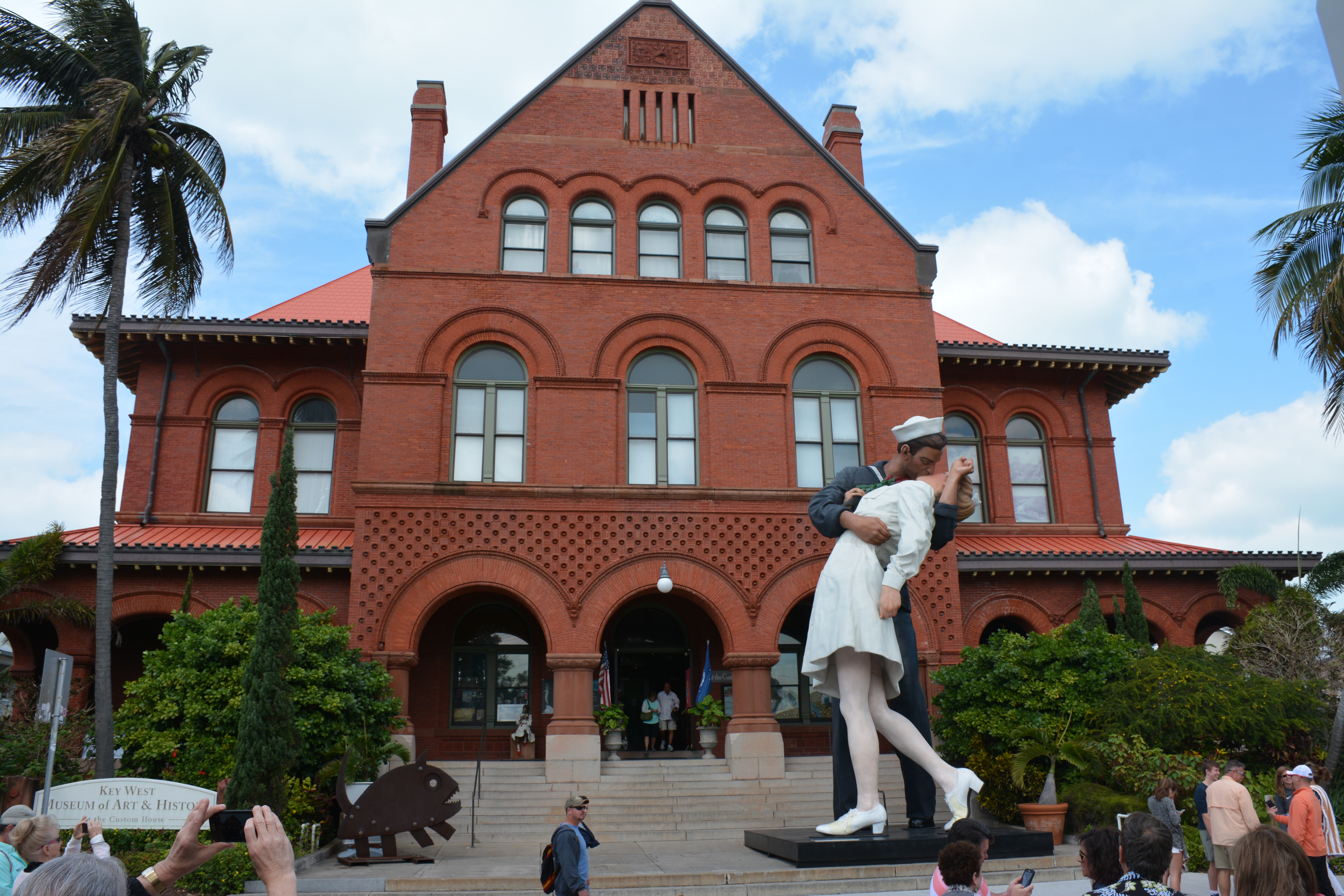
In 2017

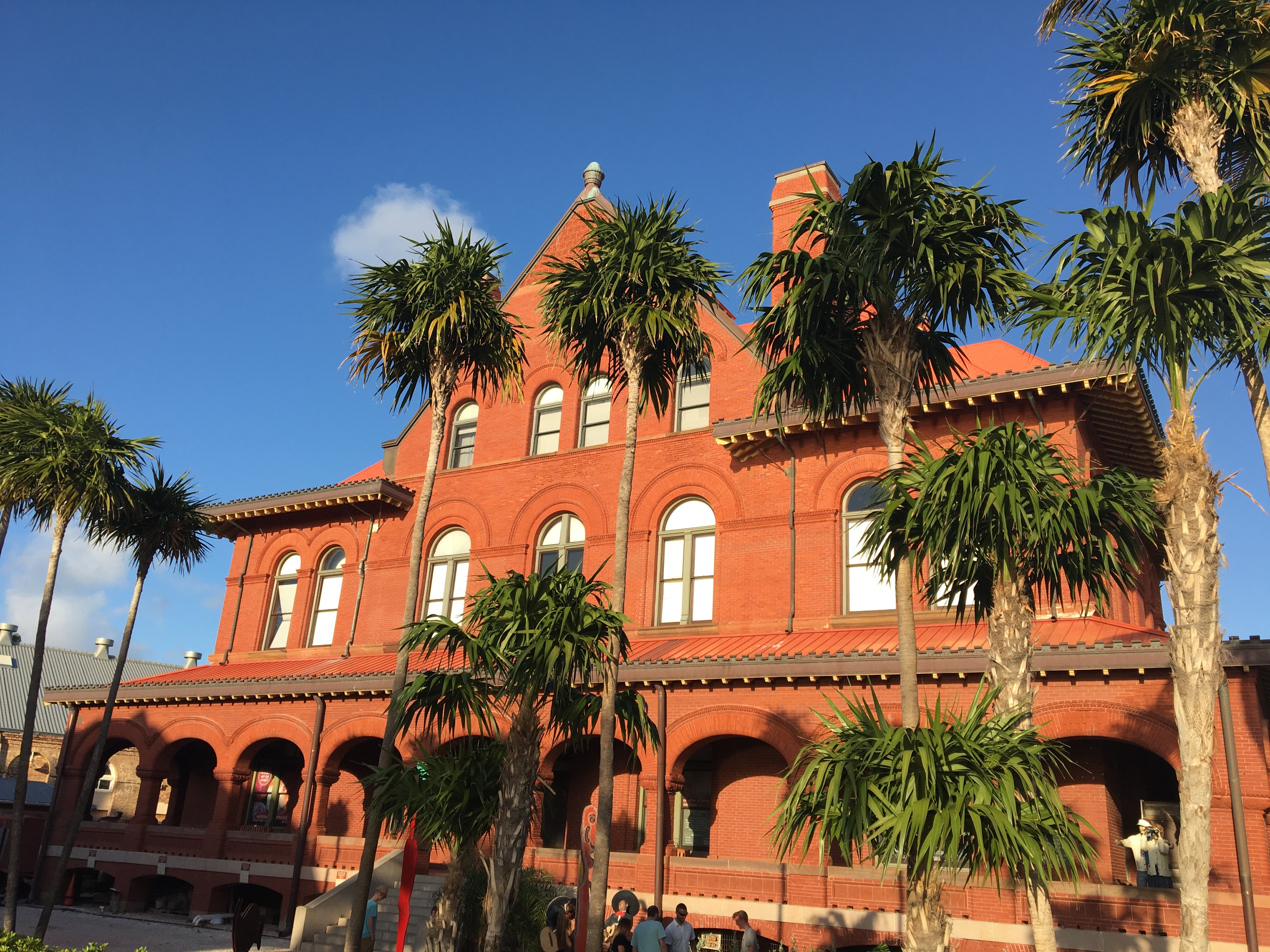

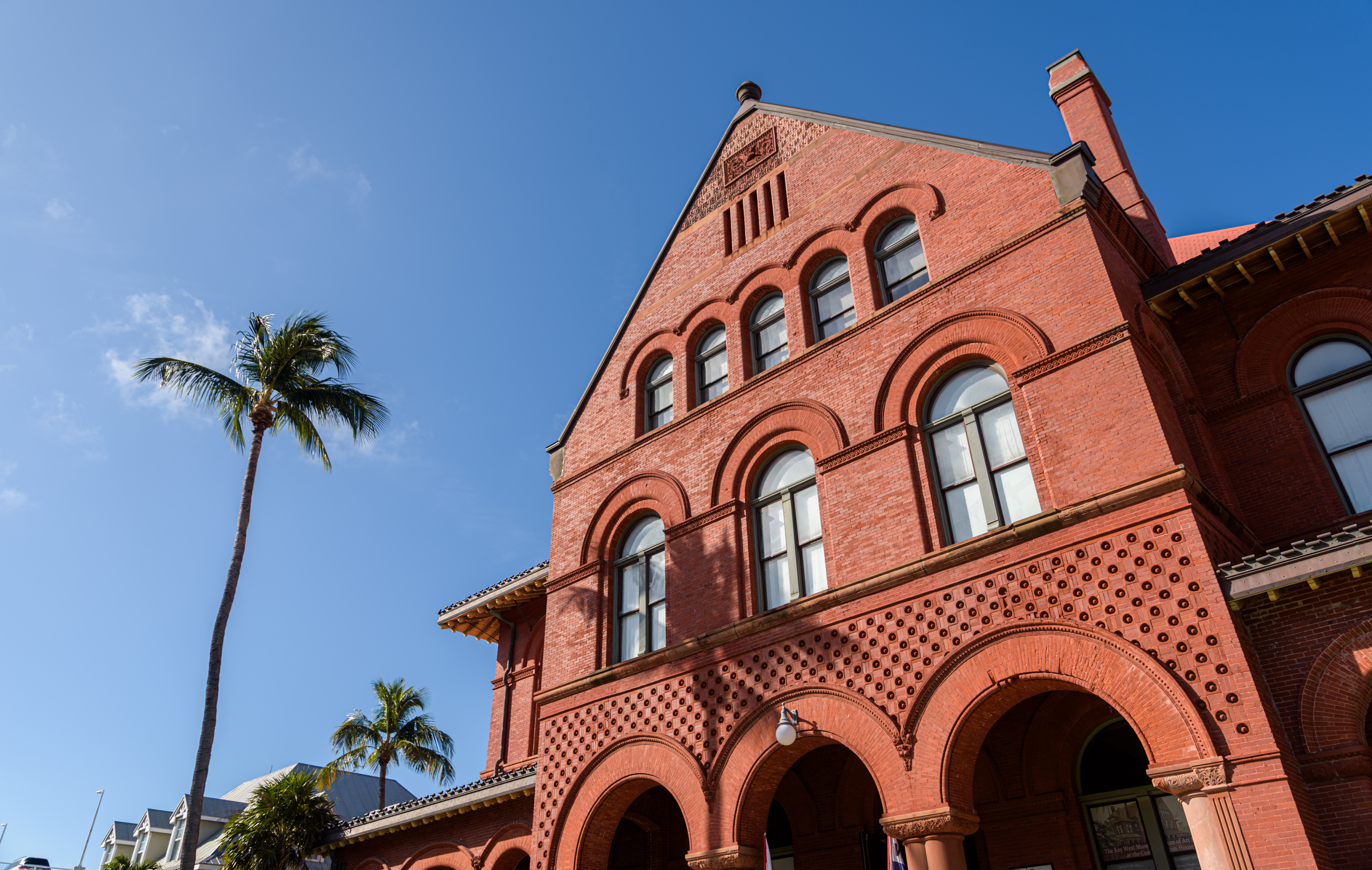
Angular view of eastern façade in 2025

== See also ==
- List of United States post offices
