= Cornelius Hurst =

American businessman (1796–1851)

Cornelius Hurst (1796 – 1851), a native of North Carolina, moved to New Orleans about 1821 and began to build a fortune. He is best known for developing Faubourg Hurstville, which remains now an identifiable section of Uptown New Orleans. Faubourg Hurstville was the first faubourg of what is now Uptown New Orleans, created in 1833 by Cornelius Hurst, a wealthy businessman. He also sold land for the construction of the landmark Lafayette Cemetery No. 1 in New Orleans.

Bankrupted in the Panic of 1837, Hurst lost all his holdings and spent the rest of his life in poverty. His home was moved to another location, and still serves as a private residence.

== Early life ==
Cornelius Hurst was born in Wilmington, North Carolina in October 1796 to Cornelius Hurst Sr. and Sarah Ann Jennett. He moved to New Orleans about 1818, when he married Eleonore Smith a native of Mississippi, and by 1822 he was listed as an agent for the pilot's office there. A decade later, he was listed as a wood merchant, living in Faubourg Lafayette (later, the City of Lafayette) in Jefferson Parish, Louisiana.

== Faubourg Hurstville ==
In 1831, Cornelius Hurst, Julie Robert Avart and Pierre Joseph Tricou purchased part of a sugar plantation in Jefferson Parish that had formerly belonged to Jean Baptiste Francois LeBreton. They immediately divided the purchase into three equal parts. Tricou sold his portion to Hurst in the following year. In 1832, Hurst commissioned Benjamin Buisson to subdivide most of his holdings into residential lots that Hurst named Faubourg Hurstville. It ran along the Mississippi River from Joseph Street to "the Bloomingdale Line" between Eleonore Street and State Street, continuing inland to Claiborne Avenue. Hurst named three streets in the faubourg for family members. Eleonore Street for his wife, Arabella for a daughter and Joseph for a son. A cross street was named Hurst. The fourth street was named Nashville, as part of a plan to induce the New Orleans & Nashville Railroad to extend a line down the middle of it to the Mississippi River. However, both Hurst and the railroad went bankrupt during the Panic of 1837, and the proposed track was not built.

In 1833, sold part of his plantation to the City of Lafayette, then a suburb of New Orleans in Jefferson Parish, for construction of a cemetery. This cemetery, later named Lafayette Cemetery No. 1, was the first in the New Orleans area where people who were not Catholics could be buried. The cemetery remains today, even though the City of Lafayette disappeared following its annexation by New Orleans in 1870.

== Death ==
Heavily in debt, Hurst lost all his property to his creditors. He lived in poverty for the rest of his life, apparently supported by his sons-in-law. Hurst died of cholera on April 28, 1851. He was buried in Metairie Cemetery, in the family tomb of Samuel Dean Moody. Hurst's daughter, Gabriella, had married Moody. (Note: Gabriella (1838 - 1928) was born after Hurst lost control of all his property, so her name does not appear among the streets of the faubourg.) The tomb also contains the remains of several others in Cornelius' family. According to Hemard, Hurst's wife died November 15, 1844, after a long illness. Hernard also states that she was a native of Pennsylvania. Eleanor's name does not appear on the Moody tomb, and her burial site is not known. (Note: Ironically, although Hurst's wife's name was spelled Eleanor on her obituary, the signs on the street named for her are spelled differently.)

The fine house that was built for the Hurst family at the corner of Tchopitoulas and Joseph Streets was sold to another family in the bankruptcy sale. Many years later, another owner had the house moved to a lot overlooking the New Orleans Golf Course. It still serves as a private residence today.

While the name Hurstville is still used (usually in real-estate ads), the memory of its developer is largely forgotten.
