= James Freret =

American architect

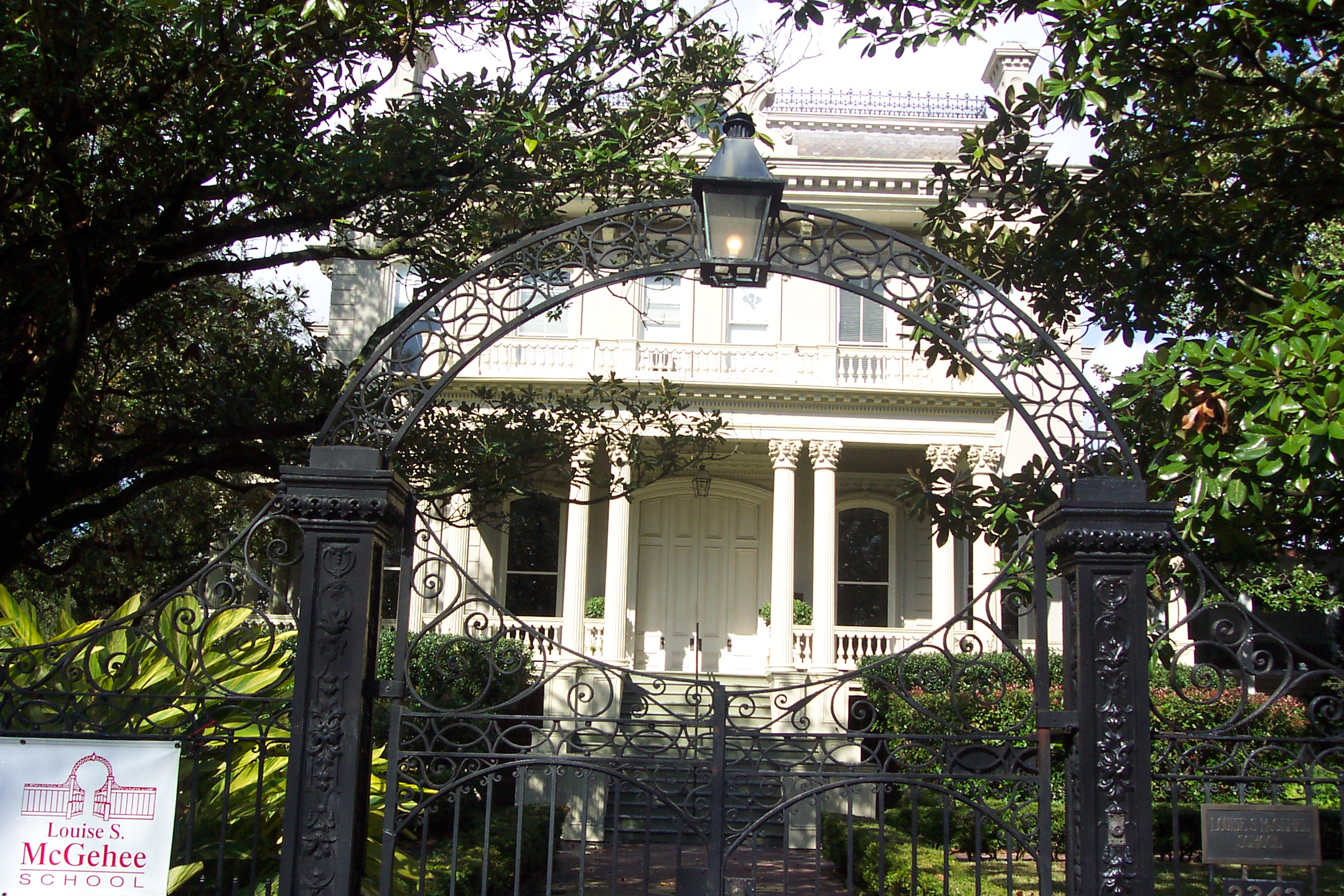
McGehee School

James Freret (1838–1897) was an American architect who practiced in New Orleans, Louisiana. He was prolific in designing many homes in that area.

== Biography ==
Freret was born in New Orleans, Louisiana to Livie (née D'Arensbourg) Freret and James P. Freret. His cousin William A. Freret, also an architect, and son of New Orleans mayor William Freret, redesigned the State capitol after the Civil War and headed the Office of the Supervising Architect in Washington, D.C.

He studied in the office of New Orleans architect George Purves early in his career. Freret went on to study architecture at the École des Beaux-Arts in the early 1860s in the atelier of Charles-Auguste Questel, one of the first Americans to study at the Ecole. He returned to the United States due to the Civil War, joining the Confederate Army's engineering corps. He was wounded in the Siege of Port Hudson, and in 1865 returned to New Orleans to open his own architecture practice.

== Select works ==
- Moresque Building, New Orleans (with William A. Freret) destroyed by fire in 1897.
- Board of Trade building, New Orleans
- Lemann Store, 314 Mississippi Street, Donaldsonville, Louisiana, NRHP-listed
- Administration Building of the Spring Hill College Quadrangle, 4307 Old Shell Road, Mobile, Alabama, NRHP-listed
- Upper Central Business District (Boundary Increase II) one or more works, roughly bounded by O'Keefe, Poydras, Convention Center Blvd., St. Rt. 90 and Howard Avenue, New Orleans (Freret and Wolf), NRHP-listed
- Bradish Johnson House, 2341 Prytania Street, erected in 1872. Residence of Walter Denegre 1892-1929, Louise S. McGehee School since 1929.
- Little Sisters of the Poor, Convent of St. Mary (1886) corner of Prytania and Foucher Streets, New Orleans, Louisiana
- Gothic Revival Masonic Hall (1867-1871) also known as “New Masonic Hall”, designed for Tivoli Circle, New Orleans, Louisiana but never built.
- Jewish Widows and Orphans Home (1868) New Orleans, Louisiana
