= William Alfred Freret =

American architect

William Freret
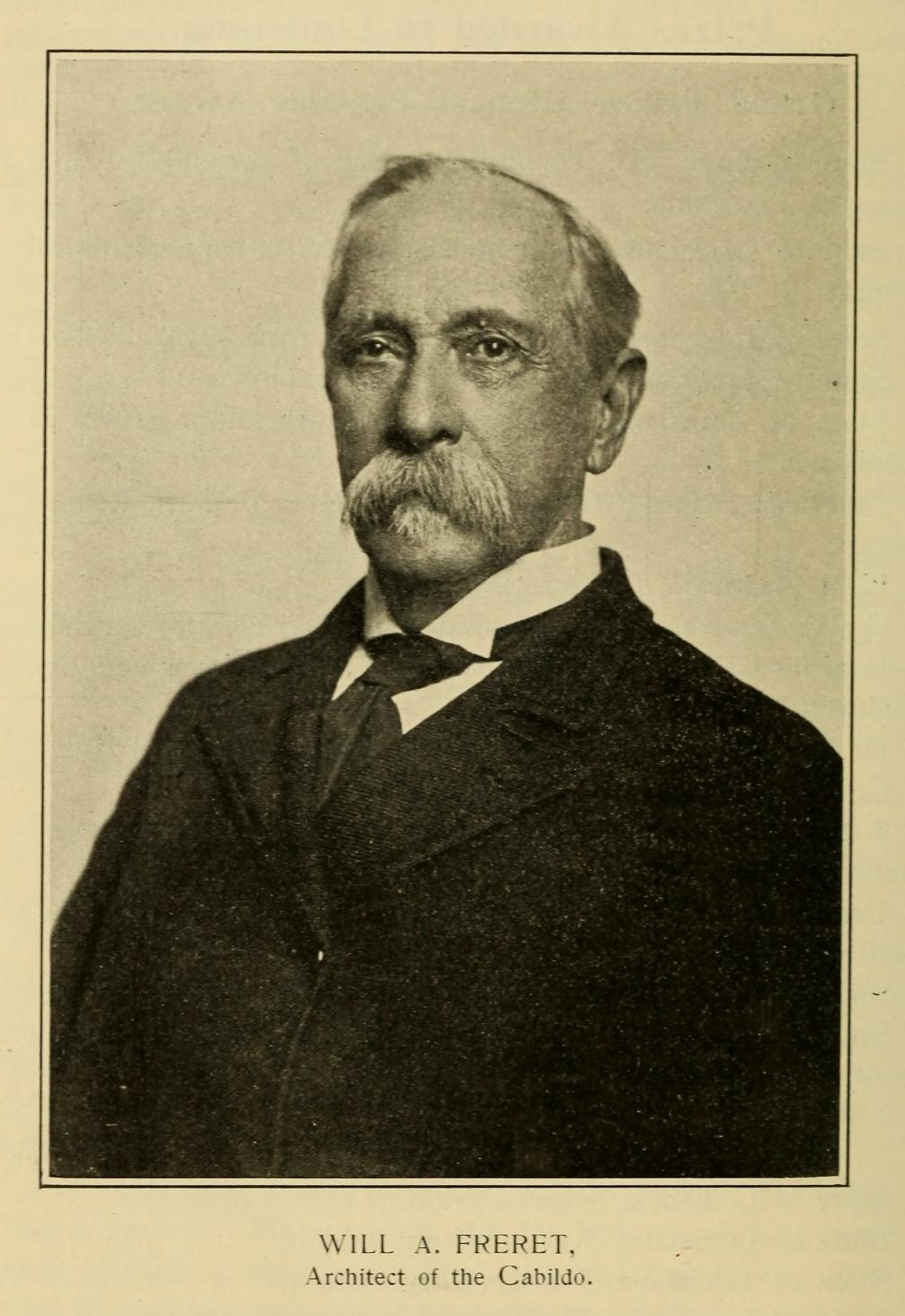
- Born: January 19, 1833; New Orleans, Louisiana
- Died: December 5, 1911 (aged 78); New Orleans, Louisiana
- Occupation: Architect
- Spouse: Caroline Lewis
- Children: 3
- Buildings: Old Louisiana State Capitol

William Alfred Freret Jr. (January 19, 1833 - December 5, 1911) was an American architect. He served from 1887 to 1888 as head of the Office of the Supervising Architect, which oversaw construction of Federal buildings.

He is associated with a number of buildings that are listed on the U.S. National Register of Historic Places.

== Biography ==
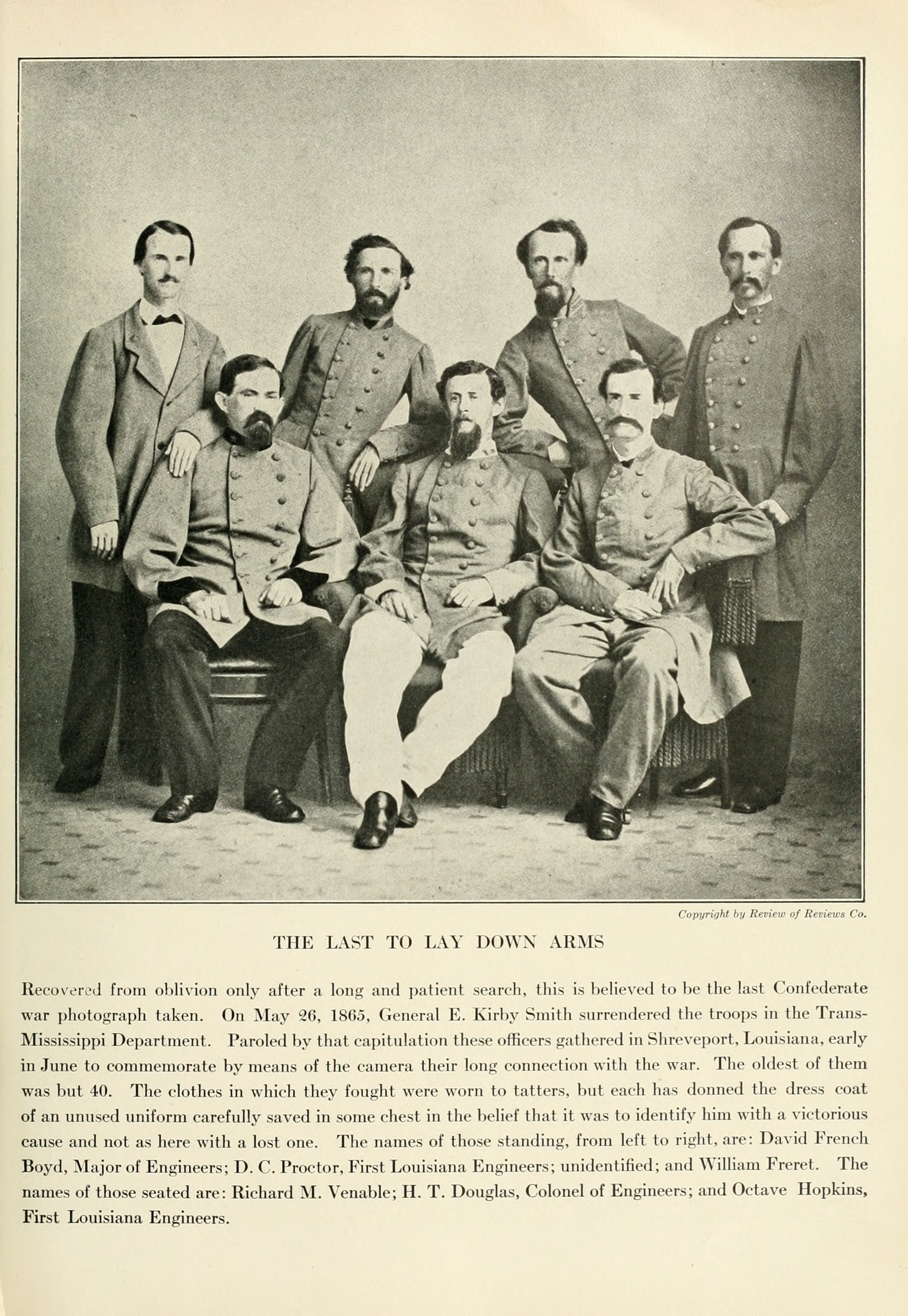
June 1865 William A. Freret stands in back row far right

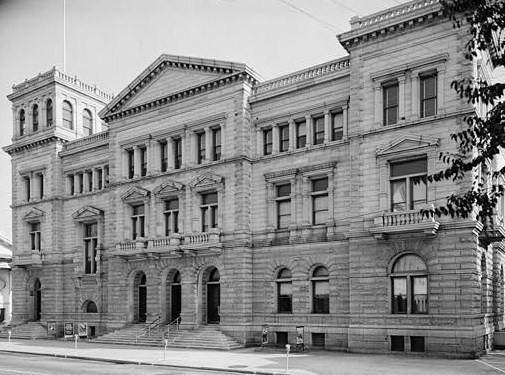
U.S. Post Office and Courthouse (Charleston, South Carolina)

William Alfred Freret was born in New Orleans. His father was William Freret, a mayor of the city, and his cousin James Freret was a fellow architect with whom he sometimes collaborated. He was educated in his native city and in Baton Rouge.

William received an engineering degree in England and adopted architecture as his profession. At the outbreak of the American Civil War, he entered the Confederate Army as a private in the Washington Artillery from New Orleans. He was promoted from time to time, finally reaching the rank of lieutenant-colonel of engineers. He served on Kirby Smith's staff, and was also assistant chief and acting chief of the Trans-Mississippi Department until the surrender. From 1866 to 1868, Freret was a state engineer for Louisiana, and for several years after that he had charge of the construction of the public schools of the McDonogh fund, some sixteen in number. He served as supervising architect of the U.S. government from June 1887, until March 1890, when he resigned.

W. A. Freret designed the reconstructed statehouse at Baton Rouge after the Civil War. He was the architect for the buildings of the state university at Pineville, the University of Alabama at Tuscaloosa, and many of the public buildings and private residences in New Orleans and elsewhere in Louisiana and several of the neighboring states.

== Projects ==
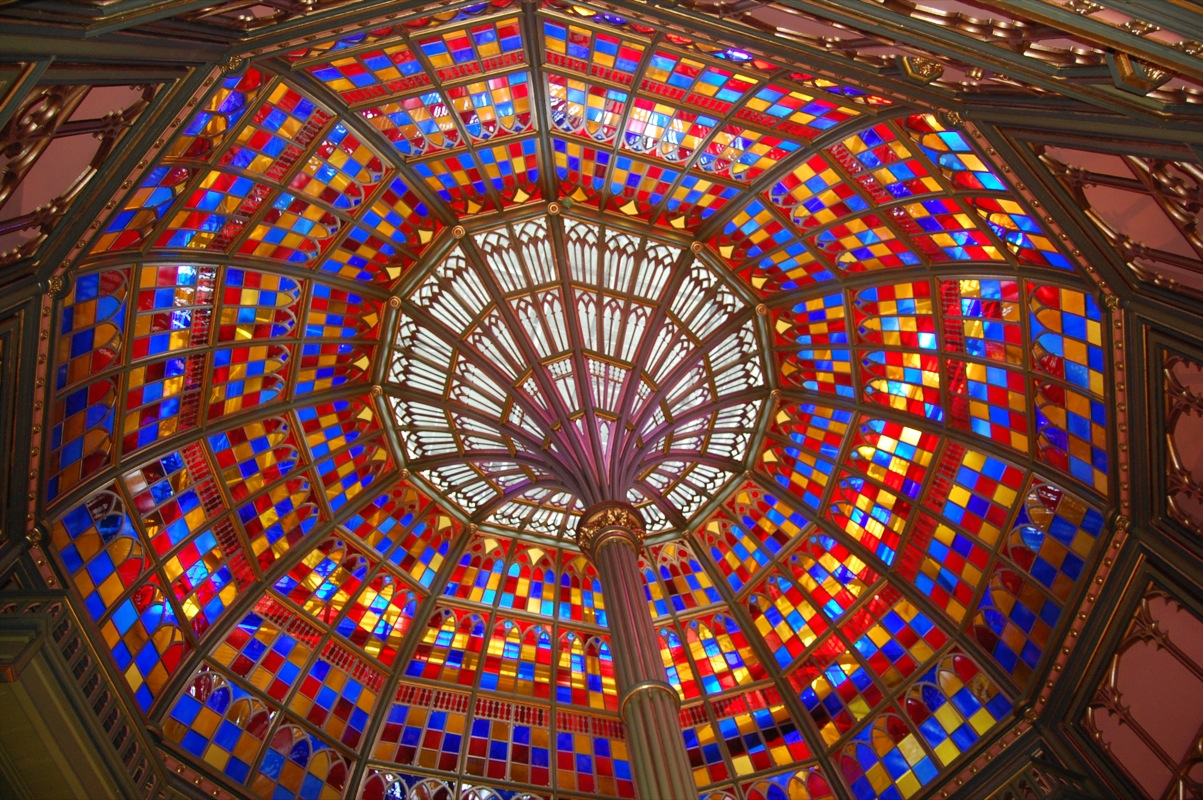
Freret's glass dome in the Old Louisiana State Capitol

Works include:

- Old Louisiana State Capitol, North Blvd. and St. Philip St. Baton Rouge, Louisiana, built 1847-50, NRHP-listed After James H. Dakin's Gothic Revival building burned during the American Civil War, Freret was in charge of its reconstruction in 1882, adding notable features like a spiral staircase and the stained-glass dome.
- U.S. Courthouse and Post Office, 201 W. Commerce St. Aberdeen, Mississippi, NRHP-listed
- U.S. Courthouse and Post Office, 301 S. Center St., Statesville, North Carolina (now City Hall)
- U.S. Courthouse, Custom House and Post Office, 281 Front Street Key West, Florida (now Key West Museum of Art & History)
- U.S. Post Office, W. 4th St. between Government Pl. and West St. Williamsport, Pennsylvania Freret, William A.), NRHP-listed
- U.S. Post Office and Courthouse, 83 Broad St. Charleston, South Carolina, NRHP-listed
- United States Post Office in Charlotte, North Carolina; a red brick Romanesque Revival building with corner towers, no longer existing
- United States Post Office and Courthouse in Wilmington, North Carolina; brownstone Romanesque Revival which per its NRHP nomination was "especially imposing" with a tall corner tower and a "dramatic roofline", no longer existing

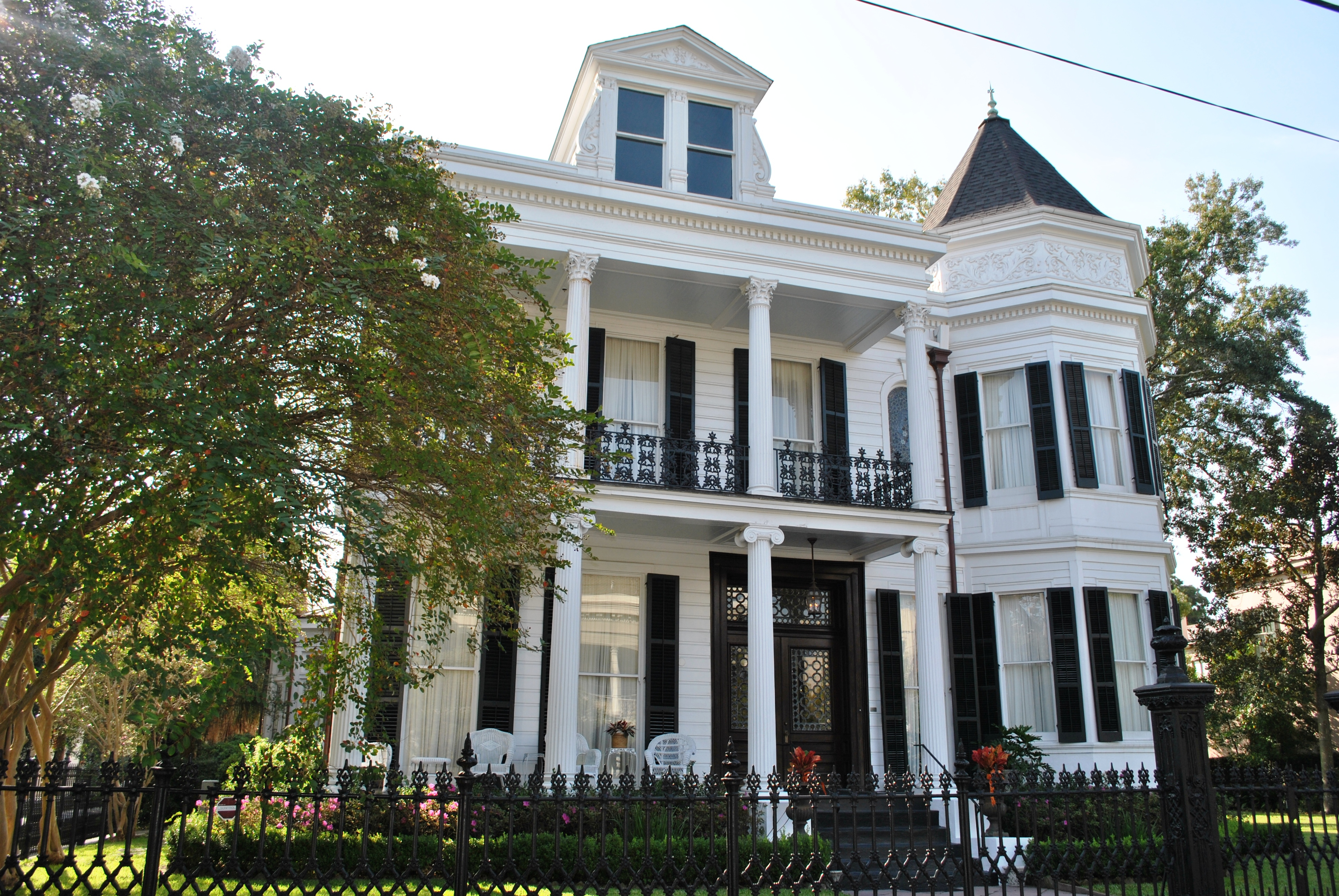
Women's Guild of the New Orleans Opera Association

- Women's Guild of the New Orleans Opera Association, 2500 Prytania Street, Greek Revival, built for Edward A. Davis in 1859. Dr. and Mrs. Herman de Bachelle Seebold purchased the home in 1944 and donated the mansion, furnishings and art in 1965 to the Women's Guild of the New Orleans Opera Association. (Marker by Women's Guild of the New Orleans Opera Association)
- The Manse, 2328 Coliseum Street, erected in 1859 for Hannah Killingley Walford, widow of Edmund W. Briggs, agent for London Unity Insurance Company. Purchased in 1871 by the Prytania Street Presbyterian Church for use as the minister's residence. The bay containing the minister's study was added at that time. The last minister to live here was the Rev. Dr. William McFadden Alexander. His widow, Ceneilla Bower Alexander, artist noted for designing Rex Carnival parade floats, purchased the house from the church in 1947. (Marker by New Orleans Landmarks Commission, 2001)

== Notes ==
Preceded by Mifflin E. Bell	Office of the Supervising Architect; 1887–1888	Succeeded by James H. Windrim
