= Church Street East Historic District =

Historic district in Alabama, United States

- U.S. National Register of Historic Places
- U.S. Historic district
- Location within Mobile, Alabama Location within Alabama Location within the United States
- Location: Mobile, Alabama
- Coordinates: 30°41′9.91″N 88°2′52.80″W
- Architectural style: Federal, Greek Revival, Renaissance Revival, Italianate, and others
- NRHP reference No.: 71000102 (original); 84000663 (increase 1); 05000289 (increase 2)

Significant dates
- Added to NRHP: 16 December 1971
- Boundary increases: January 13, 1984; April 20, 2005

The Church Street East Historic District is a historic district in the city of Mobile, Alabama, United States. It was placed on the National Register of Historic Places on 16 December 1971. Since a boundary increase on 13 January 1984, it is roughly bounded by Broad, Conti, Water, Claiborne, and Canal Streets. 20 April 2005 saw the further addition of 66 & 68 Royal Street to the district. The district covers 1,403 acres (5.68 km^{2}) and contains 83 contributing buildings and one object. It contains portions of Mobile's 19th century downtown area and features government, museum, commercial, and residential structures in a variety of 19th-century styles. The buildings range in age from the 1820s to 1900 and include the Federal, Greek Revival, Renaissance Revival, Italianate, and various other Victorian architectural styles. Notable buildings include the Government Street Presbyterian Church, Barton Academy, and the Ketchum House.

== Gallery ==
Examples of architecture found within the Church Street East Historic District:

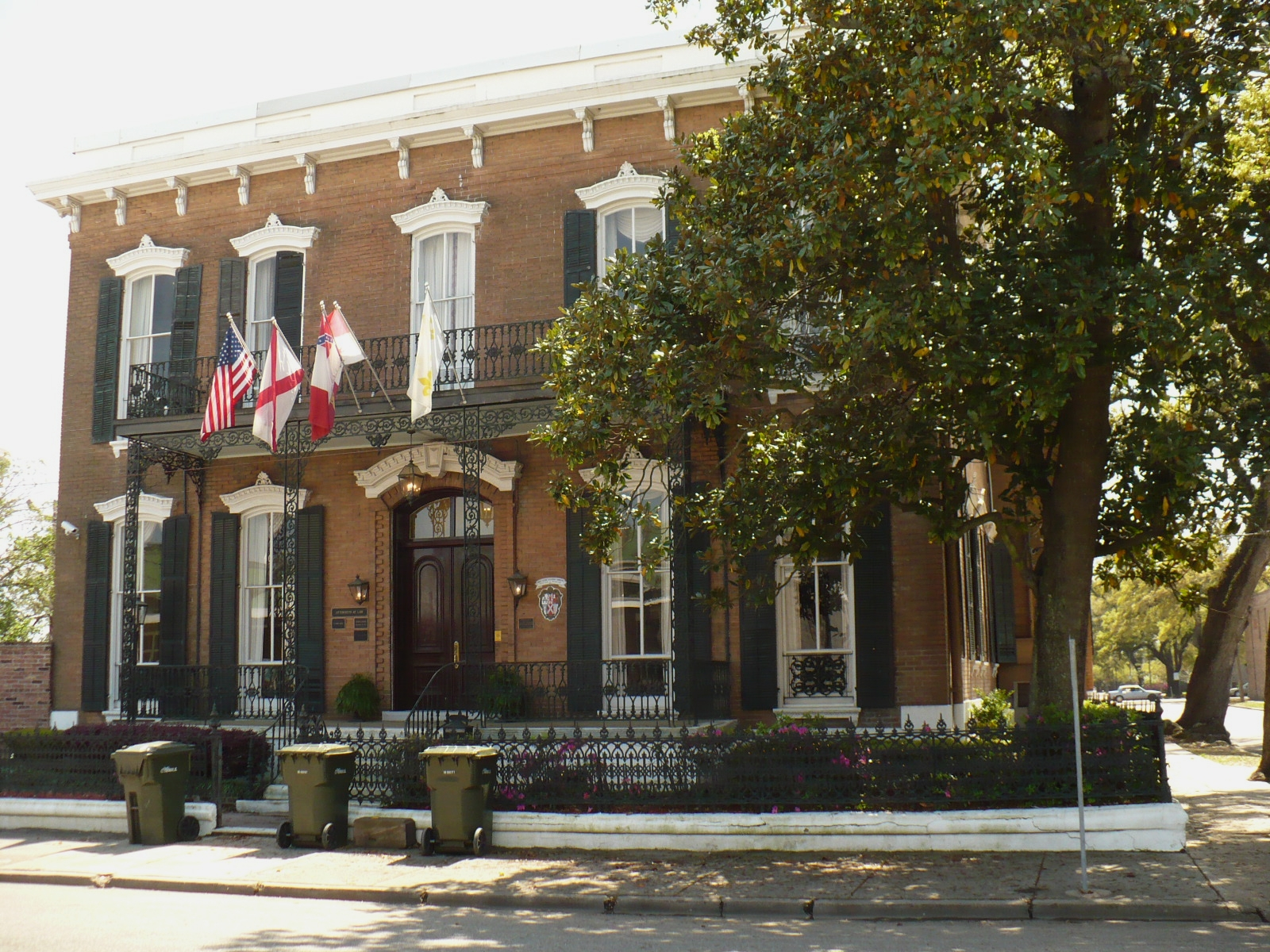
The Martin Horst House on Conti Street.

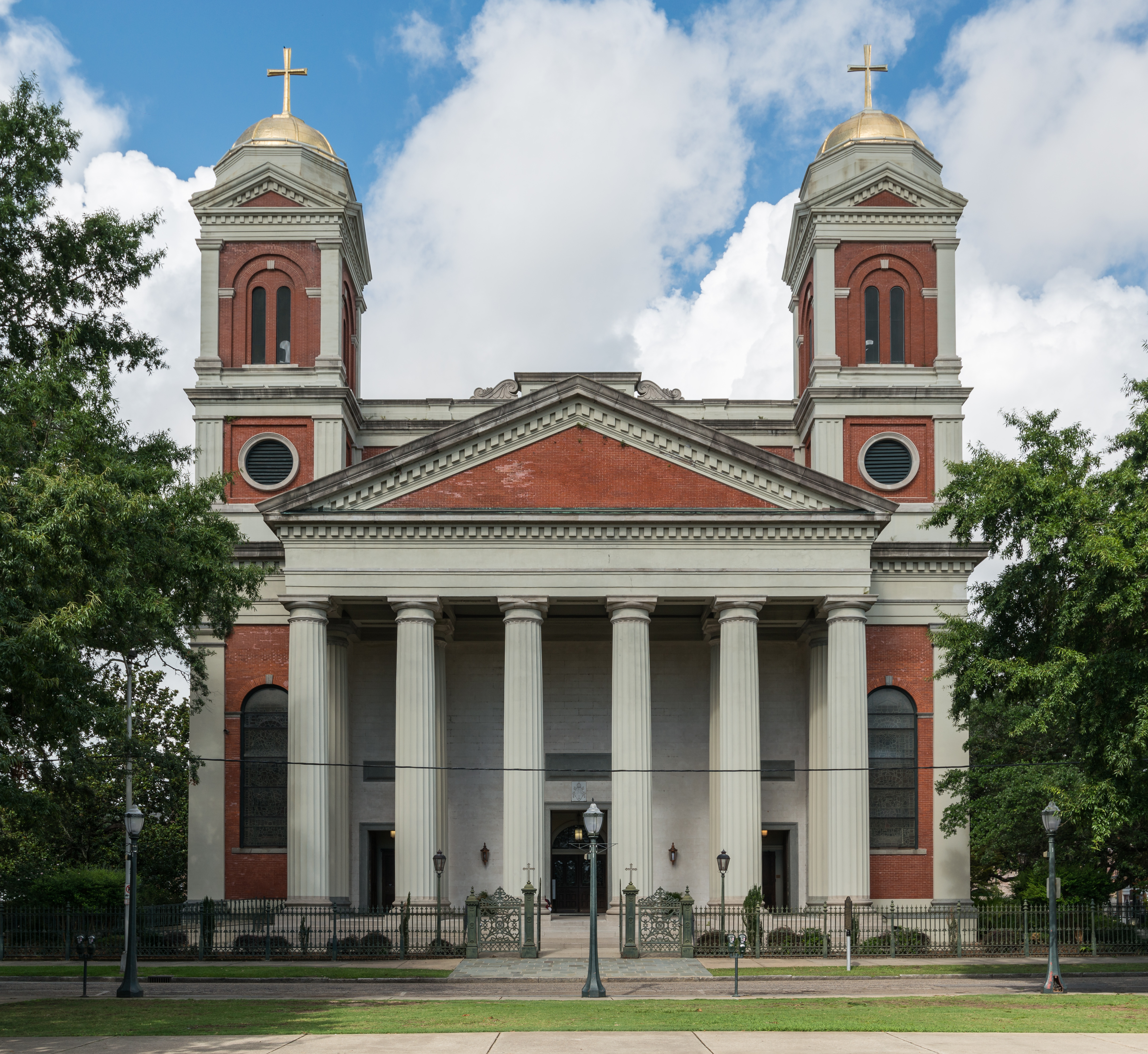
Cathedral Basilica of the Immaculate Conception

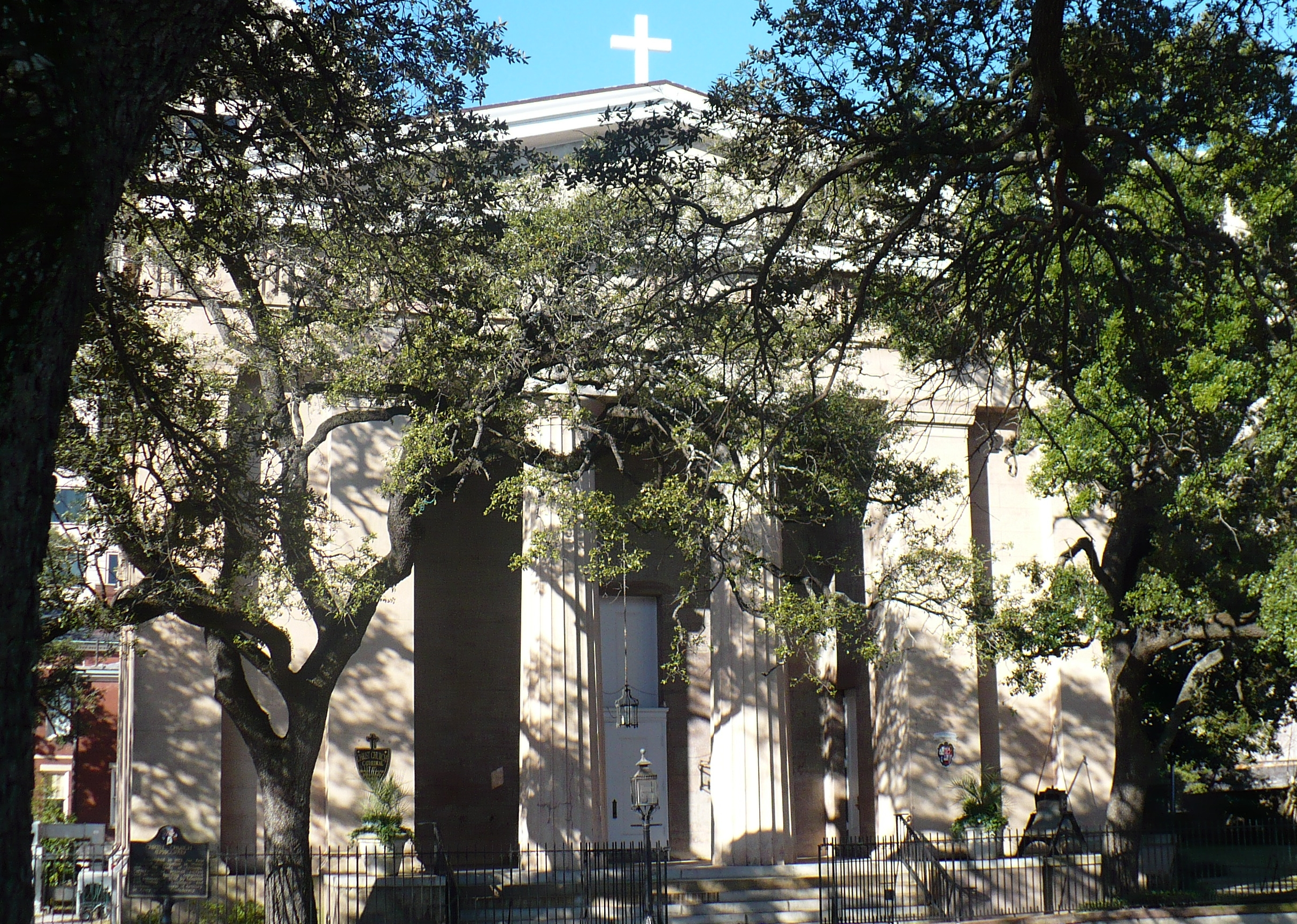
Christ Church Cathedral.

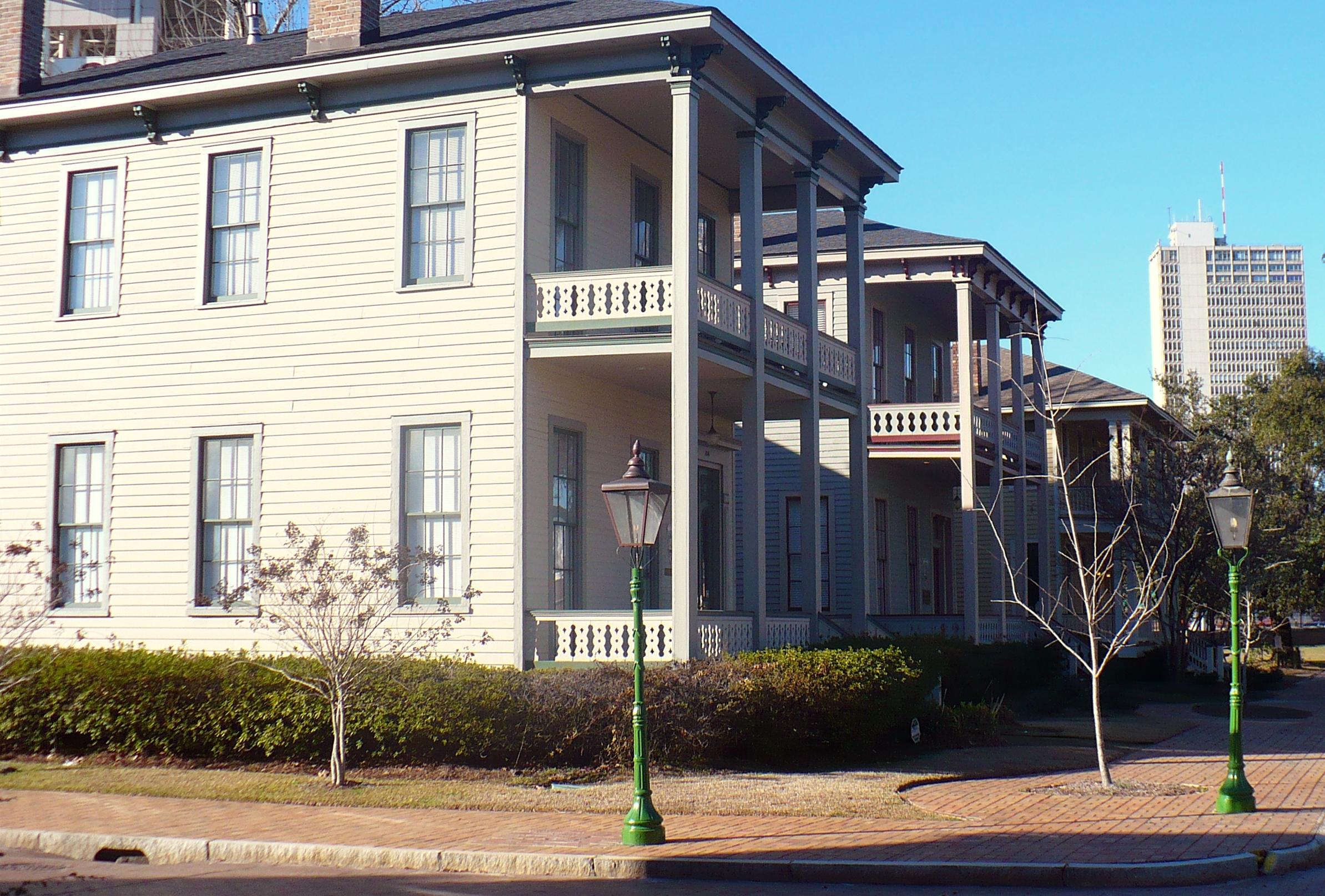
Houses on St. Emanuel Street.

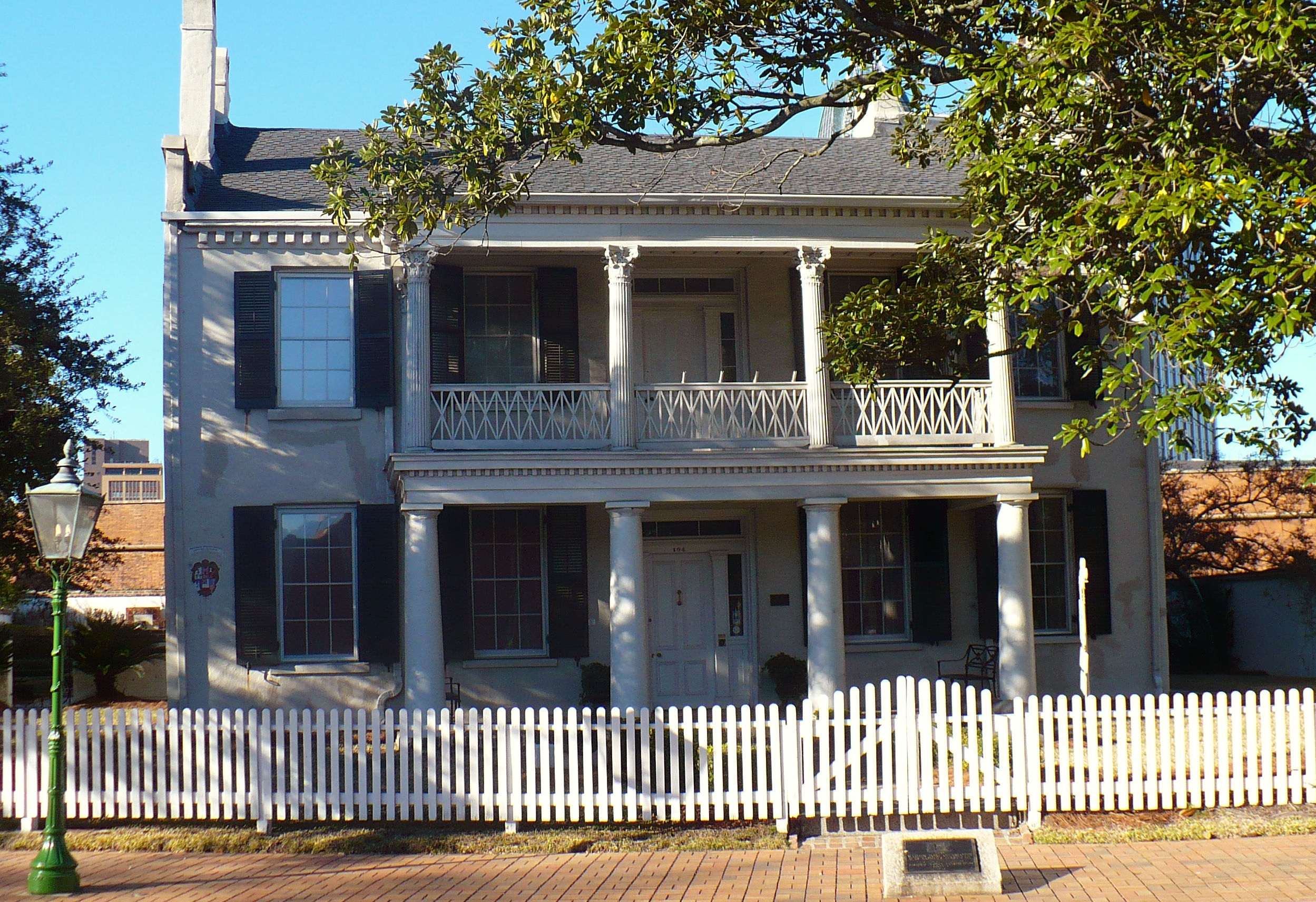
The Conde-Charlotte House on Theatre Street.

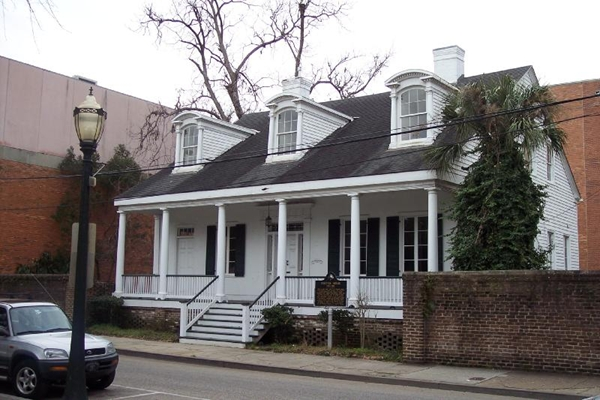
The Bishop Portier House on Conti Street.

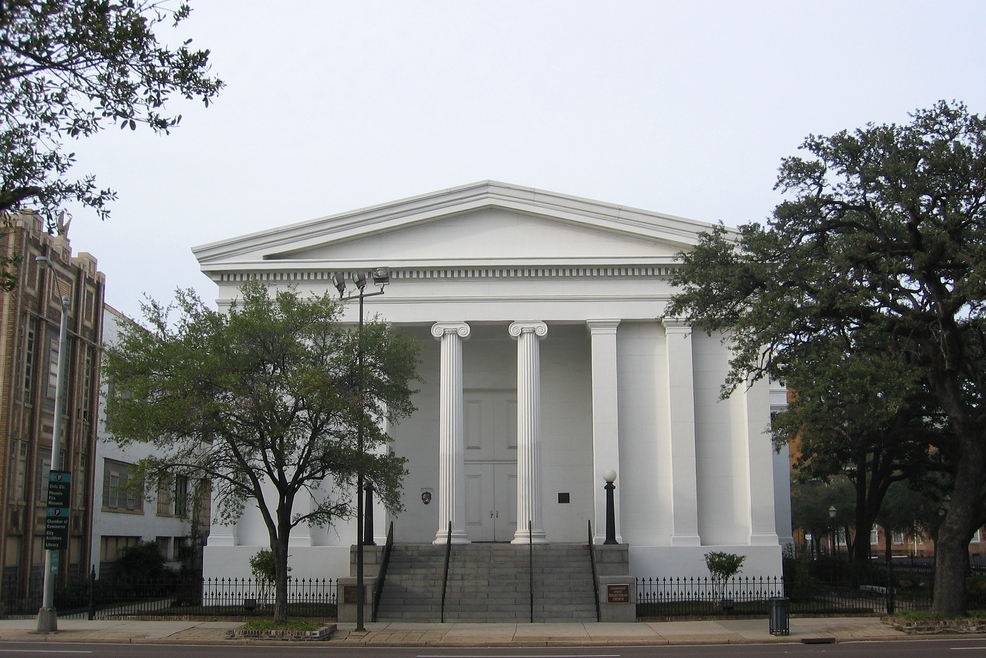
Government Street Presbyterian Church.

== See also ==
- Mobile Public Library
- Kennedy House (Mobile, Alabama)
