= Government Street (Mobile, Alabama) =

Street in Mobile, Alabama, United States

Government Street/Government Boulevard
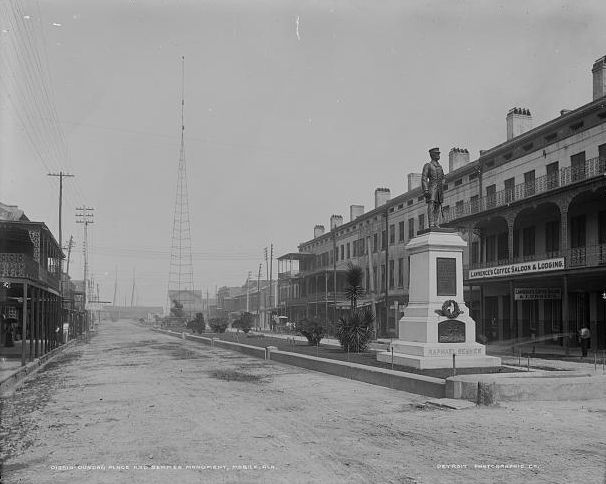
- Historic view near the eastern end of Government Street, between Water and Royal Streets, circa 1900. This is the Raphael Semmes Statue. (1900-2020)
- Interactive map of Government Street/Government Boulevard
- Maintained by: City of Mobile
- Location: Mobile, Alabama
- East end: 30.6932°N 88.0301°W
- West end: 30.5283°N 88.1970°W

Government Street is the name given to portions of U.S. Route 90 (US 90) and US 98 within the city limits of Mobile, Alabama. It is known as Government Boulevard west of Pinehill Drive, and as Government Street east of it. It is the most important road on Mobile's far south side and is the only nominally east–west road on Mobile's south side to enter the city from outside the western city limits and reach the downtown business district. The only other two east–west thoroughfares in the city to do so are Moffett Road/Springhill Avenue and Old Shell Road. Government Street is a four-lane highway throughout the city limits, from Water Street to the western city limits. It is the only thoroughfare in Mobile to have interchanges with both Interstate 10 (I-10) (exit 27)and I-65 (exit 1) within the city limits.

== Route description ==
Government Street begins at the intersection with the Old Spanish Trail on Blakeley Island, east of where it emerges from the Bankhead Tunnel. It expands after crossing Royal Street. US 98 leaves the route at Broad Street, with the remainder of Government Street continuing as US 90. It continues onward for approximately 3.6 miles (5.8 km) to Pinehill Drive, where it becomes Government Boulevard. It then continues for approximately 10 miles (16 km) until it ends at the southwesternmost limits of the city, in Theodore. This area, along with the Tillmans Corner business district, was annexed into the city in September 2008.

== History ==
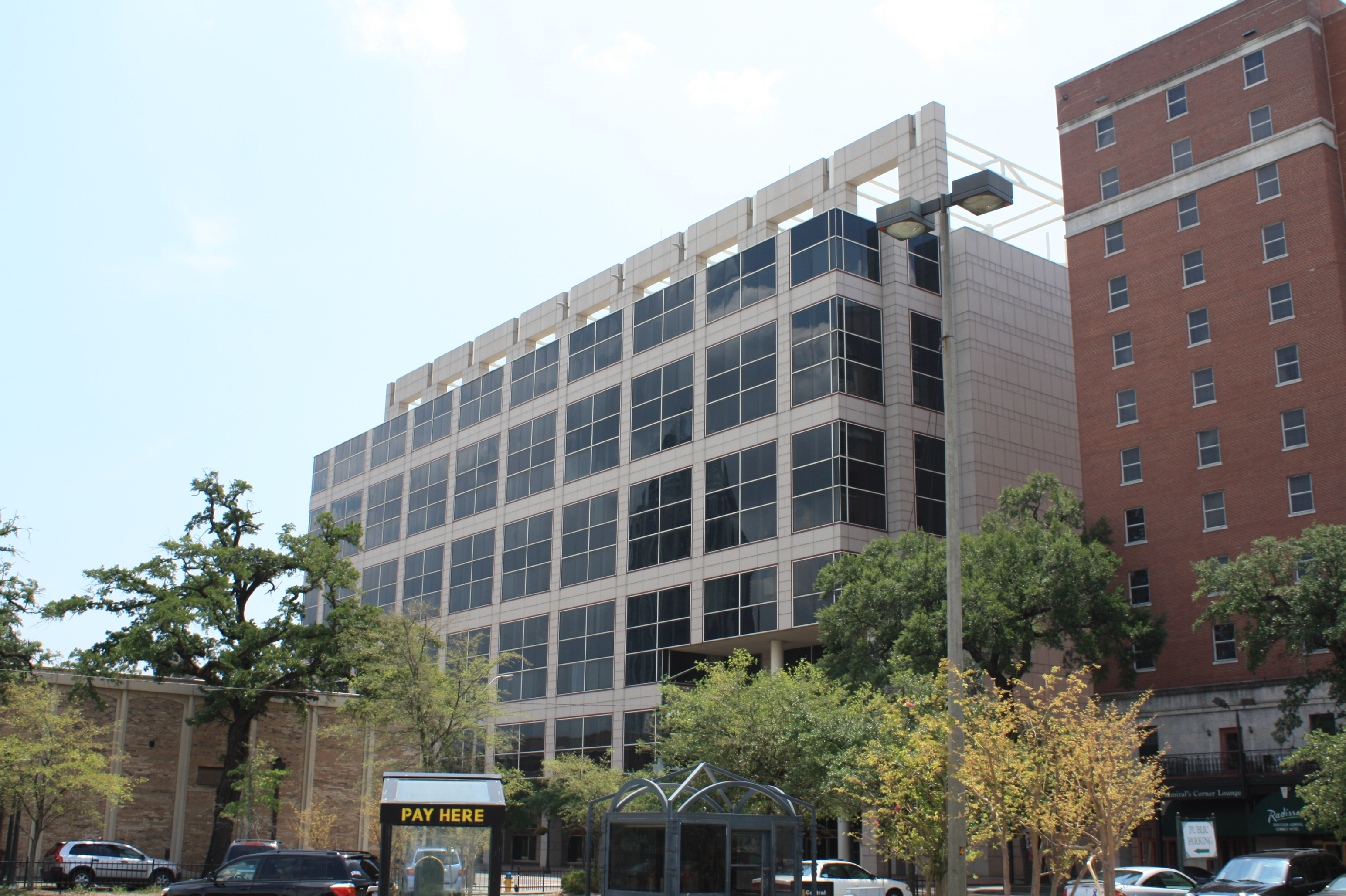
Mobile Government Plaza, seat of government for the city of Mobile and Mobile County. Viewed from the corner of Government and South Jackson streets.

The street was laid out and named after the close of Mobile's colonial era, following the demolition of the obsolete Fort Conde. In the early 1820s the marshlands between the Mobile River and Royal Street were filled in with the bricks and other material from the demolished fort. Government Street was run westward from the old esplanade that had been situated beside the river and fort. It has traditionally been a street where Mobile's government-related functions were concentrated. Barton Academy, Old City Hall, the Mobile County License Commissioner Offices, Mobile Government Plaza, the Mobile Public Library, Mobile Bar Association, and Social Security Administration all continue to lie along Government Street.

Government had a reputation as the "mansion or millionaire's row" in the city, although many of the largest and grandest of the 19th-century mansions once lining the street were demolished as late as the 1980s. The area east of Houston Street still has many 19th- to early 20th-century mansions that date back to the time when Government was the most prestigious address that one could have in Mobile.

Historic Government Street architecture
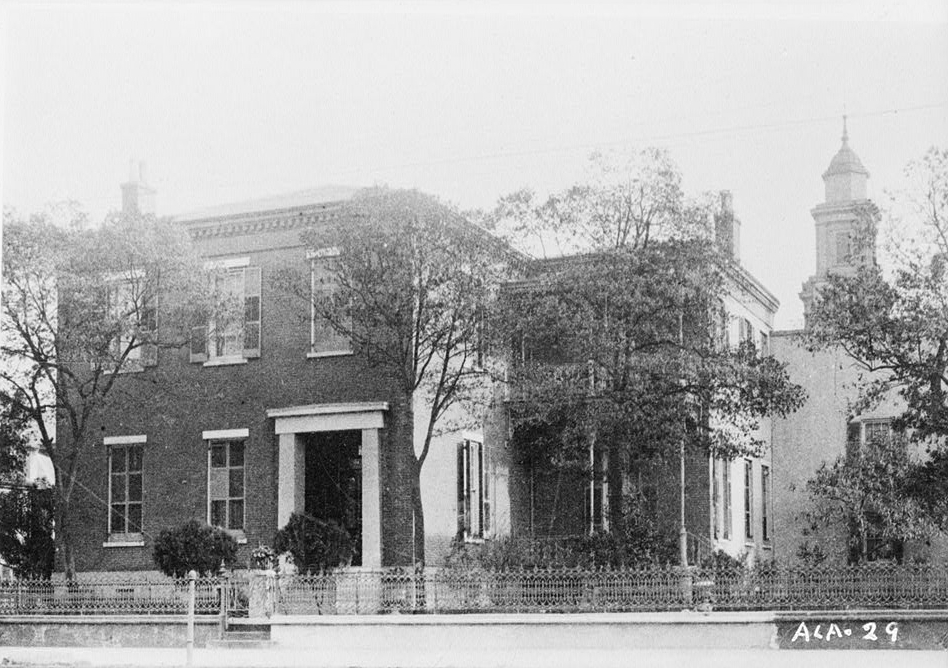
Le Vert House at 151–153 Government, built from 1827–47 and now demolished. Home of Madame Octavia Walton Le Vert, a noted antebellum socialite and author.

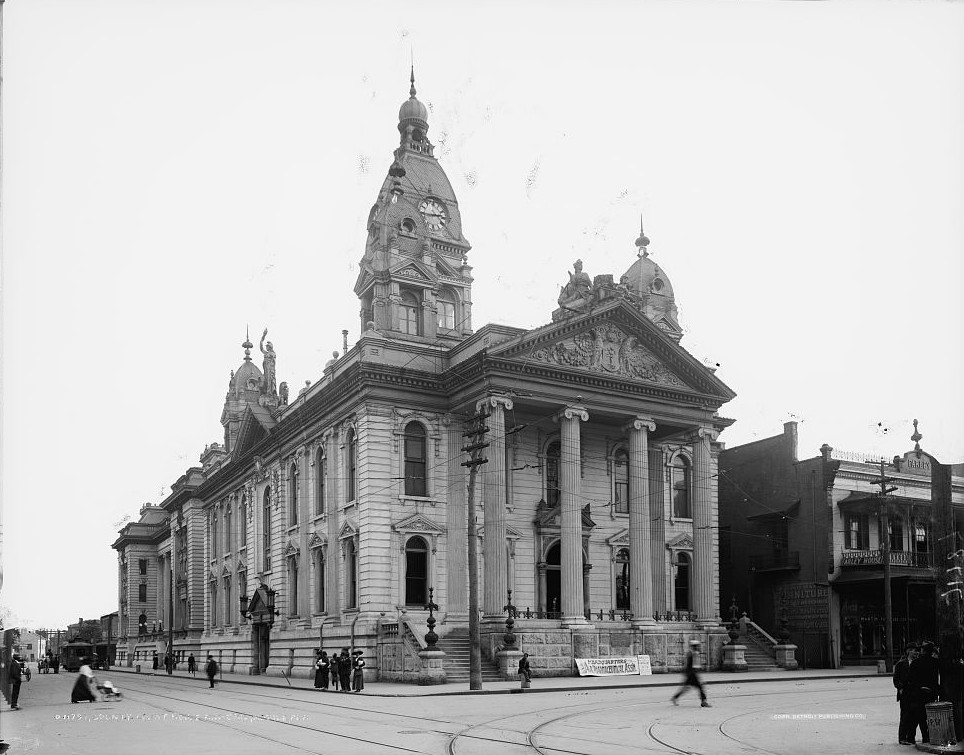
Rudolph Benz-designed Mobile County Courthouse, built in 1889 and demolished in the 1950s.

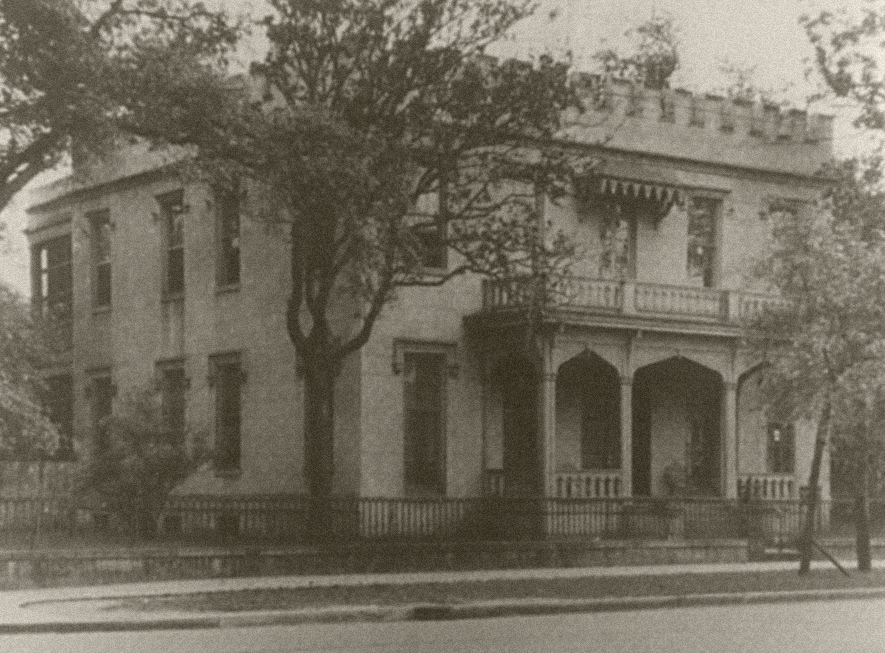
Murray Forbes Smith House at 201, now demolished. Childhood home of Alva Smith Vanderbilt, noted socialite.

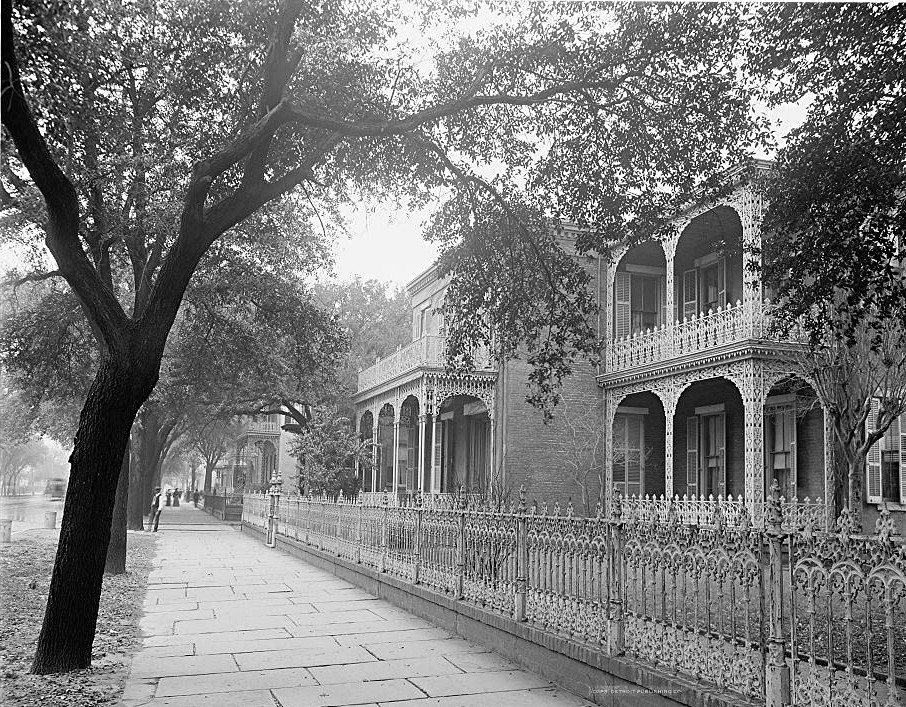
Residential scene along Government in 1906.

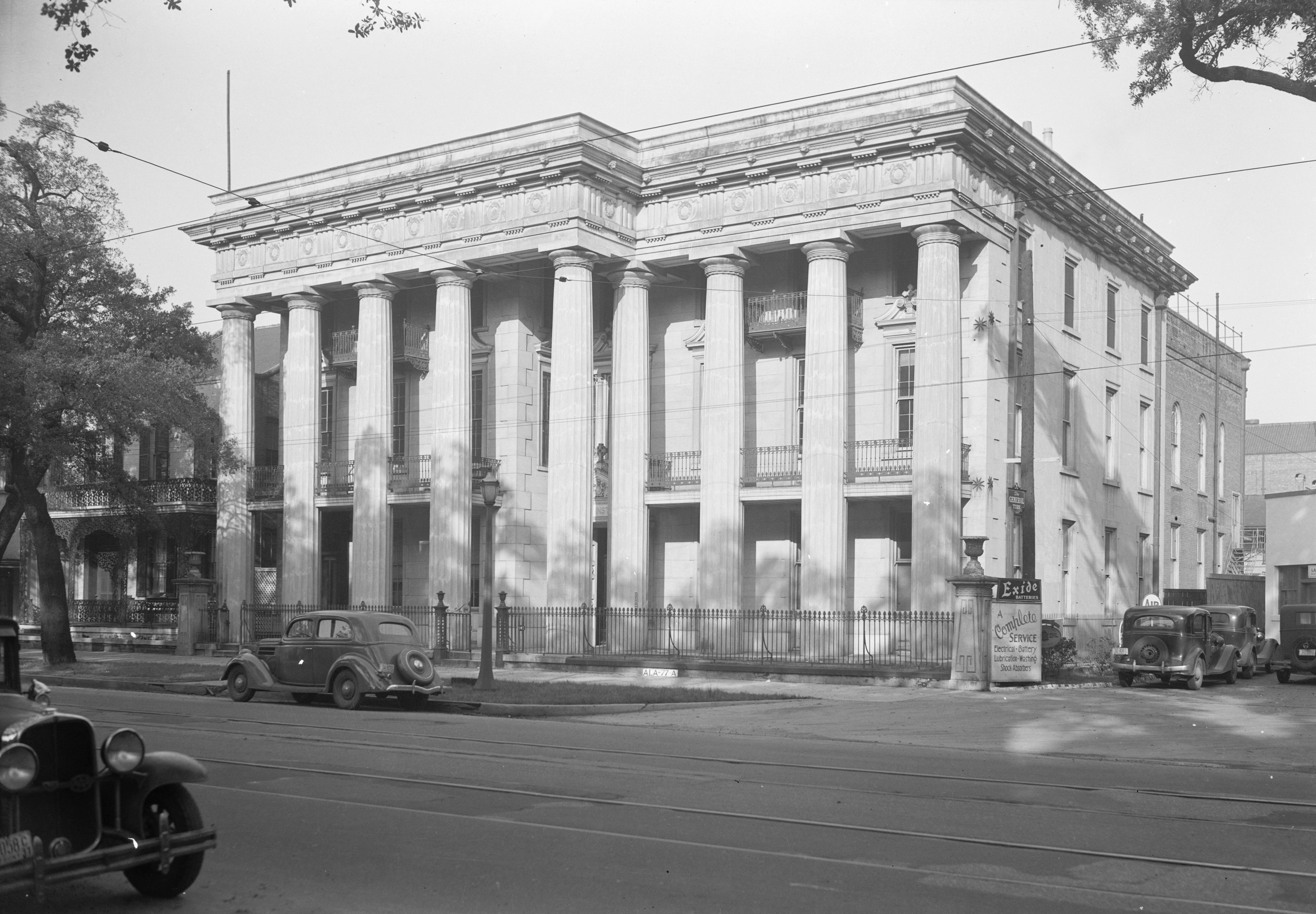
William G. Chandler Mansion (later the McGill Institute) at 252, now demolished. Childhood home of Florence Chandler Maybrick, noted murderer.

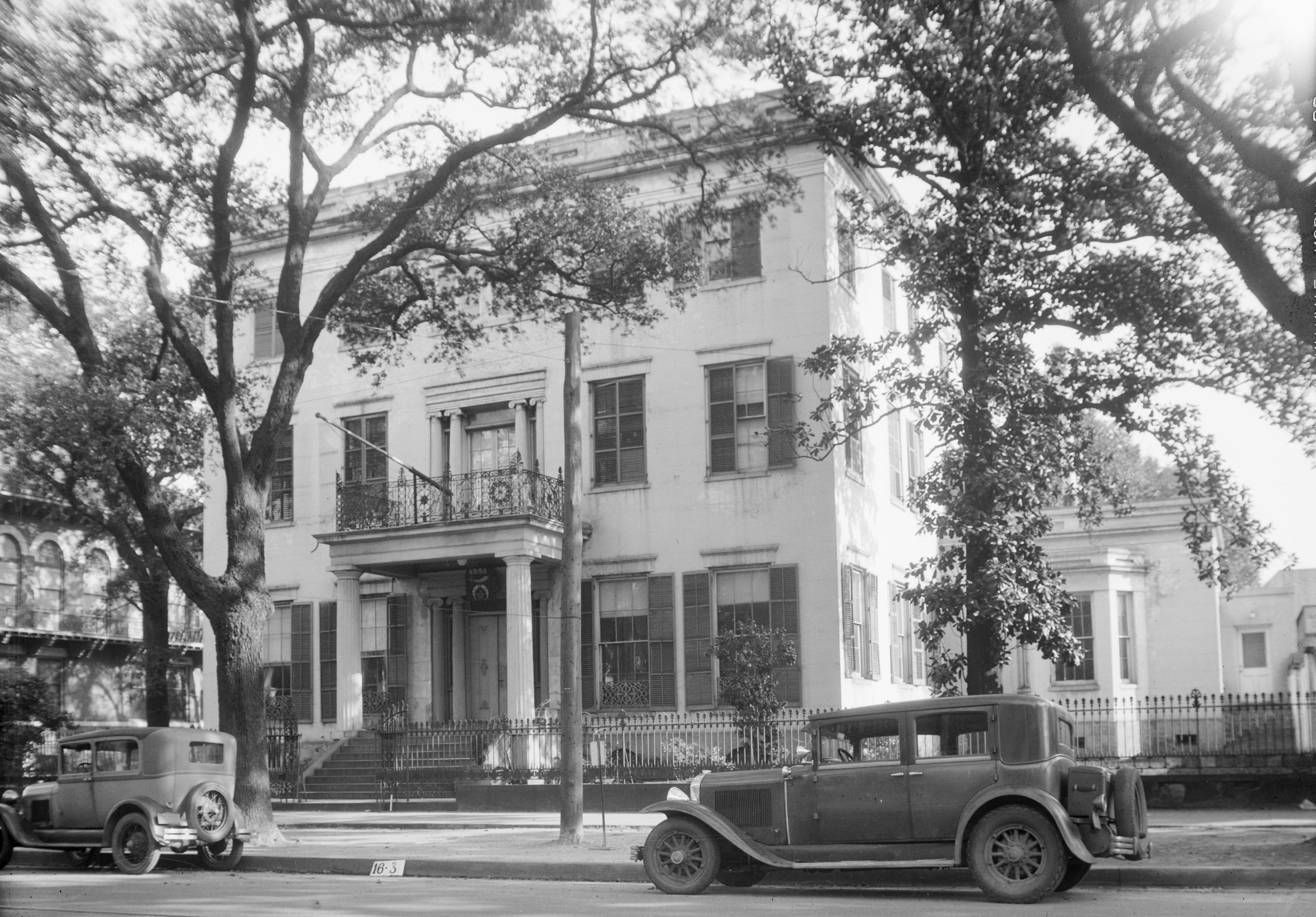
Jonathan Emanuel Mansion at 251, now demolished.

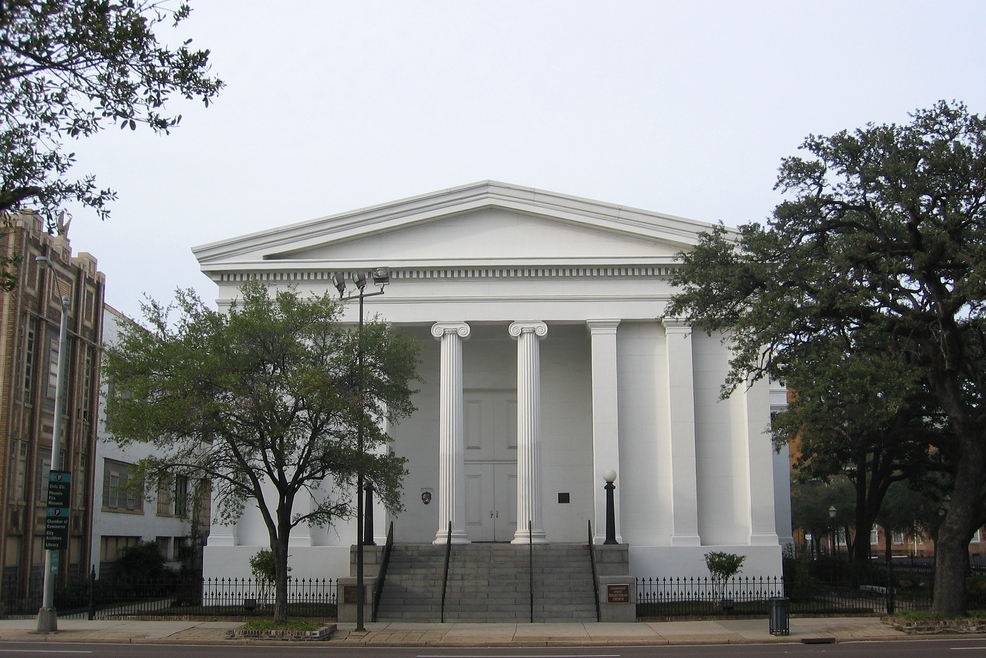
Government Street Presbyterian Church at 300, built in 1836. It is designated as a National Historic Landmark.

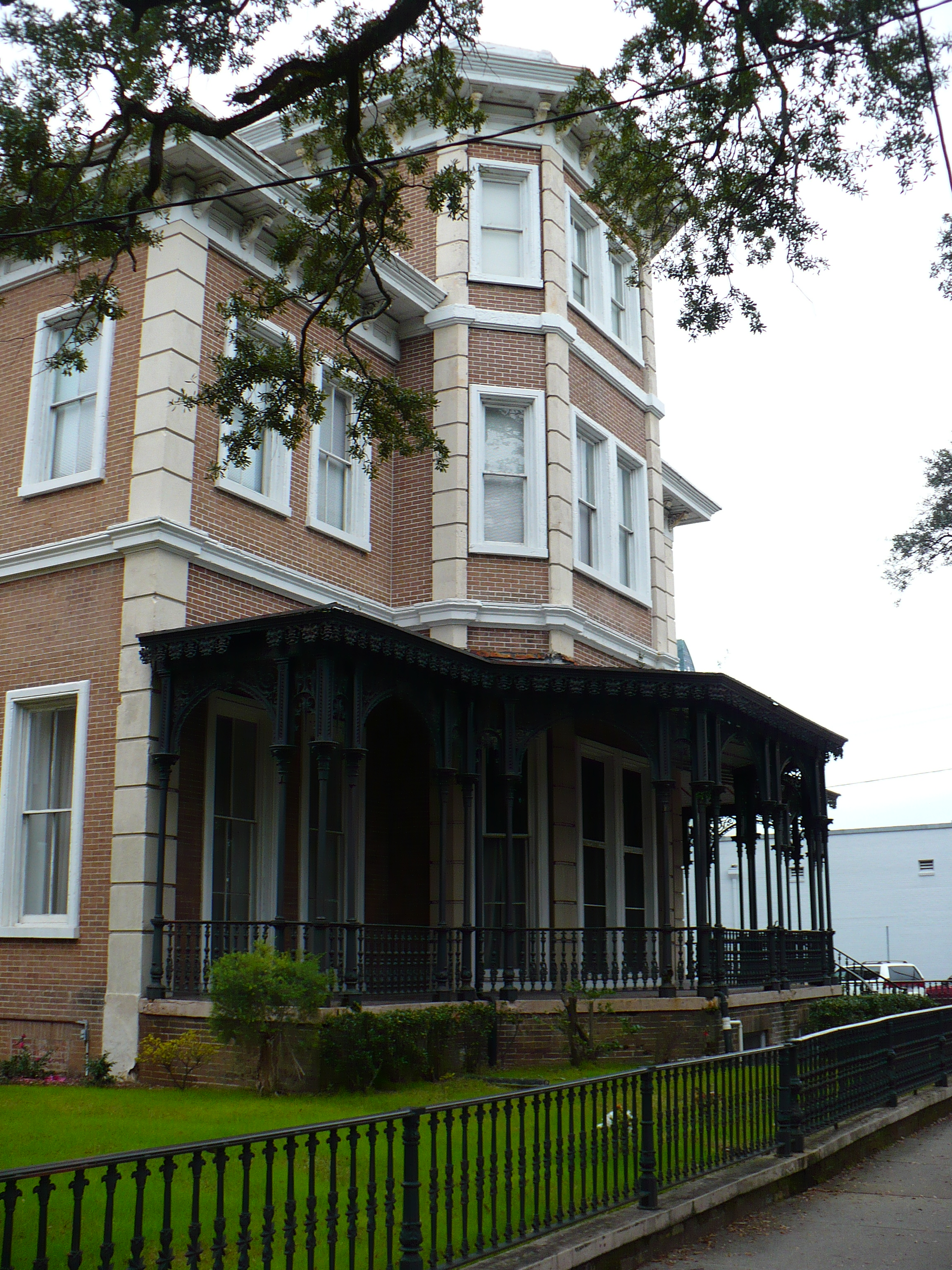
William Ketchum House at 400, built in 1860. Now home to the Archbishop of Mobile.

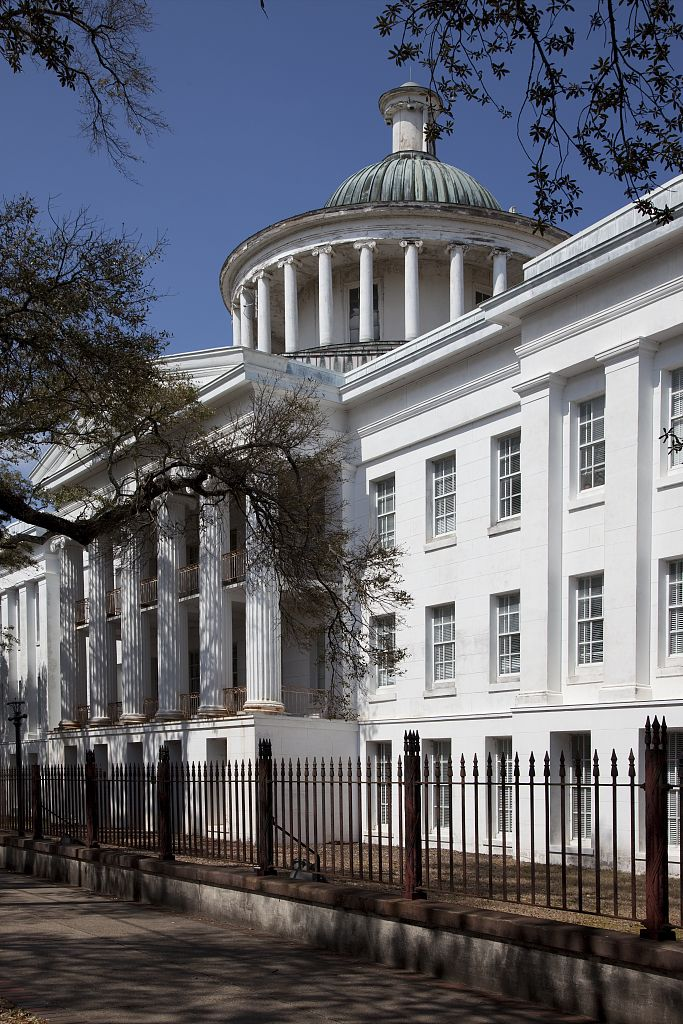
Barton Academy at 504, built in 1836. On the National Register of Historic Places.

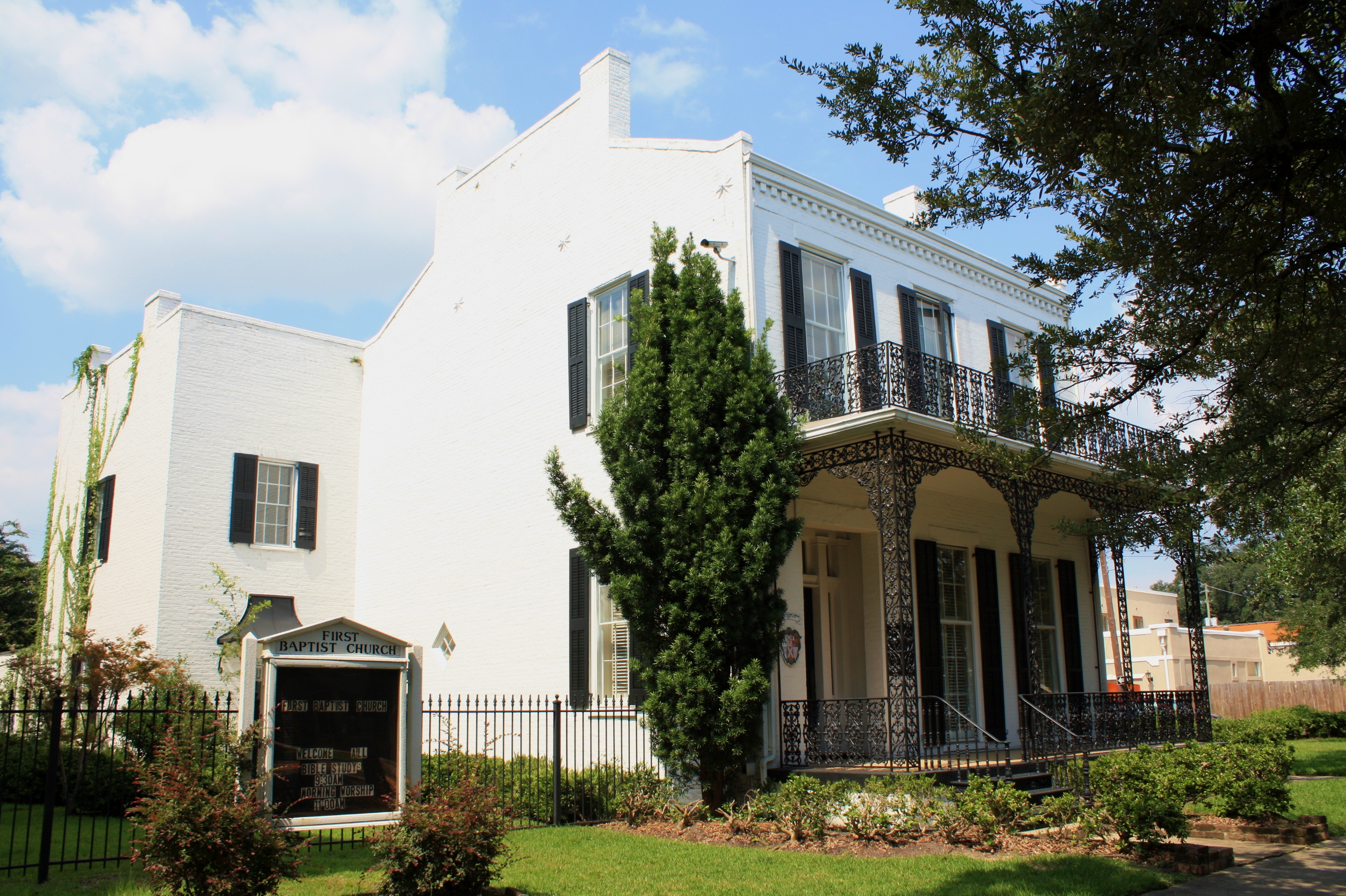
Admiral Raphael Semmes House at 804, built in 1858. On the National Register of Historic Places. Post-Civil War home of Raphael Semmes, captain of the CSS Alabama.

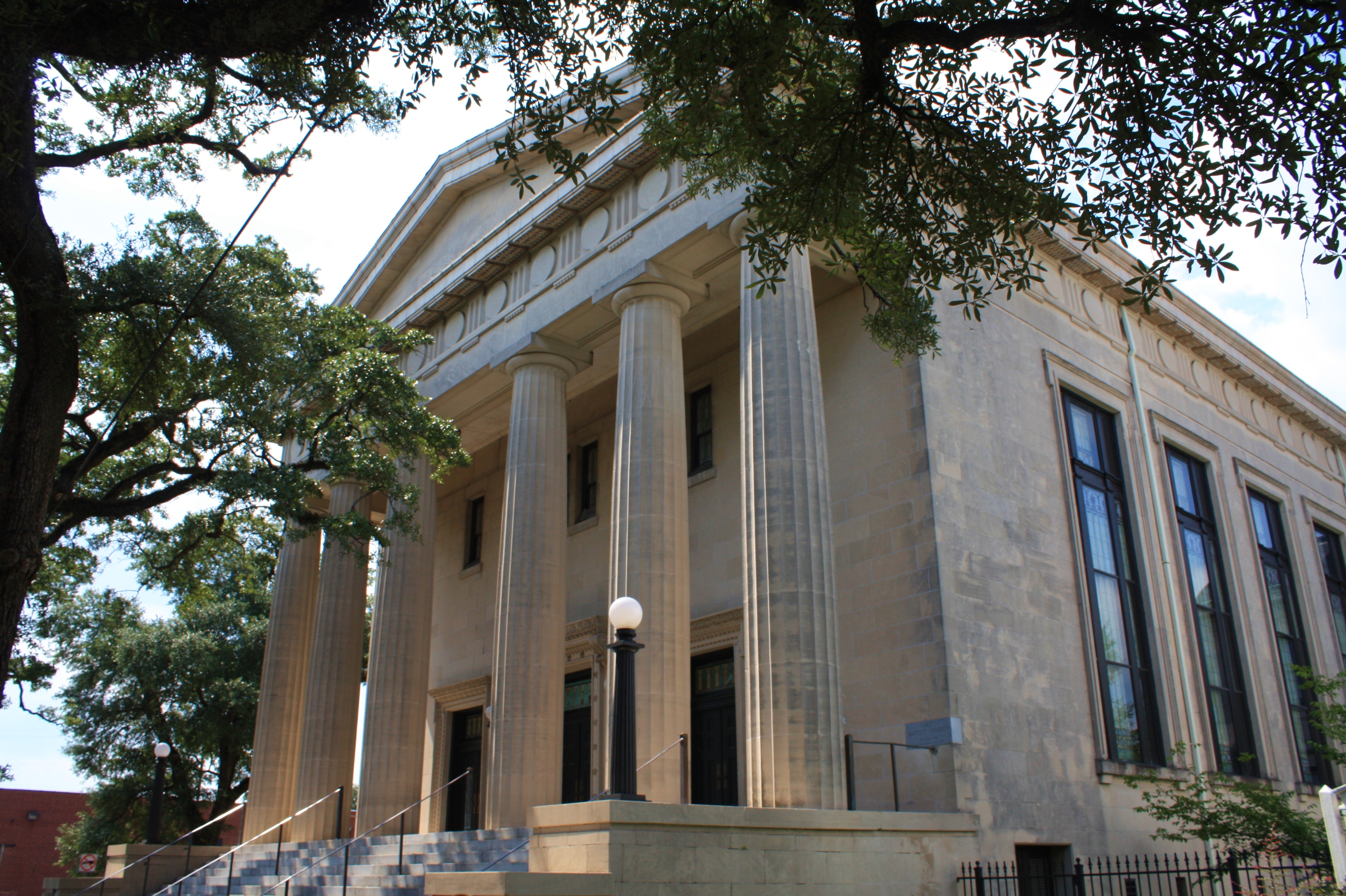
First Baptist Church of Mobile at 806, built in 1909.

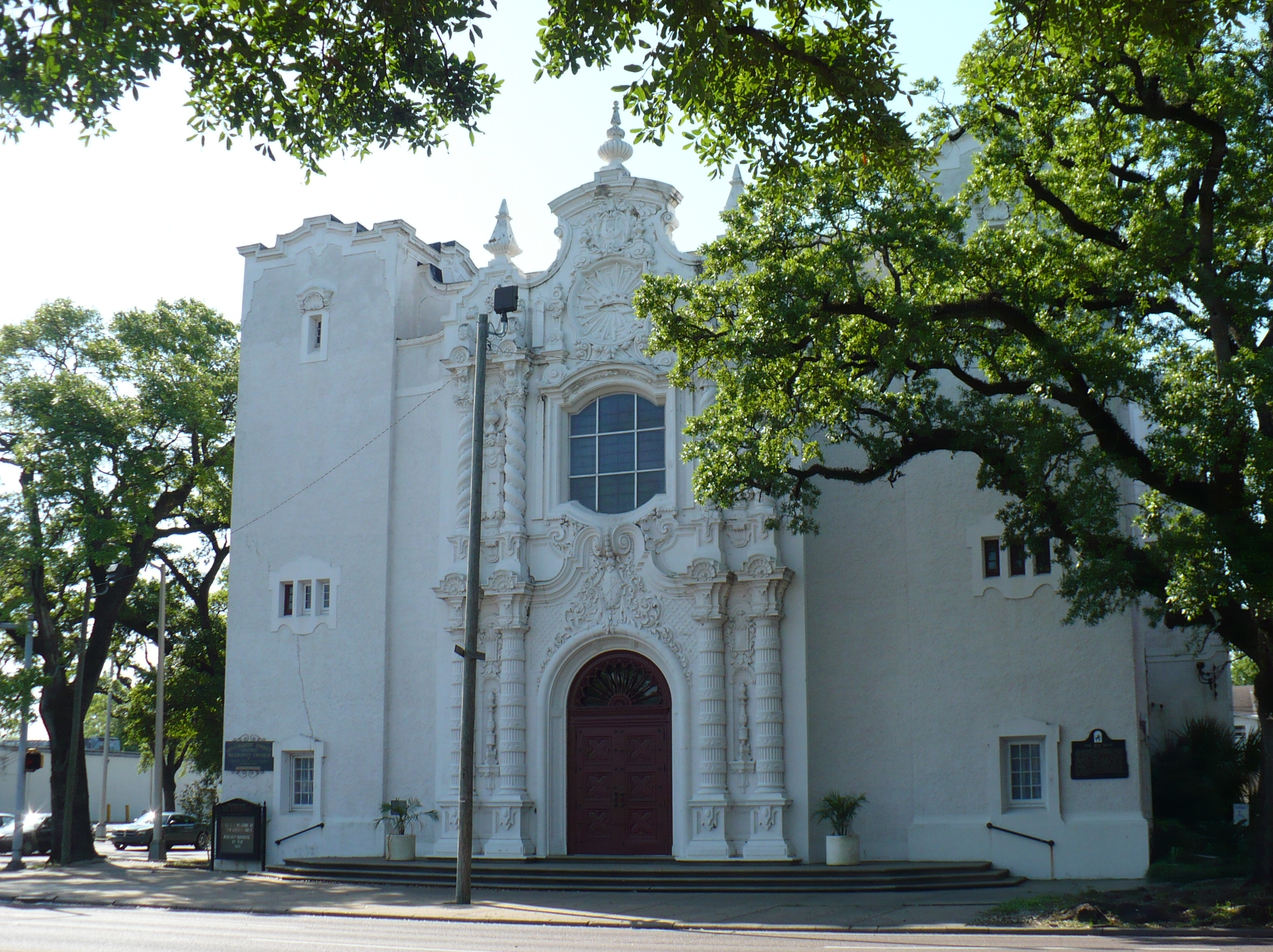
Government Street Methodist Church at 901, built from 1906–17.

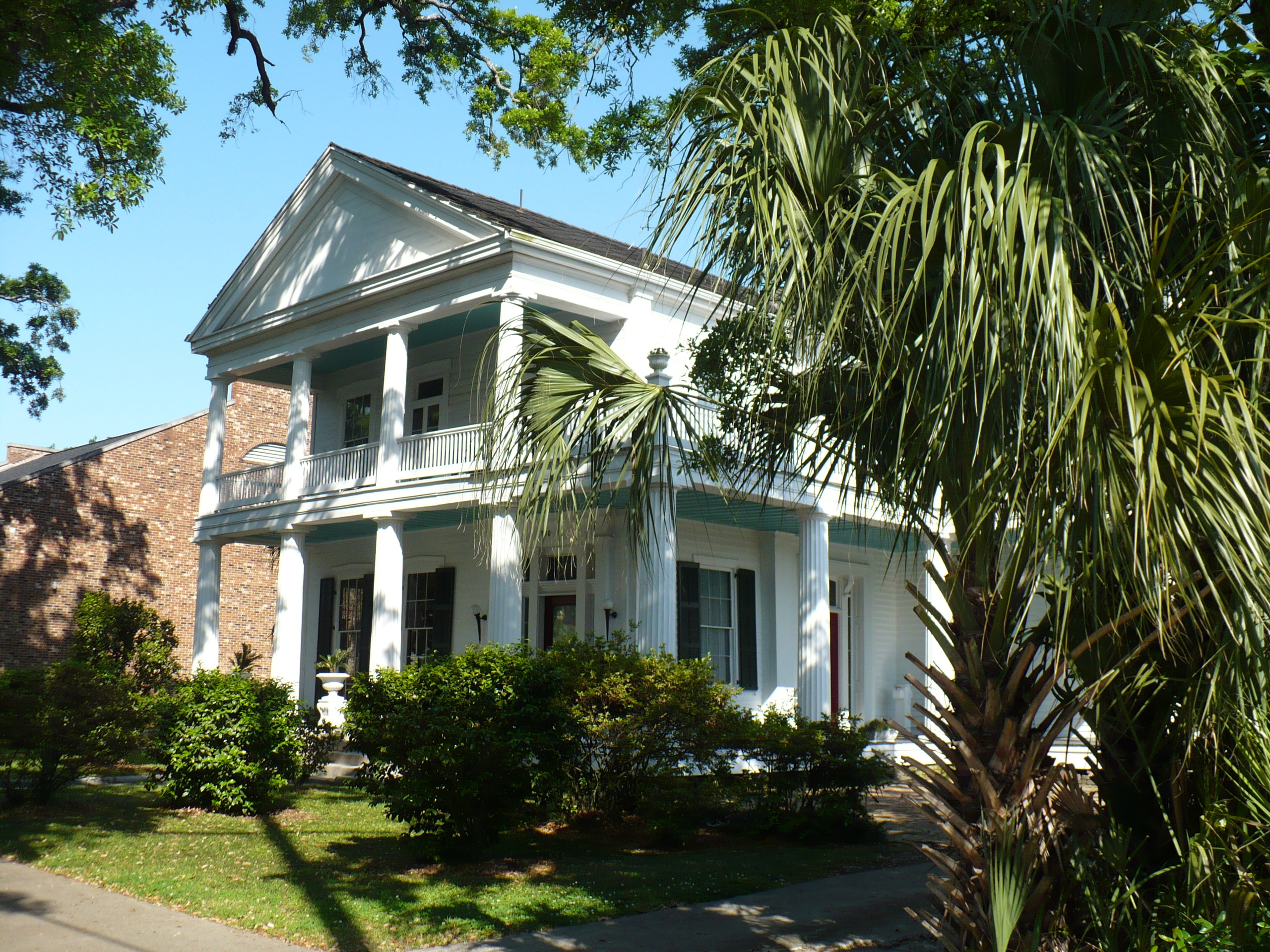
Roberts-Taylor-Isbell House at 910, built in 1837.

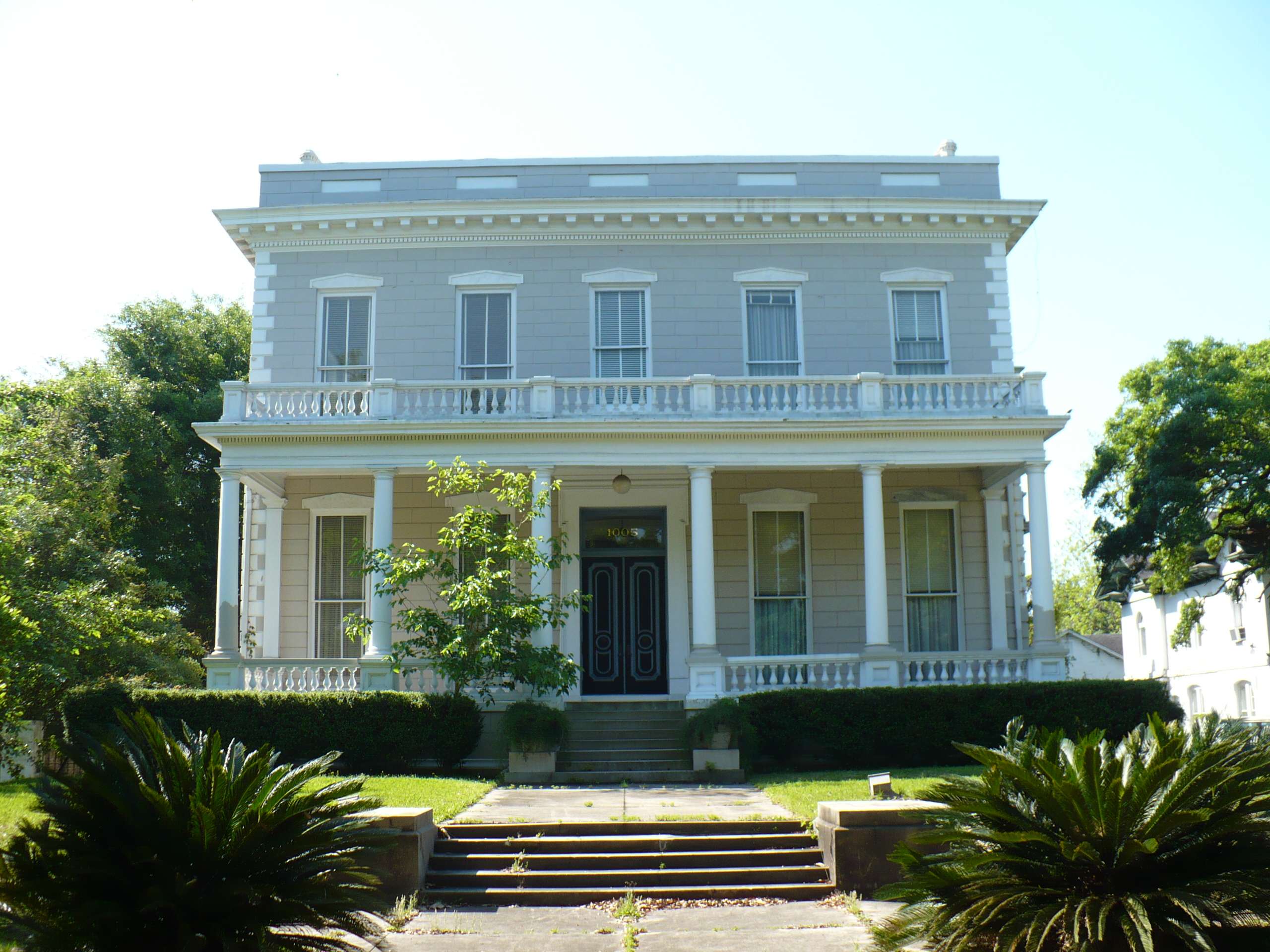
Rapelje-DeLaney House at 1005, built in 1865.

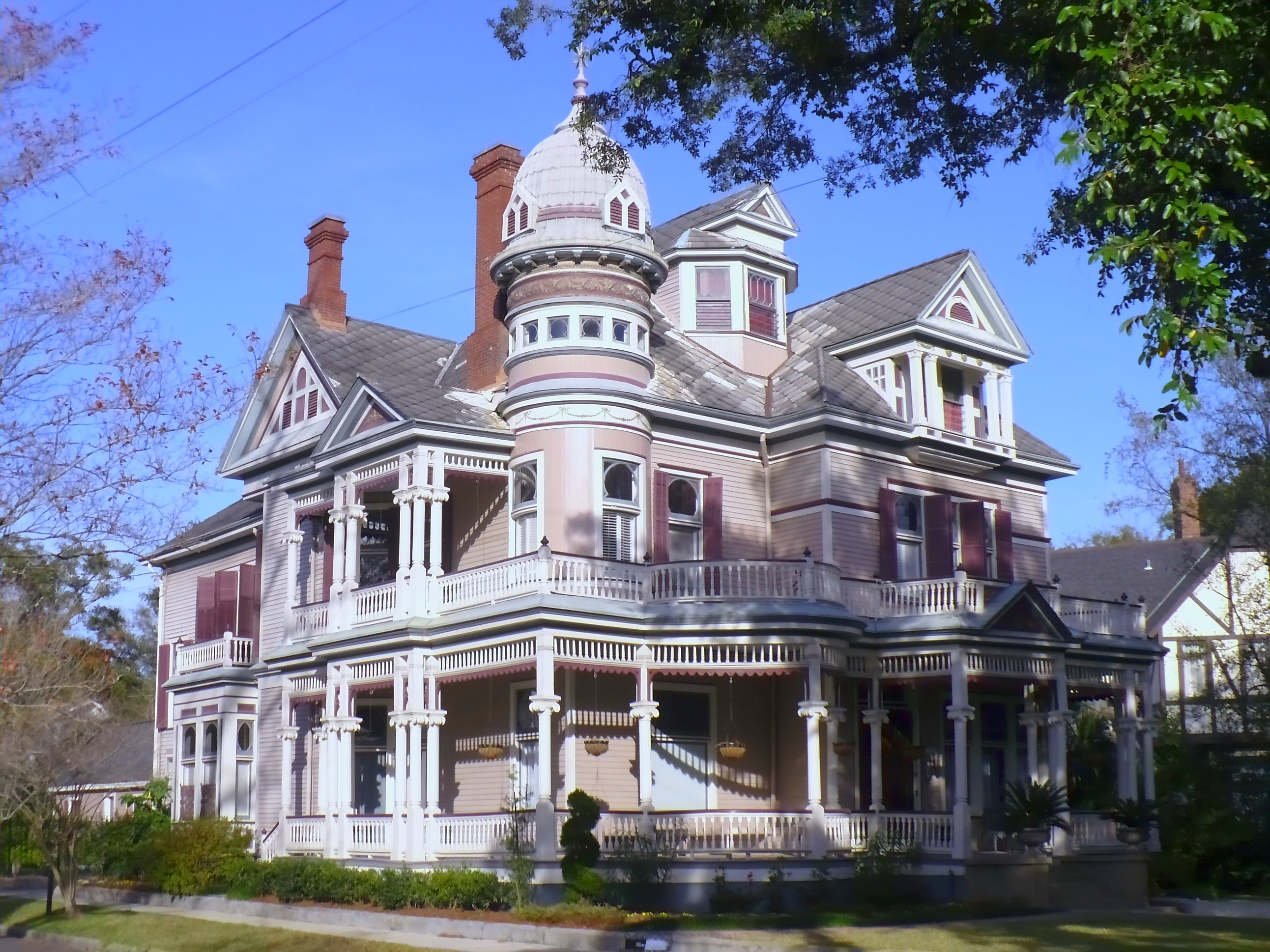
Tacon-Barfield Mansion at 1216, built in 1901.

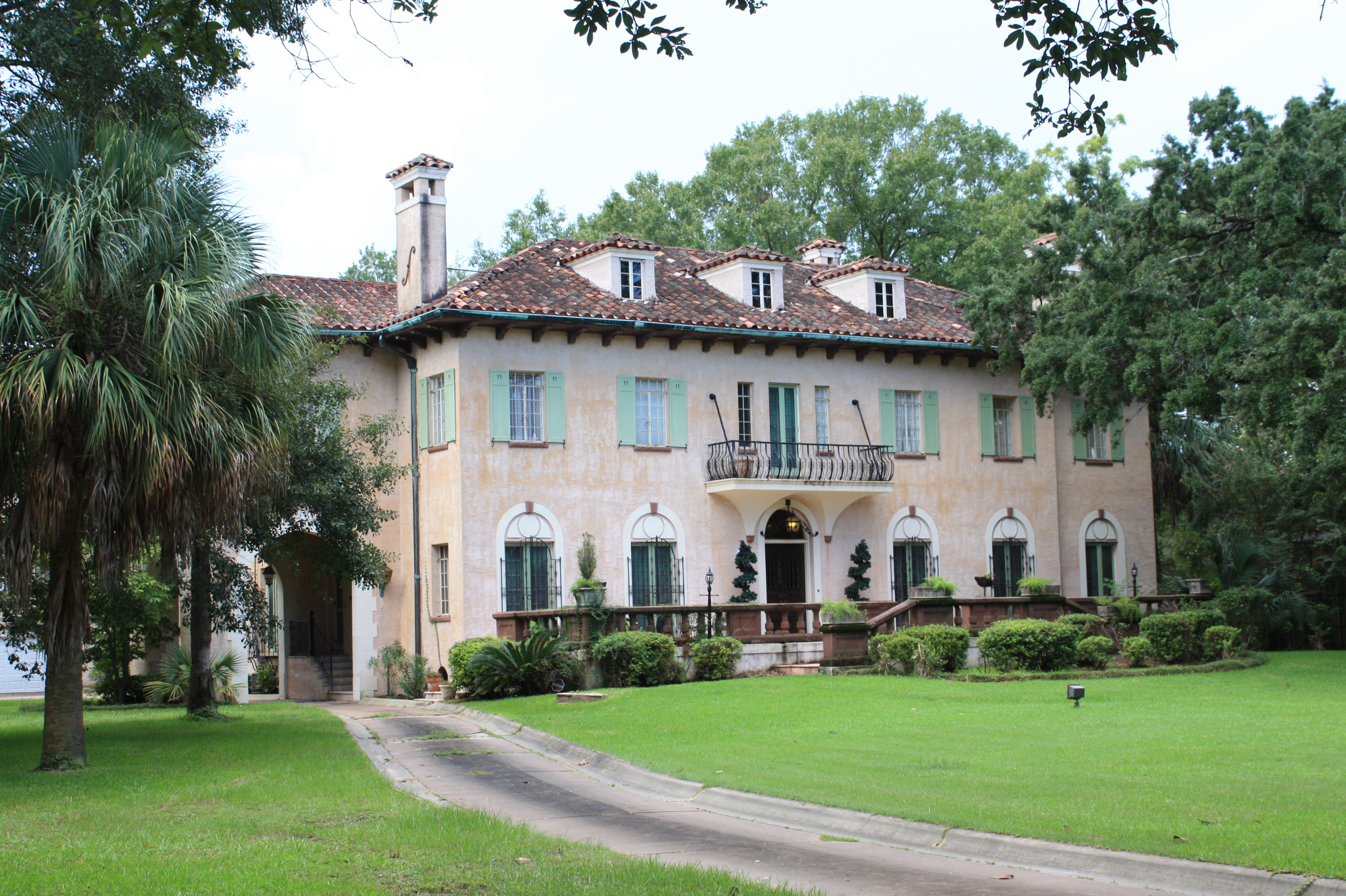
Paterson-Dean House at 1673, built in 1923.

== See also ==
- U.S. Route 90 in Alabama
- U.S. Route 98 in Alabama
- Kennedy House (Mobile, Alabama)
