= Kennedy House (Mobile, Alabama) =

House in Mobile, Alabama, U.S.

Coordinates: 30.6873°N 88.0493°W

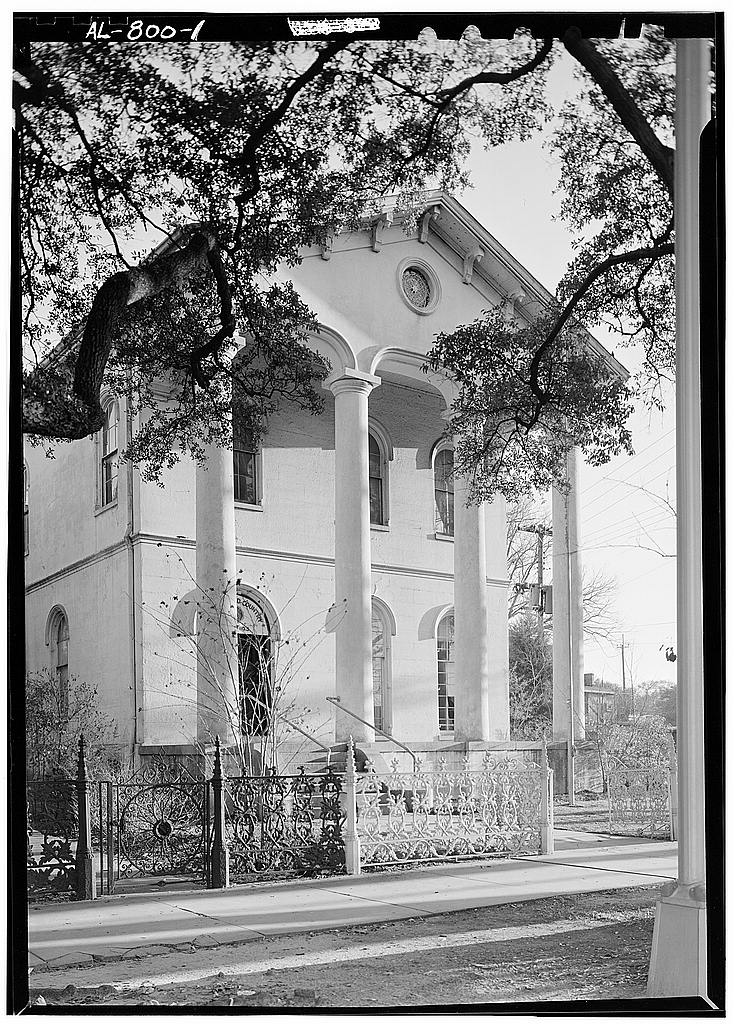
Front, on Government Street, January 1963. Photo by Jack Boucher.

The Kennedy House (also Joshua Kennedy House or Kennedy-Cox House, and formerly known as Barnwell-Mitchell House) at 607 Government Street in Mobile, Alabama, was built by local landowner Joshua Kennedy, Jr in 1857.

== Description ==
It is a stuccoed brick two storey townhouse with monumental columns at the front, bracketed eaves, and arched windows. The building was catalogued for the Historic American Buildings Survey of Alabama, HABS AL-800, and photographed by Jack Boucher; at the time the notes were typed for the survey, in 1979, the building was also called "Barnwell-Mitchell House". The HABS documentation described it thusly:

Brick with stucco scored to simulate ashlar, rectangular (three-bay front) with long offset rear wing, two stories, gable roof with single cross-gable, wide bracketed eaves, full-height pedimented four-column portico reflecting transition between Classic Revival and Italianate, arched openings with hood molds, bay window on W side, L-shaped wooden gallery in rear; side hall plan, ornate interior woodwork, curved stair with statuary niche, denticulated plaster cornice; notable cast-iron fence. Built 1857 for wealthy local merchant; later Seamen's Bethel; American Legion headquarters since 1947; later addition to rear wing. Outstanding local example of late ante-bellum architectural eclecticism, 4 ext. photos (1963), 2 int. photos (1963).

Joshua Kennedy (who died fighting for the Confederate Army near Richmond, Virginia in 1862.) and his descendants lived there until 1923, after which for two decades it was the Merchant Navy Club of the Seamen's Church Institute of Mobile (colloquially the "Seamen's Bethel"). It was renovated by the American Legion Post #3, which earned the Legion an award in 1950 from the Historic Mobile Preservation Society and the house a listing in the 1963 Historical American Buildings Survey, but had fallen into disrepair by 2012.

Mobile's 1857 Foundation, with financial support from one of Mobile's mystic societies, renovated the house (for $2 million) in the 2010s; it reopened in 2020.

== See also ==
- Church Street East Historic District
