= Statue of Raphael Semmes =

Statue formerly displayed in Mobile, Alabama

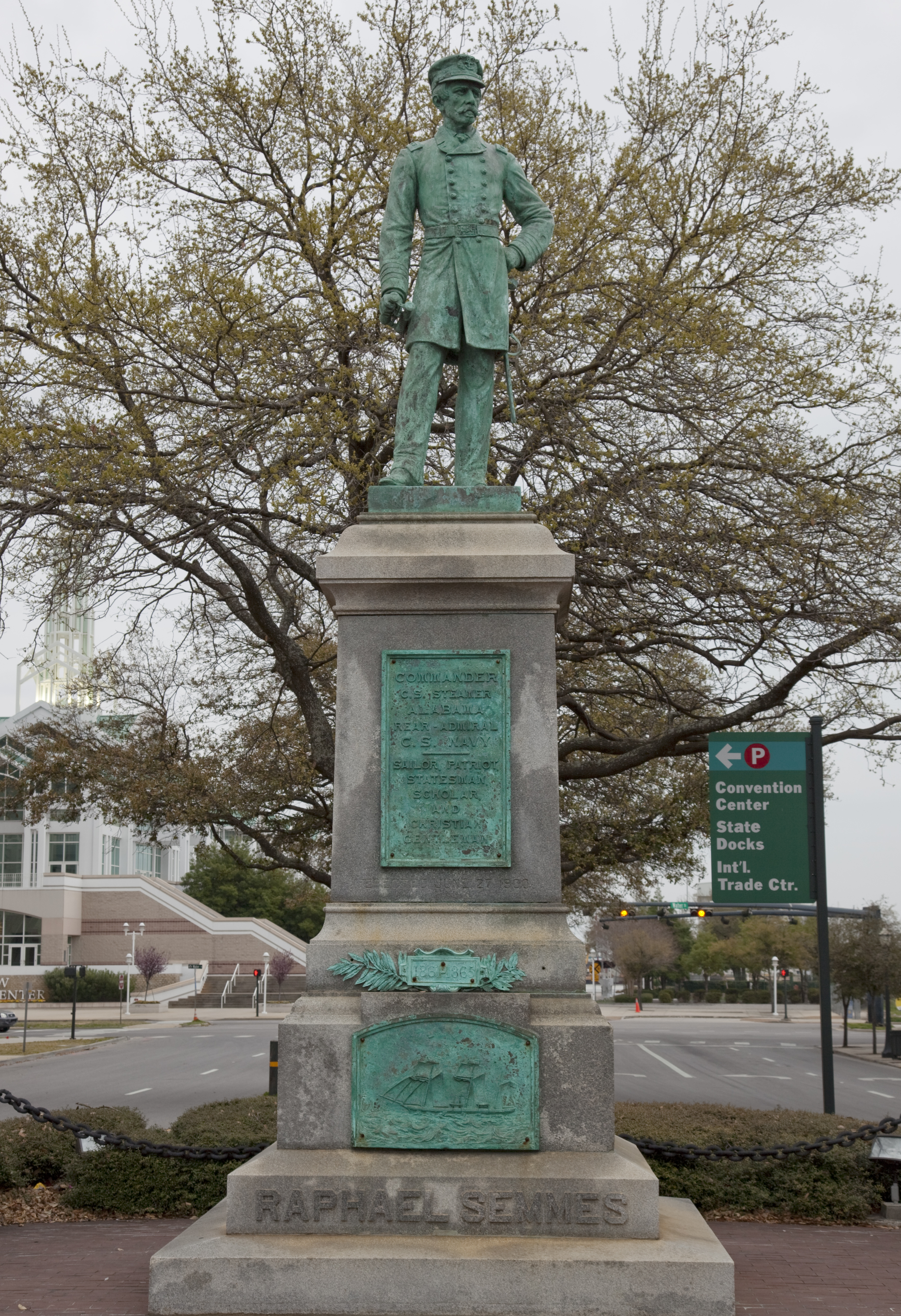
- The statue in 2010
- Artist: Caspar Buberl
- Year: 1900
- Subject: Raphael Semmes
- Location: Government Street, Mobile, Alabama, U.S.; 30.69037°N 88.04003°W

A statue of the Confederate naval officer Raphael Semmes was displayed in Mobile, Alabama, since June 1900. It was removed on 5 June 2020 during the George Floyd protests, and was Relocated to the History Museum of Mobile.

The city's mayor, Sandy Stimpson, stated that "Moving this statue will not change the past. It is about removing a potential distraction so we may focus clearly on the future of our city". Alabama Attorney General Steve Marshall subsequently threatened to prosecute the city, levying a $25,000 fine for removing the statue, if the removal becomes permanent.

== See also ==
- List of monuments and memorials removed during the George Floyd protests
