= Raphael Semmes =

Confederate naval officer (1809–1877)

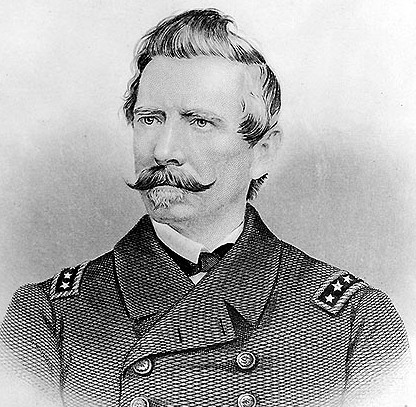
- Born: September 27, 1809; Nanjemoy, Maryland, US
- Died: August 30, 1877 (aged 67); Mobile, Alabama, US
- Military career
- Allegiance: United States; Confederate States
- Branch: United States Navy; Confederate States Navy
- Service years: 1826–1861 (USN); 1861–1865 (CSN)
- Rank: Commander (USN); Rear admiral (CSN)
- Nicknames: "Bim" and "Old Beeswax"
- Commands: USS Somers; CSS Sumter; CSS Alabama
- Wars: Mexican–American War; American Civil War

Raphael Semmes (/sɪmz/ SIMZ; September 27, 1809 – August 30, 1877) was an officer in the Confederate Navy during the American Civil War. He had served as an officer in the United States Navy from 1826 to 1860.

During the American Civil War, Semmes was captain of the cruiser CSS Alabama, the most successful commerce raider in maritime history, taking 65 prizes. Late in the war, he was promoted to rear admiral. He also acted as a brigadier general in the Confederate States Army from April 5 to April 26, 1865, although this appointment was never submitted to or officially confirmed by the Confederate Senate.

== Early life and education ==
Semmes was born in Charles County, Maryland, on Tayloe's Neck. He was a cousin of future Confederate general Paul Jones Semmes and of future Union Navy Captain Alexander Alderman Semmes.

He graduated from Charlotte Hall Military Academy and entered the U.S. Navy as a midshipman in 1826. Semmes first served on the Lexington, cruising the Caribbean and the Mediterranean until September 1826, when he was placed on leave for ill health. After a short convalescence, he served on the USS Erie for part of 1829 and on the USS Brandywine (formerly Susquehanna) for the rest of 1829 and the first nine months of the following year. On September 29, 1830, he was posted to the USS Porpoise of the West Indies squadron, which was attempting to suppress piracy in the Caribbean. Semmes then studied law and was admitted to the bar. He was promoted to lieutenant in February 1837.

== Career ==
During the Mexican–American War, he commanded the USS Somers in the Gulf of Mexico. In December 1846, a squall hit the ship while under full sail in pursuit of a vessel off Veracruz. Somers capsized and was lost along with 37 sailors. Semmes then served as first lieutenant on the USS Raritan, accompanied the landing force at Veracruz, and was dispatched inland to catch up with Army forces proceeding to Mexico City.

Following the war, Semmes went on extended leave at Mobile, Alabama, where he practiced law and wrote Service Afloat and Ashore During the Mexican War. He became extremely popular, and the nearby town of Semmes, Alabama, was named after him. He also maintained a home in Josephine, Alabama, on Perdido Bay. He was promoted to commander in 1855 and was assigned to lighthouse duties until 1860. After Alabama seceded from the Union, Semmes was offered a Confederate naval appointment by the provisional government; he resigned from the U.S. Navy the next day, February 15, 1861.

=== Confederate service ===
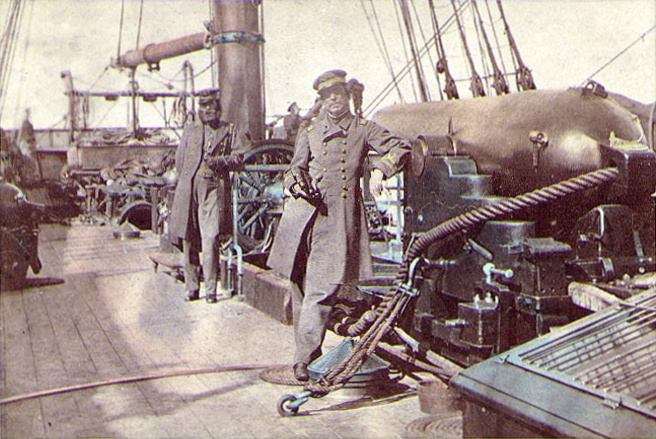
Semmes and John McIntosh Kell

After appointment to the Confederate Navy as a commander and a futile assignment to purchase arms in the North, Semmes was sent to New Orleans to convert the steamer Habana into the cruiser/commerce raider CSS Sumter. In June 1861, Semmes, in Sumter, outran USS Brooklyn, breaching the Union blockade of New Orleans, and then launched a career as a commerce raider captain.

Semmes's command of Sumter lasted only six months, but during that time he ranged wide, raiding US commercial shipping in both the Caribbean Sea and Atlantic Ocean; his actions accounted for the loss of 18 merchant vessels, while always eluding pursuit by Union warships. By January 1862, Sumter required a major overhaul. Semmes's crew surveyed the vessel while in neutral Gibraltar and determined that the repairs to her boilers were too extensive to be completed there. Semmes paid off the crew and laid up the vessel. Prevented by the efforts of the US consul from buying coal in Gibraltar, Semmes dispatched the ship's paymaster to Cadiz, Spain to purchase fuel. When the Southern agent stopped in Tangier, Morocco, he was arrested by the US consul. This sparked a minor diplomatic crisis known as the Tangier Difficulty, and Semmes strenuosly applied himself through diplomatic channels to obtain his crewman's release, but his efforts were unsuccessful. US Navy vessels maintained a vigil outside the harbor until the Sumter was disarmed and sold at auction in December 1862, eventually being renamed and converted to a blockade runner.

Semmes and several of his officers traveled to England, where he was promoted to captain. He then was ordered to the Azores to take up command and oversee the coaling and outfitting with cannon of the newly built British steamer Enrica as a sloop-of-war, which thereafter became the Confederate commerce raider CSS Alabama. Semmes sailed on Alabama from August 1862 to June 1864. His operations carried him from the Atlantic to the Gulf of Mexico, around Africa's Cape of Good Hope, and into the Pacific to the East Indies. During this cruise, Alabama captured 65 US merchantmen and quickly destroyed USS Hatteras, off Galveston.

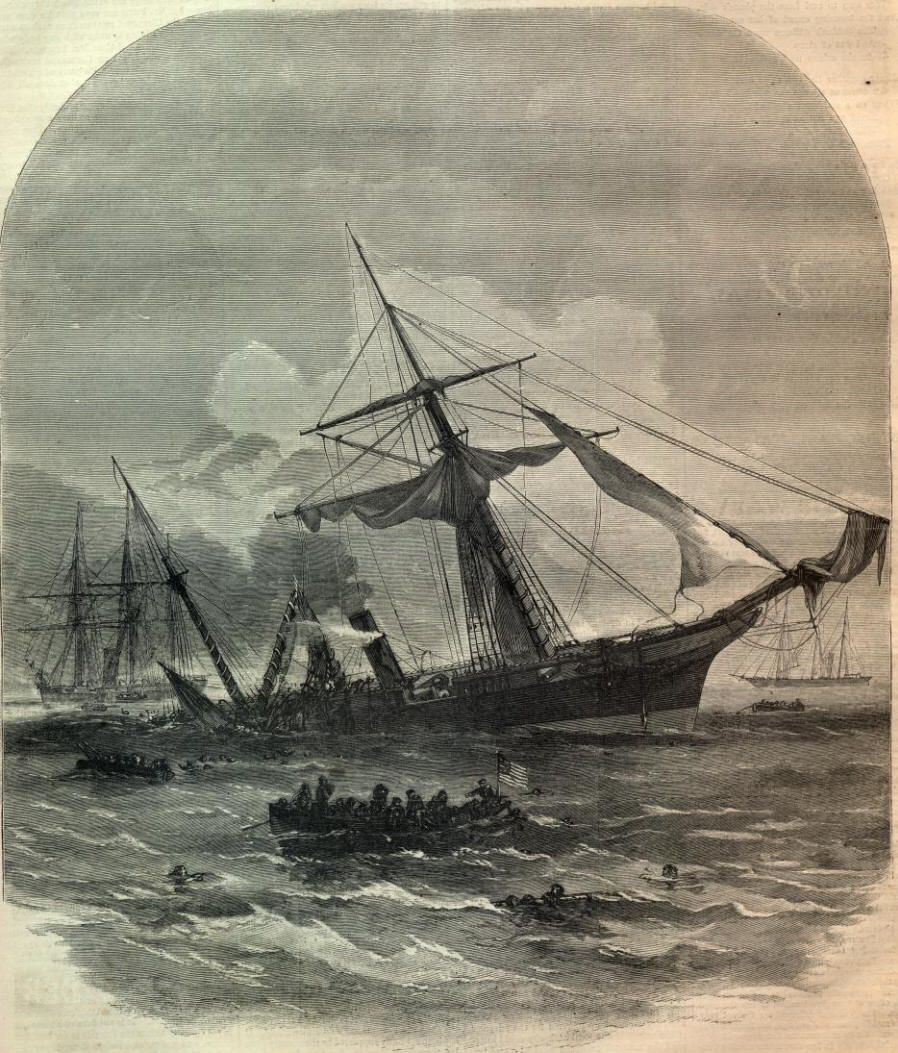
1864 engraving of the sinking of CSS Alabama

Alabama finally sailed back to the Atlantic and made port in Cherbourg, France, for a much-needed overhaul; she was soon blockaded by the pursuing Union steam sloop-of-war USS Kearsarge. Captain Semmes took Alabama out on June 19, 1864, and met the similar Kearsarge in one of the most famous naval engagements of the Civil War.

The commander of Kearsarge had, while in port at the Azores the year before, turned his warship into a makeshift partial ironclad; 30 feet (9.1 m) of the ship's port and starboard midsection were stepped-up-and-down to the waterline with overlapping rows of heavy chain armor, hidden behind black-painted wooden deal board covers. Alabama's much-too-rapid gunnery and misplaced aim, combined with the deteriorated state of her gunpowder and shell fuses, enabled a victory for both of Kearsarge's 11-inch (28 cm) Dahlgren smoothbore cannon. While Alabama opened fire at long range, Kearsarge steamed straight at her, exposing the Union sloop-of-war to potentially devastating raking fire. In their haste, however, Alabama's gunners fired many shells too high.

At 1,000 yards (910 m), Kearsarge turned broadside to engage and opened fire. Soon the heavy 11-inch (28 cm) Dahlgren cannon began to find their mark. After receiving a fatal shell to the starboard waterline, which tore open a portion of Alabama's hull, causing her steam engine to explode from the shell's impact, Semmes was forced to order the striking of his ship's Stainless Banner battle ensign and later to display a hand-held white flag of surrender to finally halt the engagement.

As the commerce raider was going down by the stern, Kearsarge stood off at a distance and observed at the orders of her captain, John Ancrum Winslow, who eventually sent rescue boats for survivors after taking aboard Alabama survivors from one of the raider's two surviving longboats. As his command sank, the wounded Semmes threw his sword into the sea, depriving Kearsarge's Winslow of the traditional surrender ceremony of having it handed over to him as victor. Semmes was eventually rescued, along with 41 of his crewmen, by the British yacht Deerhound and three French pilot boats. He and his men were taken to England where all but one recovered; while there they were hailed as naval heroes, despite the loss of Alabama.

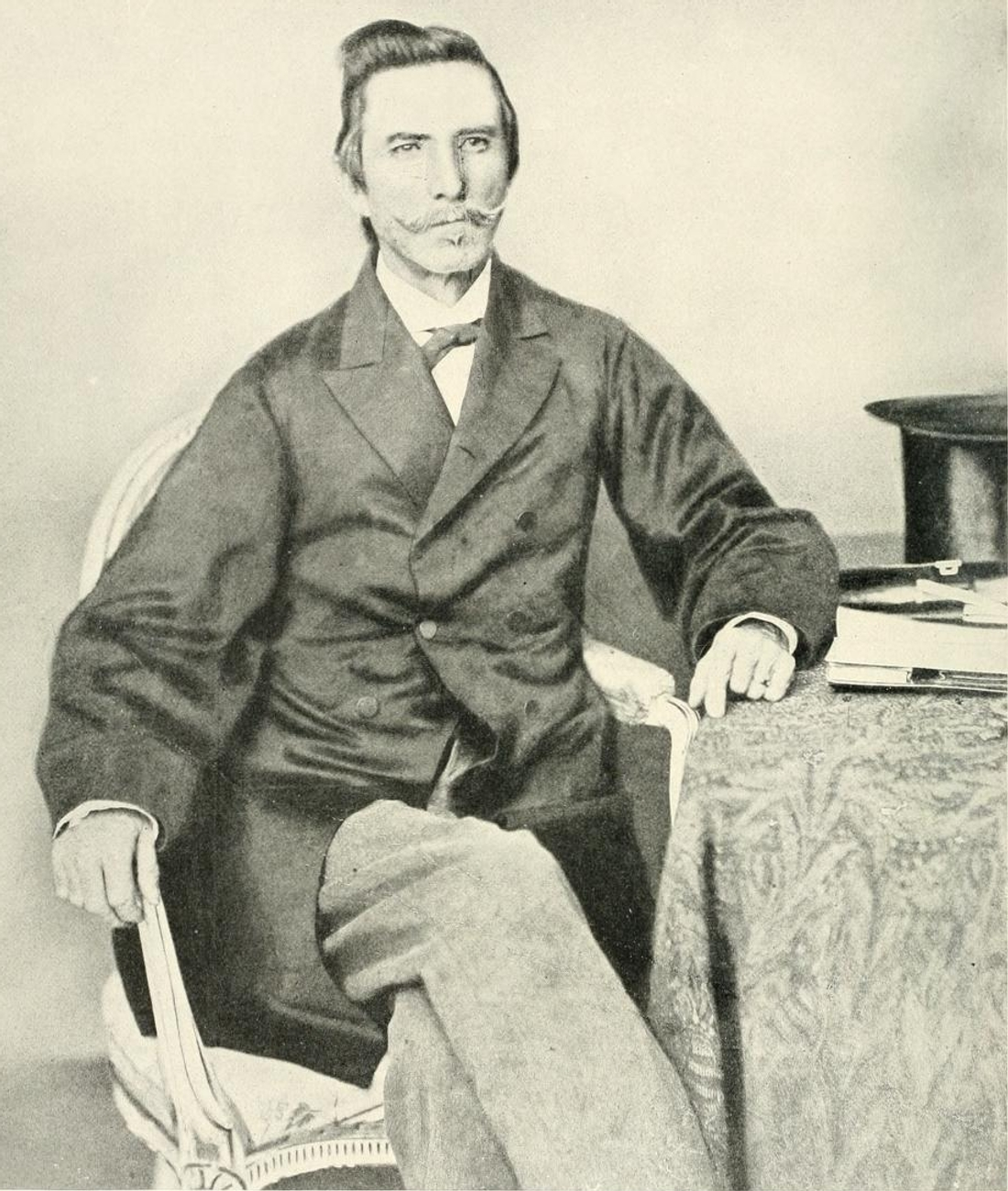
Raphael Semmes

From England, Semmes made his way back to America via Cuba and from there a safe shore landing in Matamoros, Mexico. It took his small party many weeks of journeying through the war-devastated South before he was finally able to make his way to the Confederate capital. He was promoted to rear admiral in February 1865, and during the last months of the war he commanded the boxed-in James River Squadron from his flagship, the heavily armored ironclad CSS Virginia II.

With the fall of Richmond, in April 1865, Semmes supervised the destruction of all the squadron's nearby warships and thereafter acted as a brigadier general in the Confederate States Army, the implication being that he was appointed to that grade. Historians John and David Eicher show Semmes as appointed to the grade of temporary brigadier general (unconfirmed) on April 5, 1865.

Semmes's appointment as a brigadier general was at most an informal arrangement made four days before General Robert E. Lee's surrender of the Army of Northern Virginia at the Battle of Appomattox Courthouse on April 9, 1865. That appointment was not and could not have been submitted to or confirmed by the Confederate Senate, since the Second Confederate Congress adjourned for the last time on March 18, 1865. Historian Bruce Allardice notes that Semmes was vague about this appointment in his memoirs and considered his naval rank of rear admiral to be the equivalent of a brigadier general.

After the destruction of the naval squadron, Semmes's sailors were turned into an infantry unit and dubbed the "Naval Brigade"; Semmes was then placed in command. His intention for the brigade was to join Lee's army after burning their vessels. Lee's army, however, was already cut off from Richmond, so most of Semmes's men boarded a train and escaped to join General Joseph E. Johnston's army in North Carolina. A few men of the Naval Brigade were able to join with Lee's rear guard and fought at the Battle of Sailor's Creek.

Semmes and the Naval Brigade were surrendered to Union Major General William T. Sherman with Johnston's army at Bennett Place near Durham Station, North Carolina; he was subsequently paroled on May 1, 1865. Semmes's parole notes that he held commissions as both a brigadier general and rear admiral in the Confederate service when he surrendered with General Johnston's army. He insisted on his parole being written to include the brigadier general commission in anticipation of being charged with piracy by the United States government.

=== After the war ===
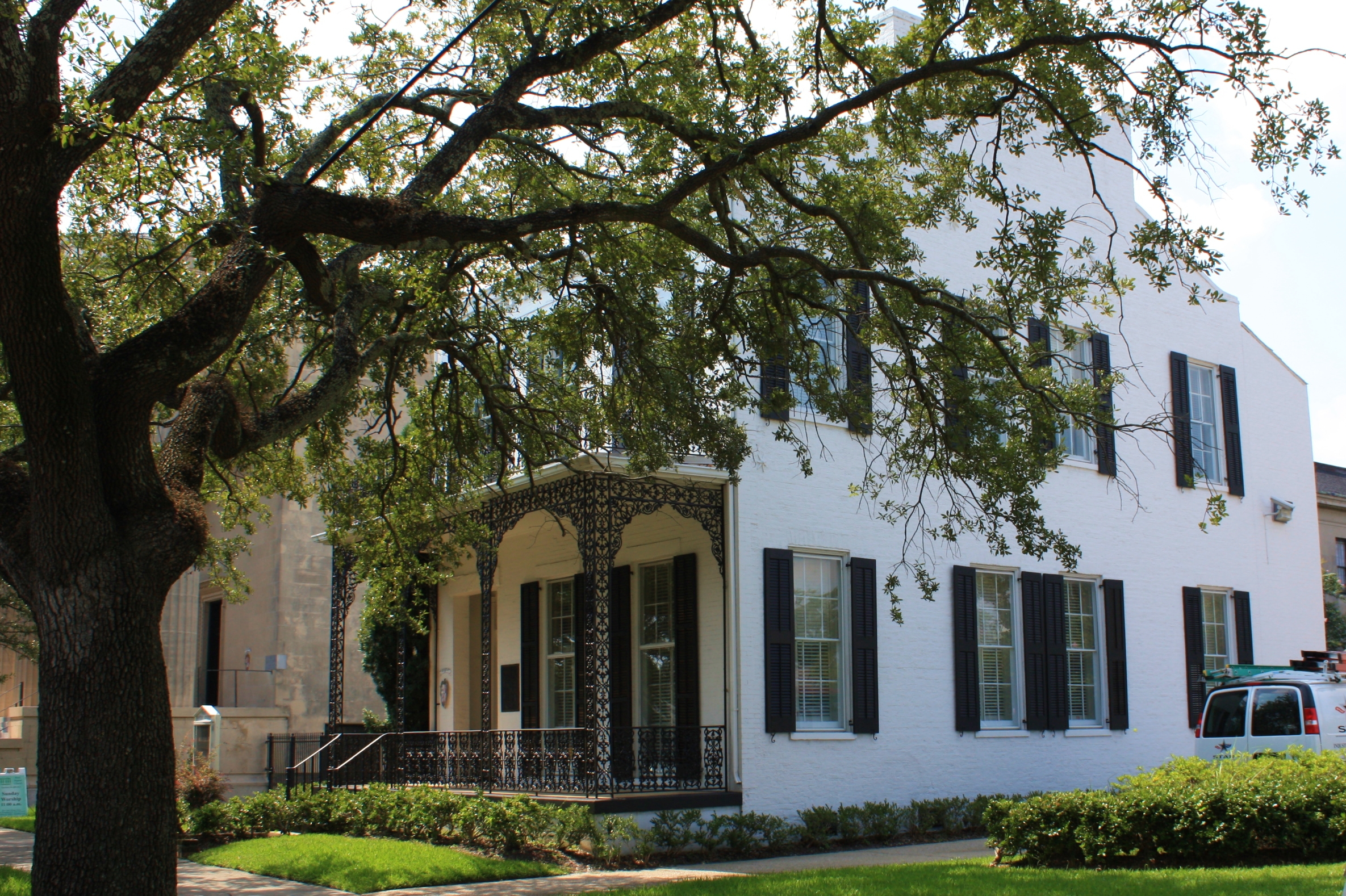
Raphael Semmes House at 804 Government Street in Mobile, Alabama, occupied by him 1871–1877, listed on the National Register of Historic Places

The U.S. briefly held Semmes as a prisoner after the war, but released him again on a second parole, then later rearrested him for treason on December 15, 1865. After a good deal of behind-the-scenes legal and political machinations, all charges were eventually dropped, and he was released on April 7, 1866.

In October 1866, the Louisiana State Seminary (today's Louisiana State University) offered Semmes a position as Professor of Moral Philosophy and English Literature. The position paid $3,000 per year. Semmes assumed this role on January 1, 1867. His fellow faculty-members described him as "dignified and easy to talk with". His teaching consisted mainly of formal lectures, with very little open discussion or questions. After only five months on campus, Semmes resigned from academia to take over as editor of the Memphis Bulletin newspaper in Memphis, Tennessee.

He defended his actions of warfare at sea and the political actions of the seceded southern states in his 1869 Memoirs of Service Afloat During The War Between the States. The book was viewed by some, including Putnam's Magazine, as one of the most cogent but bitter defenses of the South's "Lost Cause". Semmes is credited with helping to popularize the term “War Between the States".

In 1871, the citizens of Mobile presented Semmes with the Raphael Semmes House, an 1858 brick townhouse at 804 Government Street. He lived there until he died in 1877, from complications that followed food poisoning from eating some contaminated shrimp. Semmes was interred in Mobile's Old Catholic Cemetery.

== Legacy ==
Semmes's Confederate ensign

Semmes is a member of the Alabama Hall of Fame. One of the streets on the current Louisiana State University campus once carried his full name, as does Semmes Avenue in Richmond, Virginia. A life-sized statue of Admiral Semmes was removed by the city of Mobile early on June 5, 2020. The City of Semmes in western Mobile County is named after him, as well as a hotel in downtown Mobile, The Admiral Hotel.

When Semmes returned to the South from England, he brought a ceremonial Stainless Banner (the second national flag of the Confederacy, used 1863–1865) with him. It was inherited by his grandchildren, Raphael Semmes III and Mrs. Eunice Semmes Thorington. After his sister's death, Raphael Semmes III donated the ensign to the state of Alabama on September 19, 1929. Today, the battle ensign resides in the collection of the Alabama Department of Archives and History among its Confederate Naval collection, listed as "Admiral Semmes' Flag, Catalogue No. 86.1893.1 (PN10149-10150)". Their provenance reconstruction shows that it was presented to Semmes by "Lady Dehogton and other English ladies" in England sometime after the sinking of the Alabama.

== References to Semmes in literature ==
In 1998, William Butcher identified a possible link between the Birkenhead, England-built CSS Alabama and Captain Nemo's Nautilus from the 1869 Jules Verne novel Twenty Thousand Leagues Under the Sea. Butcher said, "The Alabama, which claimed to have sunk 75 merchantmen, was destroyed by the Unionist Kearsarge off Cherbourg on 11th June 1864….This battle has clear connections with Nemo’s final attack, also in the English Channel." Verne had himself made a comparison between the Alabama and the Nautilus in a letter to his publisher Pierre-Jules Hetzel in March 1869.

Writing in the April 2025 edition of Foundation – The International Review of Science Fiction, John Lamb stated there were many links between the fictional Captain Nemo, the Nautilus and Raphael Semmes the Confederate Captain of the commerce raider CSS Alabama in the American Civil War. Lamb wrote

Both the Alabama and the Nautilus were mainly built in Birkenhead. Both Semmes and Nemo were gifted natural historians. Nemo's motto was ‘Mobilis in Mobile’ while Semmes was from Mobile Alabama. Semmes was branded a pirate by Abraham Lincoln, who put a bounty on Semmes's head, and Semmes was chased around the seas by Admiral Farragut of the US Navy. Nemo, conversely, was branded a pirate by Captain Farragut of the US Navy, who put a bounty on Nemo's head, and Nemo was chased around the seas by the ship Abraham Lincoln. Both Semmes and Nemo encounter an imaginary island, sail through a patch of white water, encounter fake Havana cigars, mention coral mausoleums, shelter in an extinct volcanic island, and have their final battle off Cherbourg. Semmes had a portrait of the Confederate President, Jefferson Davis, in his cabin while Nemo had a portrait of the Union President, Abraham Lincoln, in his. The Alabama was bankrolled from the Confederate headquarters at Nautilus House Liverpool.

Some have argued that there is a Semmes connection to Robert Louis Stevenson's 1883 adventure novel Treasure Island.

In Harry Turtledove's series Southern Victory, Raphael Semmes is the grandfather of Gabriel Semmes, the President of the Confederate States of America.

Semmes is the namesake of the protagonist of E. O. Wilson's Anthill and Scott O'Dell's The 290.

In Margaret Mitchell's novel Gone with the Wind, he is briefly mentioned in chapter 9, during the scene at the Atlanta bazaar.

== Dates of rank ==
- Midshipman, USN – April 1, 1826
- Passed midshipman, USN – April 26, 1832
- Lieutenant, USN – February 9, 1837
- Commander, USN – September 14, 1855
- Resigned from USN – February 15, 1861
- Commander, CSN – March 26, 1861
- Captain, CSN – July 15, 1862
- Rear admiral, CSN – February 10, 1865
