= Martin Horst House =

Historic house in Alabama, United States

- U.S. National Register of Historic Places
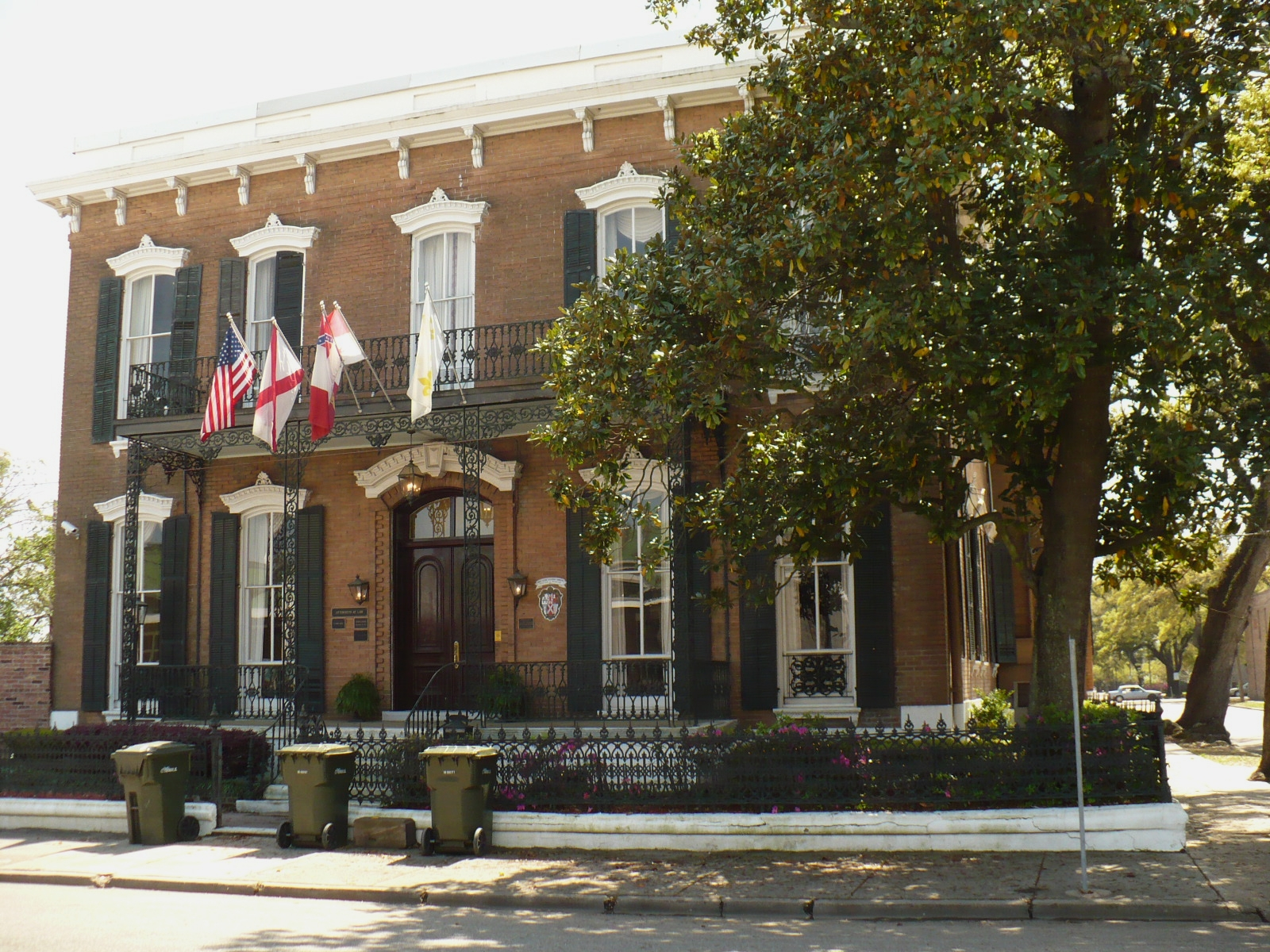
- The Martin Horst House in 2008

- Location within Mobile, Alabama Location within Alabama Location within the United States
- Location: Mobile, Alabama
- Coordinates: 30°41′22″N 88°2′48″W
- Built: 1867
- Architect: George Woodward Cox
- Architectural style: Italianate
- NRHP reference No.: 71000103
- Added to NRHP: June 21, 1971

The Martin Horst House is a historic residence in Mobile, Alabama, United States. It was built in 1867 in the Italianate Style. The building was placed on the National Register of Historic Places on June 21, 1971.
