= Raphael Semmes House =

Historic house in Alabama, United States

- U.S. National Register of Historic Places
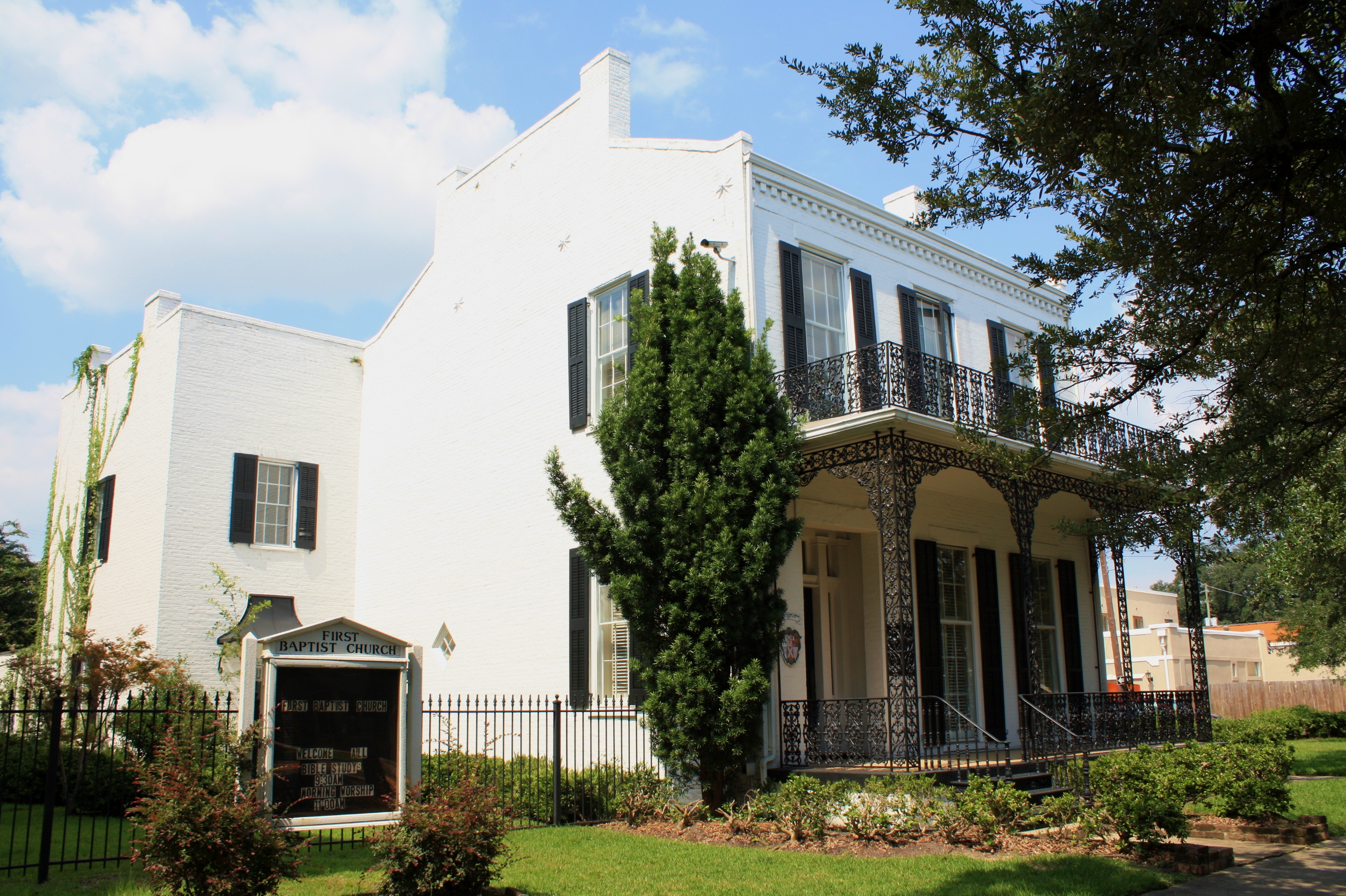

- Location within Mobile, Alabama Location within Alabama Location within the United States
- Location: 804 Government Street; Mobile, Alabama)
- Coordinates: 30°41′12″N 88°3′8″W
- Built: 1858
- Architect: Peter Horta
- Architectural style: Federal, Greek Revival
- NRHP reference No.: 70000110
- Added to NRHP: February 26, 1970

The Raphael Semmes House, (also known as the Horta–Semmes House), is a historic residence at 804 Government Street in Mobile, Alabama. It is best known as the 1871-1877 home of Raphael Semmes, captain of the Confederate States Navy sloop-of-war CSS Alabama, a commerce raider during the American Civil War. The 1858 brick townhouse of Federal and Greek Revival styles of architecture, was added to the National Register of Historic Places on February 26, 1970.

== History ==
The house was designed and built by its first owner, Peter Horta, in 1858. The structure was purchased in 1871 by the citizens of Mobile and presented to Semmes, who lived there until his death in 1877.

Several decades, owners, and residents later, Joseph Linyer Bedsole and his wife purchased and restored the townhouse. On April 22, 1946, they donated it to the adjacent First Baptist Church of Mobile in memory of their son, Lt. Joseph Linyer Bedsole Jr. of the United States Army Air Forces, who was killed in action over Nazi Germany in Europe during World War II.

== Architecture ==
The two-story, white-painted brick townhouse is in a simple Federal-style architecture, with an added Greek Revival-style doorway and surround. The front (south) facade has a full-width cast iron porch across the ground floor, added in the 1870s. The ironwork has a floral design motif. Built on a narrow city lot, the house is deeper than it is wide. The main body of the house measures about 30 feet (9.1 m) wide by 40 feet (12 m) deep. A two-story rear ell addition is attached to the northwest corner of the main house and measures about 15 feet (4.6 m) wide by 27 feet (8.2 m) deep, extending the depth of the house to 67 feet (20 m). The ell served as the service wing and was fronted on the courtyard side by wooden porch and balcony galleries on both floors that adjoined the matching rear galleries of the main house.

The interior layout has a stair hall on the west side of the house, on both floors. The stairway is mahogany with turned spindles. The stair hall opens onto a parlor and dining room on the first floor and three bedrooms on the second floor. The parlor and dining room retain their original fireplace mantles of cut-and-polished black marble. The ell contains a kitchen and storage room on the first floor and two servant rooms on the second.
