= Wayne Mack =

American sportscaster (1924–93)

- Born: Vernis McGlinn; May 22, 1924; Pekin, Illinois
- Died: April 1, 1993 (aged 68); New Orleans, Louisiana
- Sports commentary career
- Teams: New Orleans Saints professional football team Tulane University college football

Wayne Mack (May 22, 1924 – April 1, 1993) was a broadcast journalist, television entertainer, and sportscaster who served the New Orleans, Louisiana, market from 1958 to 1992.

== Early life and education ==
Mack was born Vernis McGlinn in Pekin, Illinois. He served in the United States military in World War II, after which he worked in a steel mill in Peoria, Illinois. He graduated from the Columbia School of Broadcasting in Chicago, Illinois in 1947. Mack subsequently worked briefly at a variety of radio stations before settling in New Orleans in 1958.

== Career as a television personality ==
External images
- Photographs of Wayne Mack
- “1984 photograph of Wayne Mack in a broadcaster's booth", as published in the New Orleans Times-Picayune newspaper
- "Photograph of Wayne Mack on the television studio set as the Great MacNutt", as available from The Historic New Orleans Collection

Mack was host of 1960s WDSU-TV, Channel 6, New Orleans, Louisiana children's television program that showed the “Three Stooges” shorts. His on-screen persona was the "Great McNutt” and he dressed in movie director's garb, along with a large megaphone. His big line was “Lights, camera, action, start the cotton pickin’ program!” just prior to the start of the short subject.

In the Three Stooges movie, “The Outlaws is Coming”, he played Jesse James. Mack appeared in a total of seven movies, including “The Killer Bees” and “Pretty Baby” (minor roles).

As in most early day television stations, he played several on-screen parts, including co-host of the “Midday" show, an electronic magazine program, as well as sportscasting in the local evening news. Mack also called radio play-by-play of the New Orleans Saints from 1975 to 1981. A flavor for Mack's broadcast style is provided by WDSU-TV, for whom Mack also served as sports director. Additionally, he was at times a broadcaster for Tulane University college football games with fellow sportscaster Bruce Miller. Following Mack's tenure at WDSU-TV, he served as sports director at radio station WGSO-AM, and he was spokesman for French Quarter bar Pat O'Brien's.

== Legacy as a sportscaster ==
Mack, together with fellow New Orleans sportscasters Hap Glaudi and Buddy Diliberto, provided the New Orleans television market with a unique and distinctive repertoire of sports broadcasters. The three New Orleans sportscasters were discussed together by New Orleans journalist Bill Baumgarner. Mack was posthumously named to the Greater New Orleans Broadcasters Hall of Fame. Mack authored a book detailing the early history of the New Orleans Saints professional football team. On July 13, 1993, Mack was also posthumously given the Fleur De Lis Award by the New Orleans Saints and admitted to their team's Hall of Fame.

Mack was married to Mary Lou Schmidt McGlinn and had six daughters. He died from cancer and was cremated in Metairie, Louisiana.
