= Bob Breck =

American former chief meteorologist (born 1947)

- Born: Robert E. Zabrecky; October 5, 1947 (age 77); Hammond, Indiana, U.S.
- Education: University of Michigan
- Occupation: Former chief meteorologist
- Years active: 1971–2015

Robert E. Zabrecky (born October 5, 1947), also known as Bob Breck, is an American former chief meteorologist for WVUE-DT in New Orleans.

== Early life and education ==
Robert E. Zabrecky was born on October 5, 1947, in Hammond, Indiana. Breck claims an early childhood interest in meteorology after a third-grade report about snow.

Breck went on to pursue a degree in Meteorology and Oceanography from the University of Michigan. After receiving his bachelor's degree in December 1969, he enrolled in the Marine Corps Reserve. In an effort to put his education to use, Breck appealed to an Indiana politician to fill a position in Florida monitoring hazardous weather conditions for Air Force fighter-pilot trainees.

== Career ==
Following his time with the Air Force Reserves, Breck's career in television began in 1971 at WTVT in Tampa, Florida where Breck learned from Roy Leep, the station's general manager.

In 1973 Breck moved to Dayton, Ohio to work at WDTN-TV2 as Chief Meteorologist. In 1978, after 5 years in this position he moved to New Orleans, Louisiana where he replaced Nash Roberts. Breck became Chief Meteorologist until he announced his retirement in 2015.
