= WLPN =

WLPN may refer to:

- WLPN-LP, a low-power radio station (105.5 FM) licensed to serve Chicago, Illinois, United States
- WLPN-LP (defunct), a defunct low-power television station (channel 61) formerly licensed to serve New Orleans, Louisiana, United States
