= Jim Henderson (sportscaster) =

American sportscaster (born 1947)

James Harmon Henderson (born July 29, 1947) is a former American sportscaster based in New Orleans. He was the radio voice announcer of the New Orleans Saints and also worked as a football analyst for WVUE-DT from 2012 to 2018. Before that, he worked for WWL-TV from May 8, 1978 to January 31, 2012.

== Early life and education ==
Henderson grew up in Rochester, New York, where he began calling Little League games. After receiving his bachelor's degree in English from the State University of New York at Cortland, he spent some time in the Army. He later earned a Masters in broadcasting from Syracuse University's S. I. Newhouse School of Public Communications.

== Career ==
Henderson began his sports reporting career with the sports director position at Panama City's then NBC affiliate WDTB-TV (now WMBB-TV, an ABC affiliate), then became a sports reporter at the NBC station in Atlanta, WSB-TV. Henderson joined WWL-TV on May 1, 1978 when he was offered a job as a sportscaster, succeeding the retiring Lloyd "Hap" Glaudi. Henderson with news anchors Garland Robinette and Angela Hill and Chief Meteorologist Nash Roberts helped Channel 4 become the dominant station in New Orleans, a position it holds to this day.

Henderson is a 13-time winner of the National Sportscasters and Sportswriters Association's Sportscaster of the Year Award, an award conferred by sports journalists from all over Louisiana. Henderson regularly traveled to the Super Bowl, The Masters, and the Major League Baseball All-Star Game because of his work as a reporter for CBS Newspath.

Henderson was the play-by-play announcer on Saints radio broadcasts from 1986 through 2017, formerly teaming with former Saints quarterback Archie Manning. Henderson and Manning broadcast Saints games to listeners (and preseason TV viewers) from 1986 to 1997, with the exception of the 1990 season (when Henderson called regional NFL telecasts on CBS). Henderson went on to team with former Saints running back Hokie Gajan on the radio. Gajan died in 2016 and Deuce McAllister took over as the color analyst. Henderson was at the microphone for the Saints' first two NFC Championship Game appearances, in 2006 and 2009, as well as their appearance in Super Bowl XLIV. His reference to that Super Bowl as the "Miracle in Miami" became his most famous call as a broadcaster (see below).

In August 2012, six months after retiring from WWL, Henderson joined rival station WVUE-DT, owned by Saints owner Tom Benson, as an analyst and commentator for the Saints for 6 more years.

Henderson occasionally works with Spencer Tillman on some College Football when Tim Brando is away.

On Feb. 1, 2018, Henderson announced that he has fully retired from broadcasting.

Henderson has residences in both Poplarville, Mississippi, and Mandeville, Louisiana. He is married and has two grown children.

== Quotes ==
Two receivers to the left, Garcon to the right. Manning in the shotgun, puts Collie in motion. Looks in his direction...it's picked off! It's picked off! It's Tracy Porter again! He's runnin' free! He's gonna go all the way! Hand outstretched...and it's a Saint touchdown! Seventy yards on the return! Seventy yards on the return by Porter! He did it to Favre, and now he's done it to Manning!

— Henderson's call of Tracy Porter's pivotal interception in Super Bowl XLIV.

Snap, placement, kick by Hartley, and it is — AND IT'S GOOD! IT'S GOOD! IT'S GUH-HUH-HOOD! Ha ha ha! Pigs have flown! Hell has frozen over! The Saints are on their way to the Super Bowl! Confetti fills the air, Saints fans on their feet, everybody in Black and Gold havin' the time of their lives, in the city that will not sleep tonight! All one Saints fans, worldwide! All one!

— The Saints win the 2009 NFC Championship on Garrett Hartley's field goal in overtime, 31-28, over the Minnesota Vikings on January 24, 2010. The Super Bowl berth was the first in Saints history.

Look at Sean Payton, Joe Vitt embracing on the sideline, the photographers running over there to get that shot. Get ready to party with the Lombardi, New Orleans! The miracle in Miami has happened! The Saints have won the Super Bowl!

— Henderson's call of the final seconds of the Saints' victory in Super Bowl XLIV.

Gowin, on 4th and 14 will punt it away. He hangs it very high, angling it for near sideline... Hakim drops the ball! Hakim drops the ball! Brian Milne might have fallen on it at the ten yard line! It IS the New Orleans Saints' football! Brian Milne, the most unlikely hero of them all, falls on the fumble, the muff by Hakim! There is a god after all!

— Henderson's call of Az-Zahir Hakim's fumble in the final two minutes of the Saints' 2000 wild card playoff game against the St. Louis Rams. The game was the first playoff win in the Saints' 34-year history.

The line of scrimmage, the 5 yard line. 4th and Goal from the 5, Manning pumps right, looks left, throws over the middle and it's incomplete! Incomplete, and the ball goes over to the Saints and the Saints' bench erupts! They're gonna be the Super Bowl Champions, it would appear, with 44 seconds left in this game!

— Henderson's call of Peyton Manning's final pass in Super Bowl XLIV: an incomplete pass on 4th down that gave the Saints the ball and their first and only Super Bowl victory

For the Saints to stay alive, pending the extra point by John Carney. NO!!! He missed the extra point wide right! Oh my God, how could he do that?!

— Henderson’s call of John Carney’s missed extra point after the River City Relay
