= WWL-TV =

Television station in New Orleans

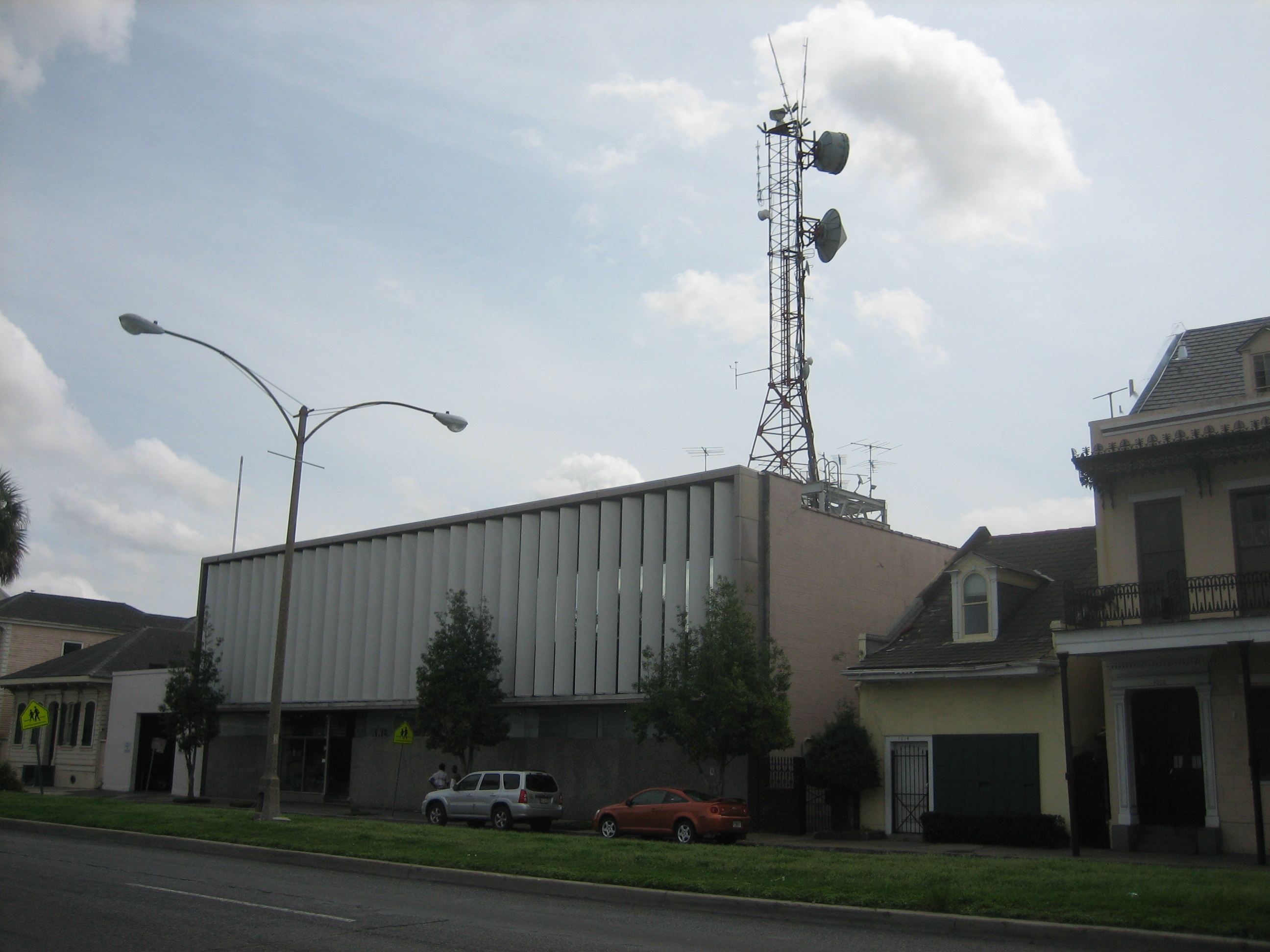
- WWL building on Rampart Street
- New Orleans, Louisiana; United States
- Channels: Digital: 27 (UHF); Virtual: 4
- Branding: WWL Louisiana

Programming
- Affiliations: 4.1: CBS; for others, see § Subchannels

Ownership
- Owner: Tegna Inc., a subsidiary of Nexstar Media Group; (WWL-TV, Inc.)
- Sister stations: WUPL; Nexstar: WGNO, WNOL-TV

History
- First air date: September 7, 1957
- Former channel numbers: Analog: 4 (VHF, 1957–2009); Digital: 36 (UHF, until 2020)
- Former affiliations: NTA Film Network (secondary, 1957–1961)
- Call sign meaning: "World Wide Loyola"

Technical information
- Licensing authority: FCC
- Facility ID: 74192
- ERP: 1,000 kW
- HAAT: 311 m (1,020 ft)
- Transmitter coordinates: 29°54′22.9″N 90°2′22.1″W

Links
- Public license information: Public file; LMS
- Website: www.wwltv.com

WWL-TV (channel 4) is a television station in New Orleans, Louisiana, United States, affiliated with CBS. It is owned by the Tegna subsidiary of Nexstar Media Group alongside WUPL (channel 54), an independent station with MyNetworkTV; Nexstar also owns ABC affiliate WGNO (channel 26) and CW station WNOL-TV (channel 38). WWL-TV and WUPL share studios on Rampart Street in the historic French Quarter; WWL-TV's transmitter is located on Cooper Road in Terrytown, Louisiana.

== History ==
=== Early history ===
The station first signed on the air on September 7, 1957. Coincidentally, it was the fourth television station (and the third commercial station) to sign on in the New Orleans media market, behind WDSU-TV (channel 6), WJMR-TV (channel 61, now WVUE-DT on channel 8) and non-commercial WYES-TV (channel 8, now on channel 12)—all signing on in under a timeframe of nine years. It was originally owned by Loyola University of the South (now Loyola University New Orleans; it was one of a very few handful of commercial TV stations owned by a university), which also owned radio station WWL (870 AM). WWL-TV has been an affiliate of the CBS television network since its inception, as WWL radio had been (and still is) an affiliate of the CBS Radio Network (later CBS News Radio) since 1935. Channel 4 competed head-to-head with NBC affiliate WDSU for first place during the 1960s and 1970s. However, after Edgar B. Stern Jr. sold WDSU to South Carolina-based Cosmos Broadcasting in 1972, it began deemphasizing local features in favor of its highly regarded newscasts. By comparison, WWL-TV, as the only locally owned station, heavily stressed its local roots. By the early 1980s, WWL-TV had emerged as the market's ratings leader.

In 1988, WWL-TV and Cox Cable, the major cable provider serving areas of Greater New Orleans located south of Lake Pontchartrain, entered into a joint venture to form a cable-only news channel called NewsWatch 15 (named after the cable slot on Cox where the channel is carried). It debuted on October 20, 1989. NewsWatch 15 was one of the first regional cable news channels in the United States at the time. The channel airs rebroadcasts and live simulcasts of local newscasts seen on WWL-TV, along with breaking news coverage that does not necessarily warrant extended coverage on channel 4.

In 1989, Loyola sold its media properties to different owners. WWL radio and its FM sister station, WLMG (101.5) were purchased by Keymarket Communications, while WWL-TV's employees formed a group called Rampart Broadcasting (named after the road, Rampart Street, where the station's studio facility is located). Led by general manager J. Michael Early and longtime news director and station editorialist Phil Johnson, the employees group bought the station, with the deal closing on August 27, 1990. It was the first (and thus far, only) time that an employee-investor group acquired a U.S. television station. (CHEK-TV in Victoria, British Columbia, Canada, was similarly acquired by an employee-led group in 2009, which narrowly prevented the station's shutdown.)

In 1990, WWL-TV began running one of the most successful station image campaigns in the United States with the debut of its "Spirit of Louisiana" promotions. The one-minute spots focus on the region's musical and cultural heritage, and also showcase life in southeastern Louisiana. Many of the ads in the campaign, which continues to this day, feature well-known area musicians and singers.

=== Belo ownership ===
The station's local ownership came to an end in 1994, when the station was bought by the Dallas-based Belo Corporation. That year, channel 4's status as the unofficial "home" station of the New Orleans Saints came to an end after CBS lost the broadcast rights to the National Football Conference television package to Fox in December 1993. WWL-TV had aired most of the Saints' games since the team's inception in 1966, when CBS was the broadcast rightsholder for the pre-merger NFL, and continued upon the merger of the American Football League and the National Football League in 1970 with CBS becoming the NFC rightsholder. After CBS lost the NFC broadcast rights, the Saints telecasts moved to then-Fox affiliate WNOL-TV (channel 38) for the 1994 and 1995 seasons, before moving again to WVUE-TV (channel 8) upon that station's switch from ABC to Fox in January 1996. Today, WWL-TV only carries select games televised by CBS, primarily those in which the Saints play host to an AFC opponent at the Caesars Superdome although NFL cross-flexing procedures established in 2014 now allow for road games or NFC home games to be carried by CBS. The station also aired the Saints' victory in Super Bowl XLIV. WWL also provided local coverage of five New Orleans hosted Super Bowls, including IV and VI which were played at local Tulane Stadium, as well as Super Bowls XII, XXIV, and XLVII which were played at the Superdome.

In 2005, Viacom—which owned UPN station WUPL-TV (channel 54, now a MyNetworkTV affiliate) at the time through its Paramount Stations Group subsidiary—had made an offer to acquire WWL-TV, which would have created a duopoly with WUPL and turned channel 4 into a CBS owned-and-operated station (Viacom owned CBS from its 1999 merger with the network, which ironically traces the former company's history back to its existence as a syndicator of CBS programming, until December 2005, when shared parent National Amusements decided to split Viacom and CBS into two separate companies; they would remerge in 2019). However, after Belo rejected Viacom's purchase offer for WWL, Viacom instead reached a deal to sell WUPL to Belo in July of that year for $14.5 million. The deal was slated to close by the end of 2005, but was placed on hold when Hurricane Katrina devastated the Greater New Orleans area in late August. As a result, on February 9, 2006, CBS filed a breach of contract lawsuit against the Belo Corporation over the failure to finalize the sale of WUPL to Belo. The litigation was later settled on February 26, 2007, with Belo announcing that it would complete its purchase of WUPL. The deal had already received Federal Communications Commission approval, and was finalized on February 26, 2007; Belo moved WUPL's operations into WWL's Rampart Street studio facility in mid-April 2007.

=== Hurricane Katrina ===
Two days prior to Hurricane Katrina's landfall, WWL-TV began 24-hour continuous coverage of the storm on August 27, 2005, from its Rampart Street facility. Following a meeting between chief meteorologist Carl Arredondo and then-news director Sandy Breland on enacting a plan to evacuate station staff, at 10:45 pm on August 28, the station moved its operations to the Manship School of Mass Communications at Louisiana State University in Baton Rouge—which had agreed the year prior to allow WWL to use the journalism school as a backup facility in the event that a major hurricane forced the station to evacuate from New Orleans. 20 employees were evacuated to the LSU campus, 20 more were moved to the transmitter site in Gretna and an additional 28 staffers remained at the Rampart Street facility (those staffers eventually evacuated to the Hyatt Regency Hotel as conditions worsened). LSU students and staff helped produce the telecast with WWL-TV staff in a "bare bones" fashion.

The station briefly returned to its Rampart Street studios in New Orleans on August 29 at 4 pm. Flooding forced the station to again move operations back to the LSU campus in Baton Rouge, as well as a foyer used as a makeshift studio at the Gretna transmitter site, which did not sustain significant damage as the facility—built in 2000—was constructed to withstand 140-mile-per-hour (230 km/h) winds with the transmitter building positioned 15 feet (4.6 m) above ground on concrete; the transmitter site was evacuated on August 30 due to looting concerns. WWL was the only New Orleans station that was able to provide coverage of the storm and its aftermath uninterrupted, as it relayed its signal via fiber optic relay and used a satellite truck loaned to the station by Houston sister KHOU-TV to provide live field reports and helicopters loaned from KHOU and Dallas sister station WFAA. Due to overcrowding with WWL and other Belo station staffers at the Manship School building, on September 1, the station moved operations again, this time to the studios of Louisiana Public Broadcasting station WLPB-TV in Baton Rouge. This provided WWL with a much larger facility and expanded its audience to include LPB's statewide network; the station's coverage was also carried by many PBS stations in Louisiana and Mississippi as well as by KHOU and WFAA. WWL's operations returned to New Orleans about six weeks later.

WWL-TV's extensive coverage of Hurricane Katrina earned the station its sixth Peabody Award in early April 2006, as well as a duPont–Columbia Award in 2007; it was also recounted in an episode of The Weather Channel documentary series Storm Stories.

=== Post-Katrina ===
After Hurricane Katrina, some of the station's most visible talent—including weekend anchor/reporter Josh McElveen and reporter Stephanie Riegel—left channel 4 to pursue other opportunities. Karen Swensen, who anchored the 10 pm newscast, also left WWL to work at Boston-based regional news channel New England Cable News; meteorologists David Bernard and John Gumm also left the station (Bernard was already scheduled to leave the station before the storm struck).

Following the storm, WWL-TV brought back a station editorial segment. Modeled after the editorials presented for many years until the 1990s by longtime news director and station manager Phil Johnson, editorials seen in the present day (which air during the station's 6 pm newscast on Tuesday nights) are read via script by WWL-TV political analyst Clancy Dubos, who discusses current political issues related to the post-Katrina redevelopment of New Orleans.

In 2004, WWL-TV and Belo announced plans to construct a new multimillion-dollar broadcasting facility for the station and WUPL at 700 Loyola Avenue in downtown New Orleans. The complex—to have been named the J. Michael Early Broadcast Center, after the station's former general manager—was originally scheduled to be completed in late 2007 or early 2008. Groundbreaking of the new facility occurred on July 25, 2005 (just over one month before Katrina hit on August 29); however, its construction has been delayed (as of recently, the site is still a parking lot). As a result, WWL-TV and WUPL will remain at the existing Rampart Street studio location for the foreseeable future. WWL-TV celebrated its 50th anniversary of broadcasting on September 7, 2007; it observed its 55th anniversary half a decade later, in 2012; its 60th in 2017, and its 65th in 2022.

=== Hurricane Gustav ===
The same agreement for the use of Louisiana Public Broadcasting's studio facilities and the simulcast on LPB's stations statewide that was enacted following Hurricane Katrina was also used for coverage of Hurricane Gustav, when the storm hit southern Louisiana in early September 2008.

WWL-TV's coverage also carried on the second digital subchannels of fellow Belo sister stations WFAA-TV in Dallas and KHOU-TV in Houston for the convenience of evacuees who relocated to Texas to avoid the storm.

=== Sale to the Gannett Company and Gannett-Tegna split ===
On June 13, 2013, the Gannett Company announced that it would acquire Belo's television properties, including WWL-TV and WUPL, for $1.5 billion. The sale received FCC approval on December 20, and was formally completed on December 23, 2013.

On June 29, 2015, Gannett split in two with one side specializing in print media and the other side specializing in broadcast and digital media. WWL-TV and WUPL were both retained by the latter company, named Tegna.

=== Sale to Nexstar ===
Nexstar Media Group, owner of WGNO (channel 26) and WNOL-TV, acquired Tegna in a deal announced in August 2025 and completed on March 19, 2026. As part of the transaction, Nexstar committed to the divestiture of WUPL within two years, along with five other stations, mostly in markets where the two companies combined held four TV station licenses.

== Programming ==
WWL-TV carries the majority of the CBS network schedule, although the station splits the CBS WKND block over two days (the first two hours of the block air on Saturday mornings, while the final hour airs on Sundays).

WWL-TV preempted moderate amounts of CBS programming from the 1960s to the 1980s—including most notably, programs that the network aired weekdays during the 9 am hour, as well as CBS' late night lineup, prior to the debut of Late Show with David Letterman in 1993. During the 1970s, WWL-TV preempted the last hour of the network's Saturday children's programming, between noon and 1 pm, with local programming. Prior to 2015, WWL-TV would air The Late Late Show on a half-hour delay at 12:07 am, with syndicated programming (including The Insider) filling the program's 11:37 pm network timeslot on weeknights. Since then, WWL-TV airs what is currently Funny You Should Ask in its current 11:37 pm slot following Comics Unleashed after the Late Show franchise ended its 33-year run in 2026.

On September 1, 1986, WWL-TV dropped the CBS Morning News and began airing a two-hour morning newscast from 6 to 8 am, along with then-CBS affiliate WAGA in Atlanta. It was the first New Orleans station whose morning newscast ran past 7 am, predating the launch of WVUE's morning newscast by about 15 years. WWL-TV's morning news was followed by Live with Regis and Kathie Lee. The station eventually expanded its weekday morning newscast, Eyewitness Morning News, into the 8 am hour. CBS reached agreements with other area stations to carry its morning shows: Cox Cable carried the program in the late 1980s using a microwave relay from WAFB, followed by short-lived then-independent station WCCL. LeSEA owned-and-operated station WHNO (channel 20) picked up This Morning in 1998; its successor, The Early Show, moved from WHNO to WUPL in January 2005. Despite preempting the weekday edition, WWL-TV did air the Saturday edition. On December 5, 2016, WWL-TV began carrying CBS This Morning (now CBS Mornings) weekdays for the entire two hours (likely due to a corporate mandate from Tegna to satisfy their CBS affiliation agreements), while WUPL now carries the 7–9 am block of Eyewitness Morning News.

=== News operation ===
WWL-TV presently broadcasts 27 hours of locally produced newscasts each week (with 4 1/2 hours each weekday, 2 1/2 hours on Saturdays and two hours on Sundays). In addition, the station produces the half-hour sports highlight and discussion program 4th Down on 4, which airs Sundays at 10:35 pm. The station also operates a Northshore bureau located on North Causeway Boulevard in suburban Mandeville.

The station implemented the Eyewitness News format on February 26, 1968, having rebranded its newscasts from the Evening News title it had been using for the previous two years. WWL-TV has been the top-rated station among the New Orleans market's local newscasts for nearly 30 years, according to Nielsen Media Research. During the November 2007 sweeps period, the first major ratings period in New Orleans reported to Nielsen since Hurricane Katrina, the results affirmed that WWL-TV continued to lead its nearest competitors, WDSU and WVUE, by a wide margin.

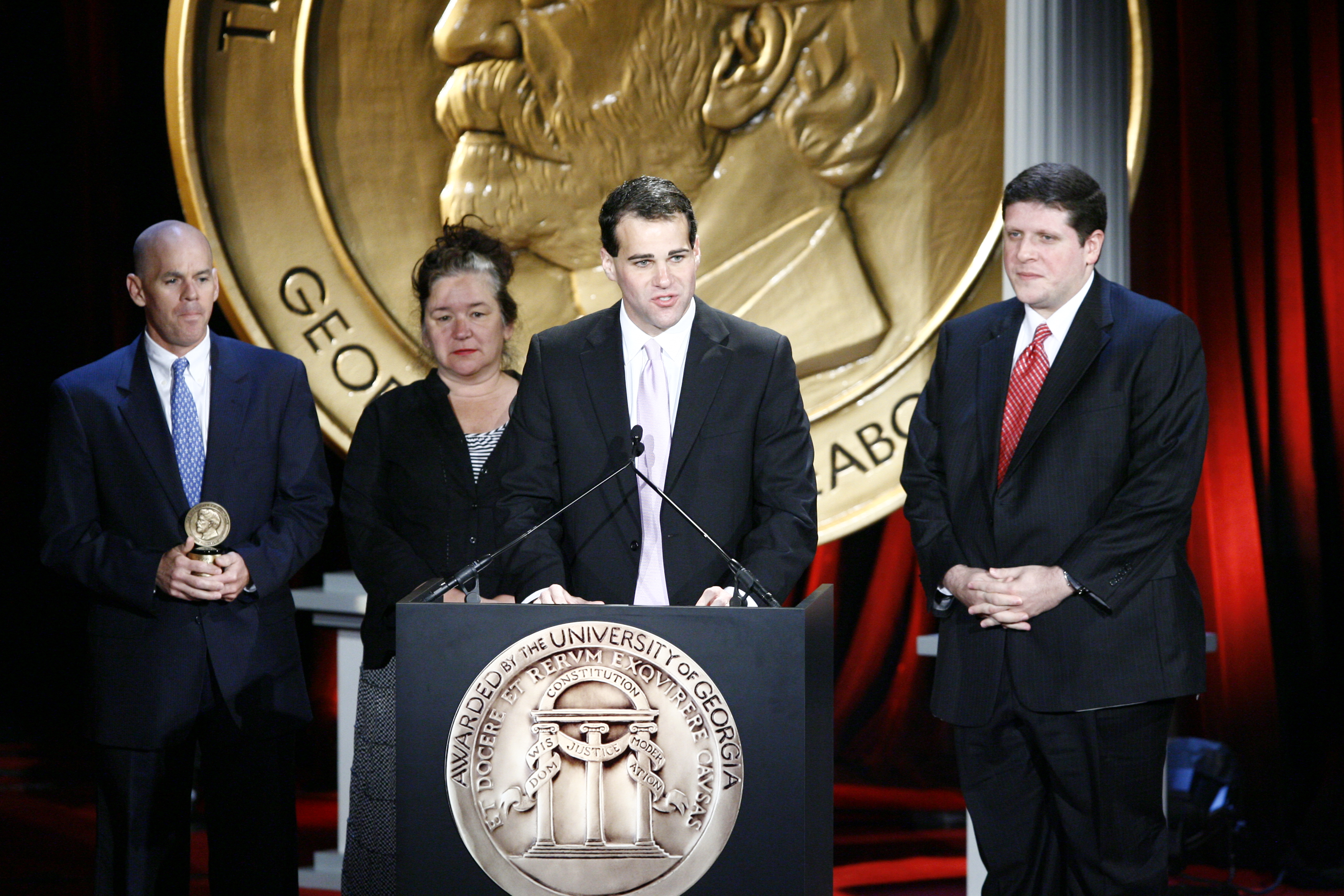
Tom Moore, Karen Gadbois, Lee Zurik and Dominic Massa accept an award for NOAH Housing Program Investigation at the 68th Annual Peabody Awards.

In March 2006, WWL-TV began producing a half-hour newscast called I-News, featuring more in-depth reporting on topics important to viewers. The program also featured live interviews with local, state and national officials. The newscast aired weekday evenings on the station's website, WWLTV.com, after its 6 pm newscast and was rebroadcast on channel 4. (The webcast has since been canceled.)

On June 4, 2007, WWL-TV began producing a half-hour prime time newscast each Monday through Friday evening at 9 pm for MyNetworkTV-affiliated sister station WUPL. Titled My54 Eyewitness News at 9, it was anchored by Lucy Bustamante and Mike Hoss—who also anchored the station's 10 pm newscast, Eyewitness News Nightwatch—until Bustamante departed WWL-TV for sister station WVEC in Norfolk on October 1, 2010. Bustamante was replaced by Karen Swensen—whom Bustamante replaced as evening co-anchor—as anchor of the 9 pm newscast on WUPL and the 10 pm newscast on channel 4 on February 24, 2011; in the interim, Hoss anchored the newscast on WUPL with a rotating series of co-anchors. The 9 pm newscast on WUPL was discontinued on April 26, 2013, as a result of consistently low ratings.

Since the anchor changes, WWL-TV has lost its significant ratings lead over WDSU, WVUE and WGNO, according to Nielsen Media reports, but its newscasts remain the highest-rated among the New Orleans market's news-producing stations. WWL-TV had once doubled the ratings of each of its competitors in every time period, but its lead gradually declined, reaching as close a margin as one household rating point ahead of second place WDSU (in the 6 pm time slot) during the July 2011 sweeps period. At 5 pm, WWL-TV led WDSU by only two ratings points, while claiming ratings wins in key demographics at both 5 and 6 pm—marking the first time in about 25 years that a station other than WWL-TV had placed first in the 25-54 demographic. At 10 pm, WWL-TV led WVUE by 1.9 ratings points. Newscasts in less competitive time periods of 4:30 am and 4 pm also scored wins in key demographic categories, as well as in household ratings.

In April 2010, WWL-TV became the second station in the market to install an HD-based weather system. Former WDSU morning anchor Melanie Hebert joined channel 4 in January 2012, however she did not appear on-air until that July due to a non-compete clause in her previous WDSU contract. (Hebert left WWL-TV in July 2013, after a year at the station.) In September 2010, WWL-TV began broadcasting its local newscasts in 16:9 widescreen standard definition; the WUPL newscast was included in the upgrade. Then WWL-TV switched to full HD on October 1, 2014. Presently, WGNO and WDSU continue to broadcast their local newscasts in widescreen SD rather than in true high definition; (the first news-producing station in the market to have upgraded their news production to HD was WVUE, which had broadcast its local news programming in the format since April 2007). On October 25, 2012, WWL-TV introduced a new state-of-the-art news set designed by FX Group that includes the station's first full-size weather center to be integrated with the main set (it replaced a set that debuted in 1997, which had been refreshed a few times during its lifespan).

On August 9, 2014, WWL-TV debuted hour-long weekend editions of its Eyewitness Morning News broadcasts on Saturdays at 8 am and Sundays at 6 am. On September 9, the station restored an evening newscast on WUPL's schedule with the debut of a half-hour 6:30 pm newscast on weeknights.

On January 26, 2026, WWL-TV debuted an hour-long 4 p.m. newscast on weekdays.

==== Notable former on-air staff ====
- Frank Davis – feature reporter (1981–2011; "In the Kitchen" and "Naturally N'Awlins" host)
- Bill Elder – anchor/investigative reporter (1966–2000; nicknamed the "Mike Wallace of Louisiana")
- Hap Glaudi – sports anchor (1961–1978)
- Jim Henderson – longtime Eyewitness Sports director (1978–2012; longtime radio play-by-play announcer for the New Orleans Saints)
- Angela Hill – anchor (1975–2013; retired as an anchor on April 4, 2013; now works for WWL-TV's special projects department)
- Hoda Kotb – anchor/reporter (1992–1997)
- Larry Matson – sports anchor (1981–1986)
- Jim Metcalf – anchor/reporter/host of A Sunday Journal (1966–1977)
- Chris Myers – sports reporter/anchor (1982–1986)
- Brad Panovich – weekend meteorologist (1999–2002)
- Nash Roberts – chief meteorologist (1978–1984)/weather consultant/hurricane analyst (1984–2001)
- Sally-Ann Roberts – anchor (1977–2018)
- Garland Robinette – anchor/reporter (1970–1990; married to co-anchor Angela Hill from 1978 to 1987)
- Norman Robinson – reporter (1979–1989)
- Charles Zewe – anchor/reporter (1971–1976)

== Technical information ==
=== Subchannels ===
The station's signal is multiplexed:

Subchannels of WWL-TV
| Subchannel | Res. | Short name | Programming |
|---|---|---|---|
| 4.1 | 1080i | WWL-HD | CBS |
| 4.2 | 480i | Crime | True Crime Network |
| 4.3 | 480i | NEST | The Nest |
| 4.4 | 480i | NOSEY | Nosey |
| 4.5 | 480i | GetTV | Great |
| 4.6 | 480i | DABL | Dabl |
| 4.7 | 480i | QVC2 | QVC2 |
| 4.8 | 480i | ShopLC | Shop LC |

On September 8, 2010, former owner Belo signed an agreement with the Disney–ABC Television Group to carry the Live Well Network on WWL-TV and four other stations (WFAA, KMOV in St. Louis, WVEC in Norfolk, Virginia, and WCNC-TV in Charlotte). The network began to be carried on digital subchannel 4.2 on November 8. After ABC announced the discontinuation of the Live Well Network in late 2014, WWL-DT2 (as well as other Tegna O&O stations) switched affiliations to the new Justice Network in 2015. In May 2016, Tegna launched Weigel's Decades network on WWL-DT3, which was later removed sometime in Q2 2023. Twist, Get, and Local Now were launched from mid-to-late quarter 2021. Only Get has since remained on the station's subchannels.

=== Analog-to-digital conversion ===
WWL-TV ended regular programming on its analog signal, over VHF channel 4, on June 12, 2009, the official date on which full-power television stations in the United States transitioned from analog to digital broadcasts under federal mandate. The station's digital signal continued to broadcast on its pre-transition UHF channel 36, using virtual channel 4.

As part of the SAFER Act, WWL-TV kept its analog signal on the air until July 12 to inform viewers of the digital television transition through a loop of public service announcements from the National Association of Broadcasters.

== See also ==
- List of three-letter broadcast call signs in the United States
