= Jim Metcalf =

American journalist

- Jim Metcalf reading one of his own books
- Born: May 11, 1920; Wichita Falls, Texas
- Died: March 8, 1977 (aged 56)
- Education: North Texas State University
- Occupation: Television Journalist
- Notable credit: A Sunday Journal
- Spouse: Mary Ann Metcalf
- Children: Marc, Michael, Jamie, Clare

James M. Metcalf (May 11, 1920 – March 8, 1977) was a journalist for WWL-TV in New Orleans, Louisiana where he served as anchor/reporter. He later became the host of A Sunday Journal from 1973 until his death from cancer in 1977, which was considered a "class act" in bringing ordinary people and their hobbies and interests to television. In 1975, Jim and his show were awarded the Peabody Award for "good writing, excellent photography, and artistic presentation."

The Jim Metcalf Memorial Award was created in his honor, and is bestowed by the Press Club of New Orleans annually.

He also wrote four volumes of poetry, one published posthumously, being described as "infatuated with words. He loved the language. He used it well."

== Works published ==
- Jim Metcalf's Journal (1974) ISBN 0-88289-035-2
- In Some Quiet Place (1975) ISBN 0-88289-088-3
- Please to Begin (1976) ISBN 0-88289-140-5
- Follow Another Star (1979) ISBN 0-88289-216-9
- Collected Poems (2000) ISBN 978-1-56554-701-8
