= Norman Robinson (journalist) =

American journalist (born 1951)

- Born: Norman Hollis Robinson; 1951 (age 74–75); Toomsuba, Mississippi, U.S.
- Occupation: Journalist
- Employer(s): WVUE-TV (1976-1978); WWL-TV (1979-1989); WDSU-TV (1990-2014)
- Known for: Questioning of David Duke in 1991 Louisiana gubernatorial election runoff debate

Norman Hollis Robinson (born 1951) is an American former journalist, known for his reporting in New Orleans and his questioning of David Duke during an infamous debate in the 1991 Louisiana gubernatorial election. He served as reporter for WVUE-TV from 1976 to 1978 and WWL-TV from February 1979 through July 1989, and later news anchor for WDSU-TV Channel 6 (NBC), where he worked in the news department from July 1990 until his retirement in May 2014.

== Career ==
Robinson was born in Toomsuba in Lauderdale County, Mississippi in 1951. After service as a musician in the United States Marine Corps, he began his career in broadcast journalism on radio in Southern California and then worked successively in television in Mobile, Alabama and New Orleans prior to being awarded a Nieman Fellowship to Harvard University. After completing the Nieman Fellowship he joined CBS Network News in New York, and the District of Columbia (where he served on the White House Press Corps for CBS) before moving back to New Orleans. Robinson is known for his tough straight forward interviewing skills. It was on the news program which Robinson anchors that New Orleans City Councilwoman Stacy Head was interviewed as she started posting her e-mails online during the height of the 2009 New Orleans e-mail controversy.

=== 1991 Louisiana gubernatorial debate ===
Robinson received significant national and international attention in 1991 when he questioned Louisiana gubernatorial candidate David Duke, a Republican State Representative and former Grand Wizard of the Knights of the Ku Klux Klan, during the state's runoff debate. Robinson, who is African-American, told Duke that he was "scared" at the prospect of Duke winning the election because of his history of "diabolical, evil, vile" racist and anti-Semitic comments, some of which he read to Duke. He then pressed Duke for an apology and when Duke protested that Robinson was not being fair to him, Robinson replied that he didn't think Duke was being honest. Jason Berry of the Los Angeles Times called it "startling TV" and the "catalyst" for the "overwhelming" turnout of black voters that helped former Governor Edwin Edwards defeat Duke.

== Personal life ==
In June 2008 Robinson was furloughed by WDSU after being arrested for driving while intoxicated but returned to work a month later. Robinson promised that he would never again drive while under the influence of alcohol. In an April 2009 testimony concerning the role of the United States Army Corps of Engineers in the Mississippi River Gulf Outlet, Robinson said that post-Katrina trauma, including loss of his home:

I ended up going to a psychologist because I wanted to commit suicide, and I ended up in a drunken stupor most of the time.

He is a member of Golden Key International Honour Society and a deacon at Central St. Matthew United Church of Christ in New Orleans.
