= Carley Ann McCord =

American sports reporter (1989–2019)

Carley McCord
- Born: Carley Ann McCord; July 24, 1989; Baton Rouge, Louisiana, U.S.
- Died: December 28, 2019 (aged 30); Lafayette, Louisiana, U.S.
- Education: Northwestern State University (BA); Louisiana State University
- Occupation: Sports journalist

Carley Ann McCord (July 24, 1989 – December 28, 2019) was an American sports reporter.

== Early life ==
McCord was born and raised in Baton Rouge, Louisiana. She attended St. Michael the Archangel High School and graduated from Northwestern State University and later Louisiana State University. She competed in the Miss Louisiana pageant from 2009 to 2013 placing first runner-up in 2012 and 2013.

== Broadcasting career ==
McCord began her broadcasting career in Cleveland as an in-house reporter for the Cleveland Browns and subsequently joined the morning show team at CBS Radio Cleveland plus also a host at Hot AC station WQAL. However, she later made several disparaging remarks about the city. After moving back to Louisiana, she freelanced for Cox Sports Television, ESPN3, and WDSU. Additionally, she served as a digital media reporter for the Louisiana Sports Hall of Fame and as the in-game host for both the New Orleans Pelicans and the New Orleans Saints.

== Death ==
On December 28, 2019, McCord was one of five passengers killed, shortly after take-off, aboard a small plane that crashed in a field one mile from the Lafayette Regional Airport. A lone survivor was listed in critical condition. McCord was traveling to cover the Peach Bowl for WDSU; her father-in-law, Steve Ensminger, happened to be the offensive coordinator and quarterbacks coach for the LSU Tigers football team playing in the game. She was 30 years old.
