= Bernard Diliberto =

Broadcast sports journalist

Bernard Saverio Diliberto, Jr., a.k.a. "Buddy" and/or "Buddy D" (August 18, 1931 – January 7, 2005) was a sports commentator in New Orleans for over 50 years. Buddy earned a Purple Heart for sustaining shrapnel wounds in the Korean War, during which he was a correspondent for Stars and Stripes. He got his start as a sportswriter at The Times-Picayune while attending Loyola University in 1950, eventually becoming the newspaper's daily sports columnist in his last two years of his stint there. His sportscasting career began at WVUE-TV in April 1966, where he remained as its sports director/anchor until he switched to WDSU-TV in March 1981, becoming sports director/anchor at that station for 9 years. WDSU-TV had previously been dominated by sportscaster Wayne Mack in this television market.

Buddy D was either loved or hated. For the New Orleans Saints fans, Buddy was a caricature of all their hopes and the team's inadequacies. He hosted a daily sports talk show on WWL radio in New Orleans after years as the sports anchors on two different local news shows. If he thought the comments were ridiculous, he was apt to refer to the caller as a "squirrel." He succeeded noted sportscaster Hap Glaudi as host of this WWL (AM) radio show.

His ardent fans, such as "Abdul D. Tentmakur" and "Dr. Kevorkian" were as colorful as the host. In later years he would also read a halftime editorial during each Saints game. He campaigned for Mike Ditka to get the head coaching job after Jim Mora left. Buddy was the originator of the "Aints" in 1980 (and the paper bag over the head) as the team went 1–15 and also memorably characterized the despair of the typical Saints fan with the quip "When you go to Heaven after you die, tell St. Peter you're a Saints fan. He'll say, 'C'mon in, I don't care what else you done, you suffered enough.'"

During the week of Super Bowl XX, which was held in New Orleans, Diliberto reported that Chicago Bears quarterback Jim McMahon had referred to the women of the city as "sluts" and the men as "idiots", which sparked controversy in New Orleans. McMahon later denied the statement by saying that he was a late sleeper and would not have been up early enough on the day in question to make the comment. Diliberto apologized and was temporarily suspended from WDSU as a result.

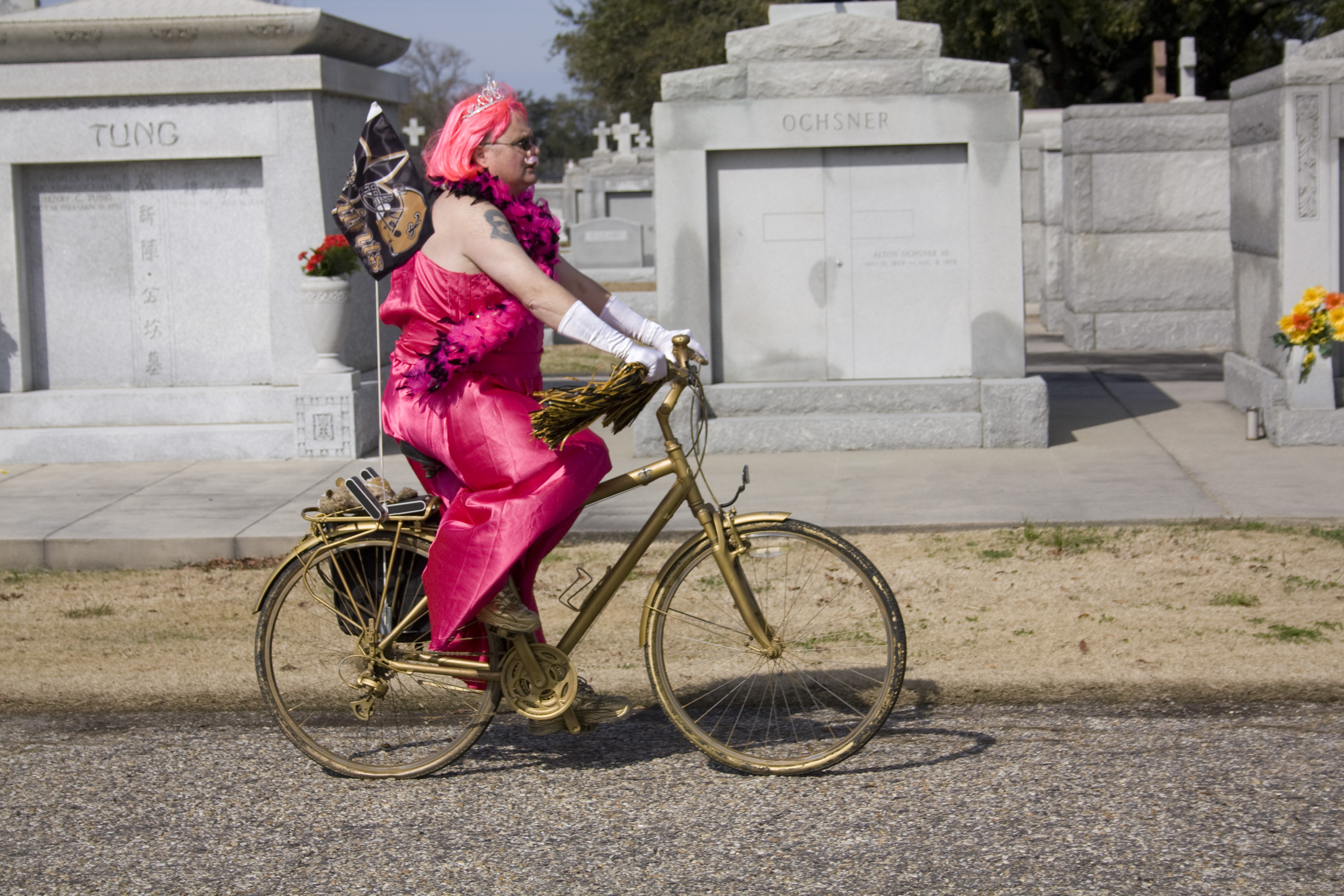
Fan visitation of the tomb of Buddy D following the Super Bowl Victory by the New Orleans Saints professional football team

Buddy D vowed after years of frustration to wear a dress and walk down the middle of Bourbon Street if the New Orleans Saints ever made it to the Super Bowl.

Buddy D suffered a massive heart attack and died on January 7, 2005. He is remembered by "Abdul D. Tentmakur", a former caller of Buddy's in numerous Mardi Gras parades with a memoriam on the front of the float carrying his band. Few sportscasters have ever had such an impact or such a following in such a relatively small local market. In the wake of the Saints recent success, he has often been referred to by many as the "patron Saint" of New Orleans and the New Orleans Saints.

== Tributes to Buddy Diliberto ==
In 2007, New Orleans composer Jep Epstein wrote and recorded a song titled Heaven's 'Bout To Make The News. The song referenced a promise Buddy D made to his radio listeners that if the New Orleans Saints ever played in the Super Bowl, he would put on a dress and parade down Bourbon Street. The song gained a wider audience among Saint's fans in 2009, which marked the team's best start in a season in its franchise history. His successor at WWL, former Saints quarterback Bobby Hebert, promised to fulfill Buddy D's vow.

On January 25, 2010, the New Orleans Times-Picayune, with his family's blessing, published an altered photograph of Buddy D in a dress to celebrate the New Orleans Saints' first NFC Championship and subsequent trip to the Super Bowl.

On Sunday, January 31, 2010, Buddy D was honored with a parade of tens of thousands of men in dresses led by Bobby Hebert from the Superdome to the French Quarter ending on Bourbon Street to celebrate the Saints' first trip to the Super Bowl. Over 87,000 people were in attendance. The Saints would win Super Bowl XLIV over the Indianapolis Colts 31-17.

In reference to his Super Bowl promise, a picture of Buddy D wearing a dress was posted in an edition of the Times-Picayune, shortly after the Saint's Super Bowl victory.

New Orleans radio and tv show host, Kaare Johnson, who worked with Buddy for several years in talkradio, broadcasts his daily show from the “Buddy Diliberto Studios”.
