= WVUE-DT =

Television station in New Orleans

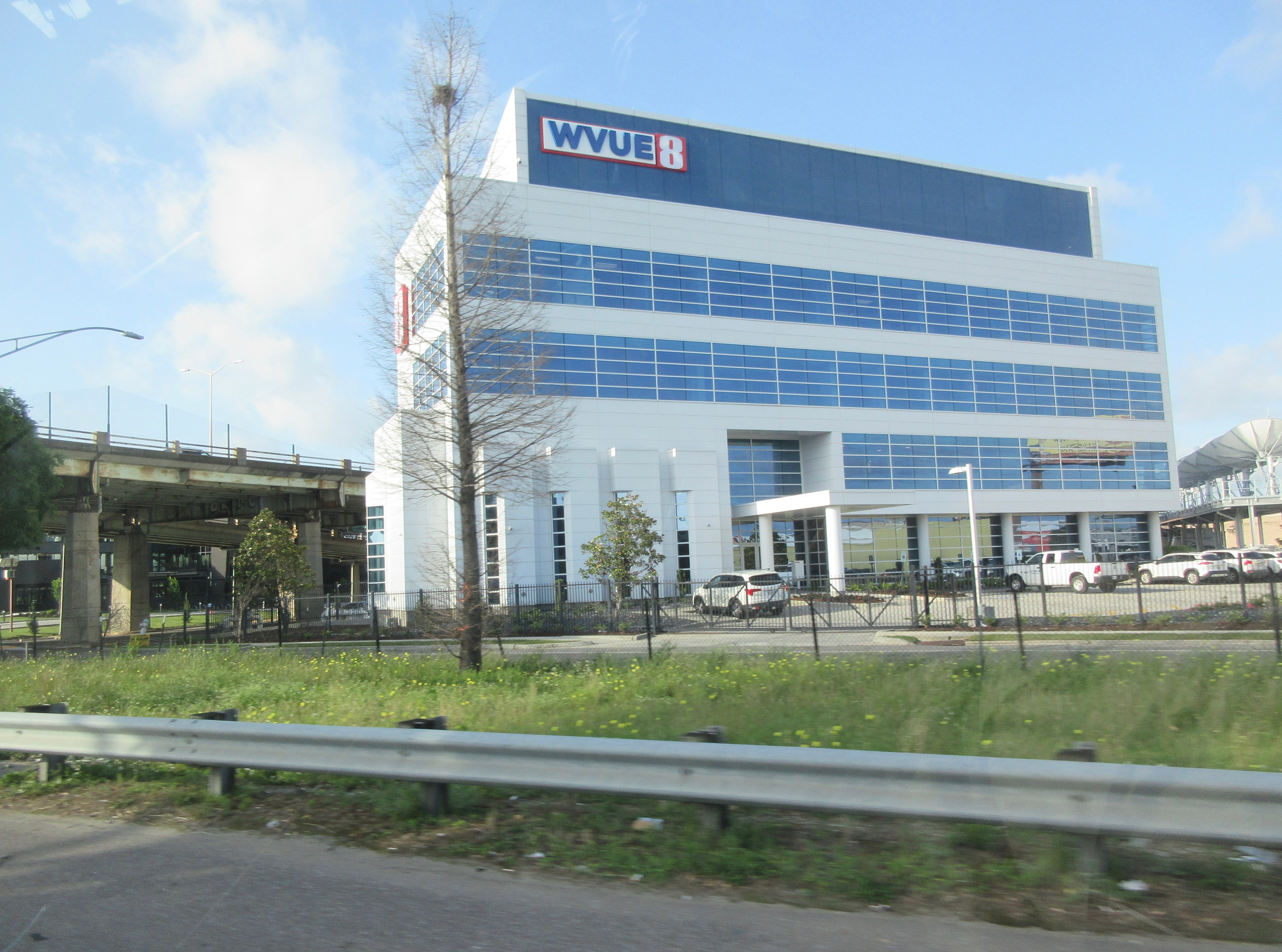
- WVUE-DT's studios on Howard Avenue in New Orleans
- New Orleans, Louisiana; United States
- Channels: Digital: 29 (UHF); Virtual: 8
- Branding: Fox 8

Programming
- Affiliations: 8.1: Fox; for others, see § Subchannels

Ownership
- Owner: Gray Media; (Gray Television Licensee, LLC)

History
- First air date: November 1, 1953
- Former call signs: WJMR-TV (1953–1959); WVUE (1959–2009)
- Former channel numbers: Analog: 61 (UHF, 1953–1956), 20 (UHF, 1956–1959), 13 (VHF, 1959–1962), 12 (VHF, 1962–1970), 8 (VHF, 1970–2009); Digital: 8 (VHF, 2008–2010)
- Former affiliations: CBS (1953–1957); ABC (secondary 1953–1957, primary 1957–1996)
- Call sign meaning: Vue is the French word for "view"

Technical information
- Licensing authority: FCC
- Facility ID: 4149
- ERP: 850 kW
- HAAT: 290 m (951 ft)
- Transmitter coordinates: 29°57′14.9″N 89°56′58.3″W
- Translator(s): W30EZ-D Slidell

Links
- Public license information: Public file; LMS
- Website: www.fox8live.com

WVUE-DT (channel 8) is a television station in New Orleans, Louisiana, United States, affiliated with the Fox network. Owned by Gray Media, the station maintains primary studios on Howard Avenue in New Orleans, with a secondary studio within the Benson Tower downtown; its transmitter is located on Magistrate Street in Chalmette, Louisiana.

== History ==
=== Early years with ABC and CBS ===
The station first signed on the air on November 1, 1953, as WJMR-TV. Founded by Supreme Broadcasting Co., a locally based company run by lawyer Chester F. Owens (who served as the company's president), it was the second television station in the New Orleans market, signing on six years after WDSU-TV, and the third in Louisiana only seven months after Baton Rouge's WAFB. Originally broadcasting on UHF channel 61, it was moved to channel 20 on July 20, 1955. It originally operated as a primary CBS affiliate, while splitting ABC programming in off-hours with WDSU-TV. During 1957 and 1958, WJMR-TV had simulcast its signal on VHF channel 12, using the call sign KK2XFW. When WWL-TV (channel 4) signed on in September 1957, WWL took over the CBS affiliation because of WWL radio's longtime affiliation with the CBS Radio Network, allowing WJMR to upgrade its ABC affiliation to full-time.

The station moved to VHF channel 13 on January 13, 1959, and subsequently changed its call letters to WVUE on February 1. The station moved to channel 12 on September 6, 1962, to accommodate Biloxi, Mississippi, ABC affiliate WLOX onto channel 13, which would launch the following month. Screen Gems, the television arm of Columbia Pictures, acquired the station from Supreme Broadcasting in 1965. On June 8, 1970, at 8 p.m., it made a highly publicized switch of channel positions with the city's PBS member station, WYES-TV, and moved to VHF channel 8, during an airing of the 1954 movie The Naked Jungle. This was done to give WVUE a greater broadcast signal range; while on channel 12, it had operated at relatively low power to avoid interfering with the signal of Jackson, Mississippi's WJTV, which had also broadcast on channel 12. The channel 61 allocation was later assigned to WLPN-LP (which operated from 1989 to the late 2000s) and the channel 20 allocation was assigned to religious station WHNO (which signed on in October 1994).

1970–79 WVUE logo.

Columbia Pictures sold WVUE to Oklahoma City–based Gaylord Broadcasting Company in 1977. In March 1983, A. H. Belo Corporation announced its intention to acquire the station; no formal sale agreement was reached, and by May the deal was off (Belo would go on to acquire WWL-TV in 1994 and WUPL in 2007). WVUE started broadcasting 24 hours a day in June 1986, becoming the last commercial television station in New Orleans to transition to a round-the-clock schedule. When Gaylord Broadcasting began a gradual paring down of its station group in 1987 (which would not be completed until 1999), WVUE was sold to the Burnham Broadcasting Company.

=== Fox affiliation ===
On December 18, 1993, the Fox Broadcasting Company outbid CBS for the rights to the NFL's National Football Conference television package. In March 1994, Fox partnered with minority-owned communications firm Savoy Pictures (which would serve as majority partner) to form SF Broadcasting. On August 25, 1994, the company bought WVUE, WALA-TV in Mobile, Alabama, and KHON-TV in Honolulu, Hawaii, for $229 million; fellow sister station WLUK-TV in Green Bay, Wisconsin, was sold to the company one month earlier in a separate $38 million deal, which for a time, was challenged by an FCC petition filed by NBC alleging that the deal violated foreign investment limits for U.S. broadcasters (the only Burnham station exempted from the deal was KBAK-TV in Bakersfield, California, which was spun off to Westwind Communications, a company founded by several former Burnham executives). As part of the deal, Fox signed a long-term agreement, in which the network would affiliate with SF's four "Big Three" network affiliates, beginning in the fall of 1995. Fox originally planned to own a minority voting stock in SF Broadcasting; however, in 1995, Fox opted against holding a voting interest (which would have resulted in the stations being counted against the FCC's station ownership total), although it would retain an ownership stake. The transaction was completed in the summer of 1995.

WVUE-TV affiliated with Fox on January 1, 1996, ending its 43-year affiliation with ABC, which moved to WGNO (channel 26); New Orleans's original Fox affiliate, WNOL-TV (channel 38), took WGNO's former WB affiliation (that network had been affiliated with WGNO for just shy of a year prior to the switch, due to that station's owner, Tribune Broadcasting's partial ownership interest in The WB). Of the former Burnham stations that switched to Fox, WVUE was the only one involved in the deal that was an ABC affiliate: WALA, WLUK, and KHON had previously been affiliated with NBC.

Because of Fox's acquisition of television rights to the National Football Conference, the switch resulted in channel 8 becoming the unofficial "home" station for the New Orleans Saints, carrying many of the team's Sunday afternoon road games. WWL-TV had aired most of the Saints' games beginning in 1970, when CBS assumed rights to the NFC upon the merger of the American Football League and the National Football League; when CBS lost the NFC broadcast rights to Fox in 1994, the Saints telecasts resided on WNOL-TV for the following two years. In addition to WVUE, the team's regular season games televised over-the-air locally are split primarily between WWL-TV (for select games televised by CBS in which the Saints play against an AFC opponent; CBS also had the rights to the Saints' lone Super Bowl appearance), WGNO (through over-the-air rights to the Amazon Prime Video's Thursday Night Football package), WDSU (through NBC's rights to Sunday prime time and select playoff games as well as its local broadcast rights to Monday Night Football contests during occasions when a game involving the Saints is scheduled) and preseason games (which, as of 2019, are produced by Gray's sports division Raycom Sports). WVUE also gave local coverage to two Super Bowls, XXXVI and XXXI, both of which were held at what is now the Caesars Superdome.

On November 28, 1995, one month before WVUE affiliated with Fox, Silver King Communications (operated by former Fox executive Barry Diller) announced that it would acquire Savoy Pictures; at the time of the purchase, Silver King's existing stations had mainly been affiliates of the Home Shopping Network (both Silver King and HSN were later acquired by USA Networks). The sale of WVUE and the other SF stations was approved and finalized in March 1996, with its other assets being merged into the company that November. On April 1, 1998, Silver King subsequently sold the stations to Emmis Communications for $307 million in cash and stock, as part of a sale of its major network affiliates in order to concentrate on its formerly HSN-affiliated independent stations. On May 15, 2005, Emmis Communications announced that it would sell its 16 television stations, including WVUE, in order to concentrate on its radio properties.

=== Hurricane Katrina ===
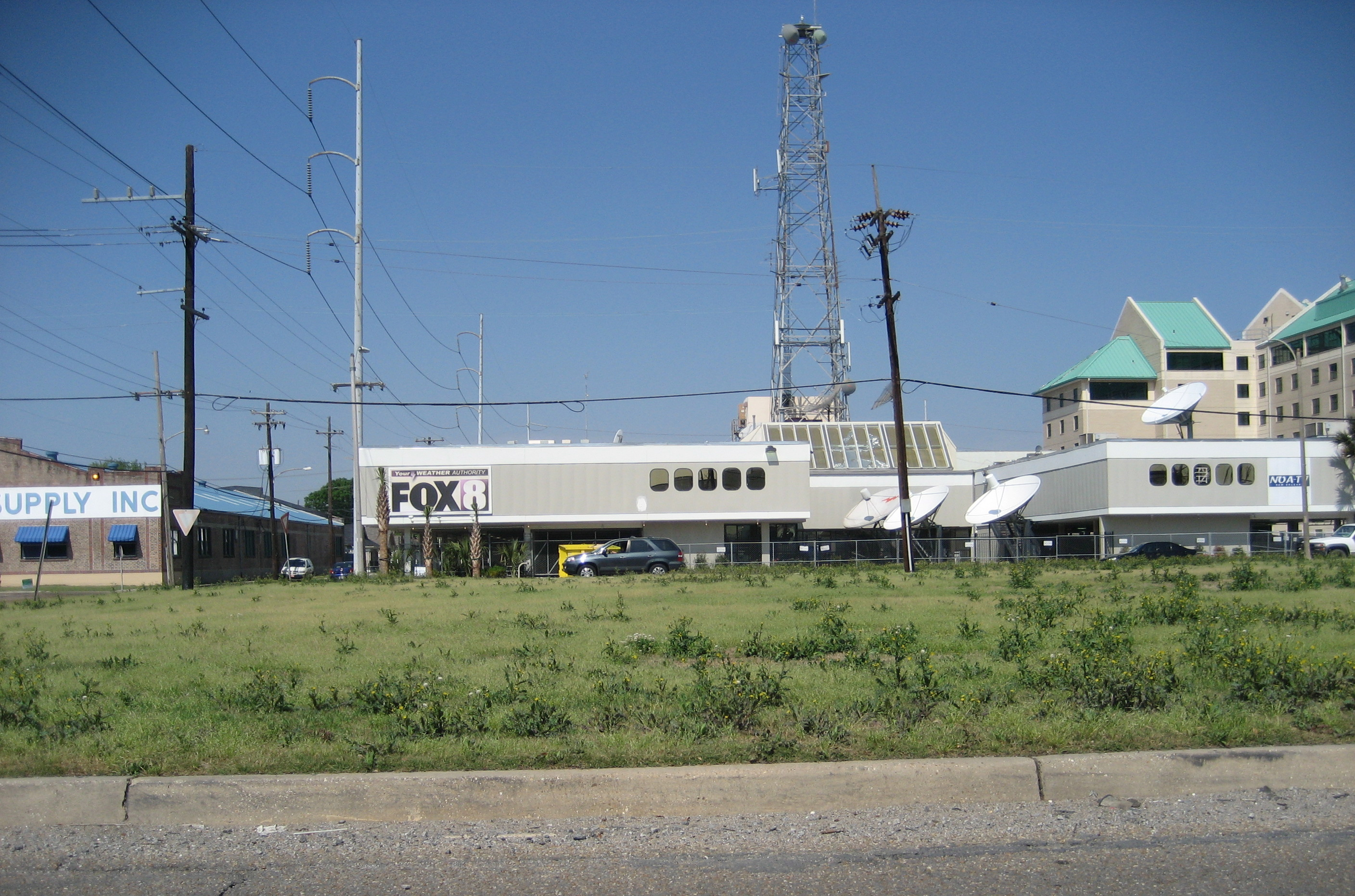
WVUE's studio, March 2007.

After Hurricane Katrina struck Greater New Orleans on August 29, 2005, WVUE temporarily moved its operations to the studios of sister station WALA-TV in Mobile, Alabama. WVUE's facility on Norman C. Francis Parkway (Jefferson Davis Parkway before 2020) is located in a low-lying part of New Orleans that was badly flooded due to the levee failures caused by Katrina. The damage that was caused to the building was so severe that Emmis released much of the station's on-air staff from their non-compete clauses, allowing them to seek employment outside of the market without penalty. Soon, meteorologist Crystal Wicker left for Indianapolis ABC affiliate WRTV, where she began work on October 3. Weekend meteorologist Jeff Baskin went to Portland, Oregon's KOIN-TV; reporter Summer Jackson went to Chicago to work at CLTV, while reporter Kerry Cavanaugh took a job at WBAL-TV in Baltimore.

Following the storm, WVUE presented a rotating 15-minute newscast that was streamed on its website and was produced out of WALA's studios, slowly restoring the station's regular schedule as developments faded and reconstruction on WVUE's news operations continued. WVUE later resumed its over-the-air broadcasts from a low-power transmitter as an alternate site, which provided a reduced signal that did not reach most of the market; the station's analog signal was upgraded to full power on September 19, 2005, from its transmitter facility in Chalmette, which had flooded during the storm. In mid-June 2006, construction of the station's permanent news set and weather center was completed. Before then, a temporary news set and newsroom were set up in the station's production room. Station manager Vanessa Oubre said that remodeling/reconstruction of the rest of the building was expected to be completed by November 2006. The sale of the station was also affected and was delayed for two years because of the rebuilding; Emmis had intended to divest all its television assets by the start of 2007, but retained ownership of WVUE in the interim until a buyer was found.

=== Purchase by Tom Benson ===
On May 5, 2008, Emmis Communications announced an agreement to sell the station to the Louisiana Media Company, a media group founded by Tom Benson (owner of the city's two major league sports franchises, the NFL's New Orleans Saints and the NBA's New Orleans Pelicans) for $41 million. Benson stated that he planned for the new company to acquire several radio and television stations nationwide and to be involved in movie production. The FCC approved the sale on July 14, 2008, with the transfer being finalized four days later on July 18. In August 2012, WVUE opened a secondary studio facility (branded as the "Window on New Orleans") on the second floor of the Benson Tower in downtown New Orleans (overlooking Champions Square and the Mercedes-Benz Superdome) that was utilized for the station's weekday morning newscast and for coverage of sports events. When Hurricane Isaac struck the area in August 2012, the station provided a web stream of the station's storm coverage to Shreveport ABC affiliate KTBS-TV, which carried WVUE's stream over digital subchannel 3.3, to provide information for area evacuees who relocated to the Ark-La-Tex region.

=== SSA with and eventual outright sale to Raycom ===
In October 2013, Retirement Systems of Alabama (RSA) stated in its newsletter, The Advisor, that Raycom Media (a company which RSA invested in), would purchase WVUE for $55.6 million. A spokesperson for Tom Benson called The Advisor item "inaccurate" and that the station was not for sale; RSA CEO David Brenner called the report a "mistake". However, on November 20, 2013, Raycom announced that it would begin operating WVUE under a shared services agreement (SSA) to take effect on December 16; under the agreement, Benson remained WVUE's owner and retained the station's license, but most of WVUE's staff became Raycom employees; Louisiana Media president Joe Cook, who relinquished his additional duties as the station's general manager, commented that the deal would allow WVUE to benefit from the regional presence that Raycom provided; the Alabama-based station group had a well-established presence in the Southeastern U.S., including ownership of three other stations in Louisiana (in Baton Rouge, Lake Charles and Shreveport). Upon the takeover, former WWL-TV news director Sandy Breland was appointed as WVUE's vice president and general manager, joining other WWL and Belo alumni among its staff.

The partnership stemmed from a near-acquisition of the station by Raycom, which had been one of several companies to make offers for the station. However, Benson was not prepared to sell WVUE completely, leading to the negotiation of the SSA. Raycom president Paul McTear also noted that the story in The Advisor was the result of human error, and that there was not a deal to acquire the station. Benson had considered expanding his broadcast holdings into other nearby markets, but noticed that Raycom had a presence in all of the markets he considered.

On February 6, 2017, Louisiana Media Company exercised the option to sell WVUE's license assets to Raycom. Two months later on April 4, Raycom formally announced that it would purchase WVUE from the Louisiana Media Company for $51.8 million. Benson would continue to retain a stake in WVUE. Raycom management and Benson finalized the sale on August 8. Benson died several months later, on March 15, 2018; the Benson estate continued to maintain the minority stake in WVUE.

=== Sale to Gray Television ===
On June 25, 2018, less than a year after the full acquisition of WVUE by Raycom, Atlanta-based Gray Television announced it had reached an agreement with Raycom to merge their respective broadcasting assets (consisting of Raycom's 63 existing owned-and/or-operated television stations, including WVUE, and Gray's 93 television stations) under the former's corporate umbrella. The cash-and-stock merger transaction valued at $3.6 billion–in which Gray shareholders would acquire preferred stock currently held by Raycom–resulted in WVUE gaining new sister stations in nearby markets, including CBS/ABC affiliate KNOE-TV in Monroe and NBC/CBS affiliate KALB-TV in Alexandria, in addition to its current Raycom sister stations. The combined company is in every Louisiana market except for Lafayette as a result. The sale was approved on December 20, and was completed on January 2, 2019.

In December 2023, WVUE announced it had purchased a four-story, 37,000-square-foot (3,400 m^{2}) building at 3900 Howard Avenue that then housed Pontchartrain Housing Corporation. The station announced plans to "create a state-of-the-art digital television media center" at the new property in time for the NFL's Super Bowl LIX, an event in February 2025 that Caesars Superdome hosted and Fox and WVUE broadcast. The station's original home at 1025 S. Norman C. Francis Parkway, just seven blocks away, was acquired by the neighboring Xavier University of Louisiana as part of an expansion of the school's programs.

On December 30, 2023, Gray reached an agreement with the New Orleans Pelicans to air 10 games on the station during the 2023–24 season. On August 6, 2024, it was reported that the Pelicans had signed a multi-year agreement to move all of its regionally-televised games to WVUE beginning in the 2024–25 season, moving from Bally Sports New Orleans. On September 17, Gray announced the formation of the Gulf Coast Sports & Entertainment Network, which would be on a new subchannel of WVUE.

== Programming ==
WVUE-DT currently carries the majority of the Fox network schedule, though like most news-heavy Fox stations, it delays the network's Saturday late night hour by a half-hour due to a 10 p.m. newscast. Channel 8 has aired Fox's prime time, late night, news, children's and sports programming since it joined the network in January 1996; the only regular exception has been Fox NFL Kickoff, which WVUE has declined carriage of since the Sunday pre-game show and Fox NFL Sunday lead-in moved to Fox from Fox Sports 1 in September 2015, due to its existing commitment to carry the "official" New Orleans Saints pregame show Saints Pre Game Live on Sunday mornings during the NFL regular season (the program is not carried at all in the New Orleans market, as Fox has not secured a substitute outlet among the market's minor network affiliates—either CW owned-and-operated station WNOL-TV (channel 38) or MyNetworkTV affiliate WUPL (channel 54)—to carry Fox NFL Kickoff).

Throughout the 1970s and 1980s, the station consistently ranked at a distant third place in the ratings behind WWL-TV and WDSU-TV, even as ABC topped the national ratings for a time in the mid-1970s. One of the primary reasons for WVUE's third-place position was the station's heavy preemptions of network programs. For example, during much of the 1970s, WVUE preempted portions of ABC's daytime soap opera lineup and aired westerns, cartoons and off-network sitcoms in their place. Additionally, WVUE did not carry many of the network's Saturday morning cartoons, as well as American Bandstand. WVUE also preempted ABC's late night programming, which prior to the 1979 debut of Nightline, consisted of movies and reruns of prime time series. Viewers in the New Orleans market that wanted to see most of ABC's full schedule could watch the network's other affiliates in surrounding markets: WRBT and later WBRZ from Baton Rouge, west of New Orleans, to WLOX from Biloxi, to the east, or to WAPT from Jackson, to the north. Under Gaylord's ownership, WVUE reinstated ABC's entire lineup of daytime soaps to its schedule in the fall of 1978. In spite of ownership changes and programming modifications, WVUE was still unable to improve its standing in the ratings and largely would not until it became a Fox affiliate.

Unlike the New World Communications-owned stations that joined Fox around the same timeframe, the Savoy stations, including WVUE, carried Fox's children's programming on weekday mornings and afternoons as well as on Saturday mornings; the network later discontinued the Fox Kids weekday blocks in 2002, with the Saturday morning lineup remaining until its successor 4Kids TV ended in December 2008. Ratings for Fox's programming had increased slightly from when the network was affiliated with WNOL; however, viewership for WVUE's newscasts remained well behind that of WWL-TV and WDSU. The station acquired additional syndicated talk shows to fill certain daytime slots where ABC programming formerly aired.

Beginning under Emmis, WVUE strengthened its syndicated programming inventory, including acquiring the local syndication rights to Wheel of Fortune and Jeopardy! as part of a group deal with Emmis' Fox affiliates, a rarity for a Fox station (prior to airing on channel 8, the two shows aired for about two decades on WWL-TV).

=== News operation ===
WVUE-DT presently broadcasts 57 hours of locally produced newscasts each week (with 10 hours each weekday and 3 1/2 hours each on Saturdays and Sundays); in regards to the number of hours devoted to news programming, it is the highest local newscast output of any television station in the New Orleans market and within the state of Louisiana. WVUE is the only station in the market that airs a local newscast at 5:30 p.m., although it does not run a newscast at 6 p.m. on weeknights. In addition, the station produces the sports discussion program The Final Play, which airs Sundays at 10:30 p.m. The station also originates the host segments and some stories for Gray's national newsmagazine, Investigate TV+, which is anchored by WVUE anchors Lee Zurik and Tisha Powell and is in daily broadcast syndication.

The station had been an also-ran among the New Orleans market's television news outlets for many years; however, the station hired many well-known talent during the 1960s through the 1980s (some of whom had previously worked at WDSU and WWL-TV) including anchor Alec Gifford, weatherman Nash Roberts and sports anchor Buddy Diliberto. In 1968, Gifford—then the station's news director—hired Furnell Chatman as a general assignment reporter at WVUE, becoming the first African American reporter in the market; Chatman eventually made history as the first African American to anchor a newscast in Louisiana when he was appointed anchor of the station's noon newscast a few years later. In 1976, WVUE hired Lynn Gansar, who within a few years, was elevated from a reporter role to become the station's first female news anchor. On May 31, 1982, WVUE launched a half-hour 5 p.m. newscast called Live At Five; this program was revamped as Neighbors at Five during the late 1980s, in which anchors Margaret Dubuisson and Joe Giardina presented the newscast from various locations in New Orleans.

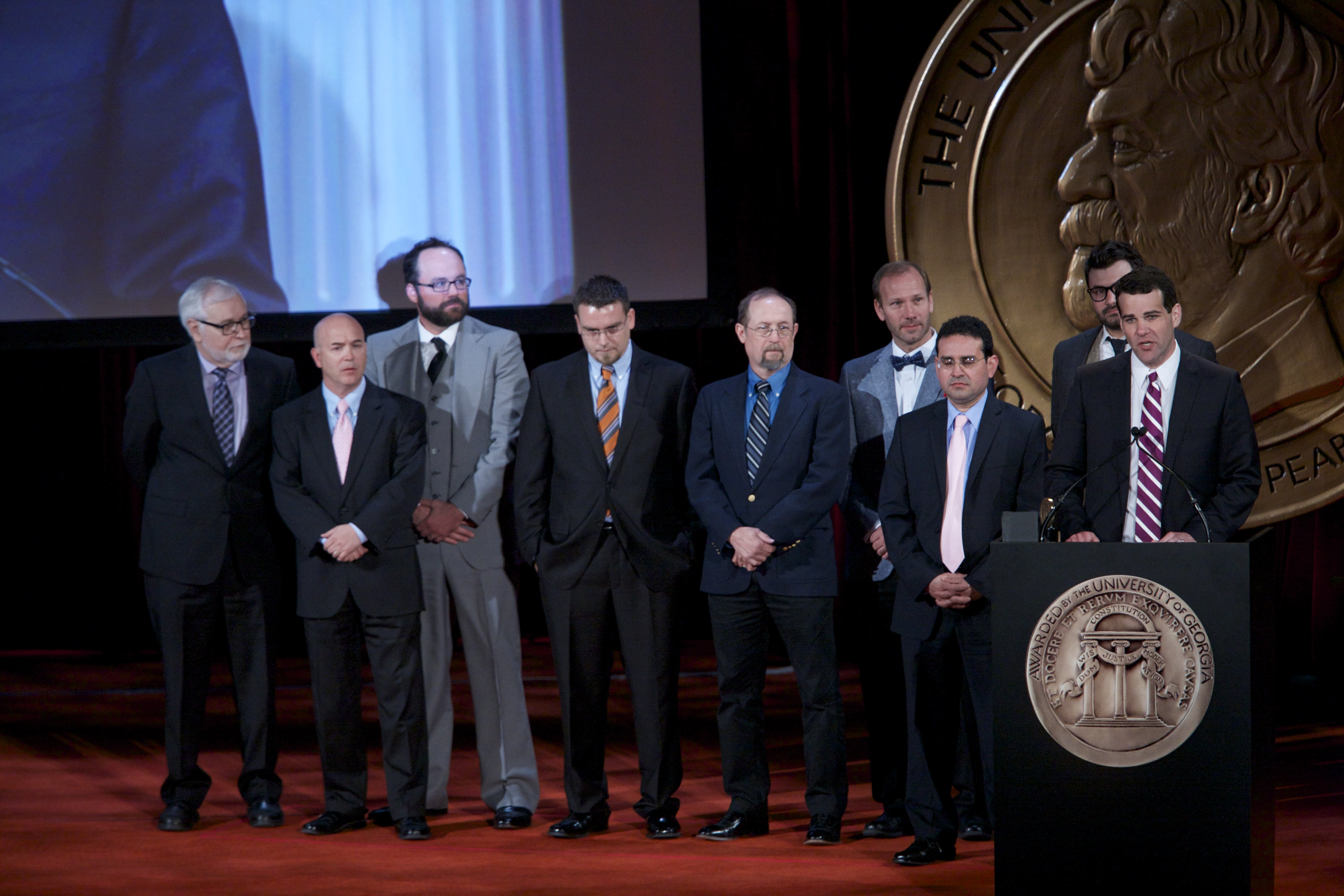
Lee Zurik accepts the Peabody Award for "Louisiana Purchased." He is joined on stage by the WVUE-TV and NOLA.com crew.

After WVUE became a Fox affiliate in January 1996, the station increased its news programming output from about 15 hours a week to nearly 25 hours, retaining all of its existing newscasts. The station initially retained its noon and 6 p.m. newscasts, but opted air syndicated programming in the 5:30 p.m. half-hour rather than expand its 5 p.m. newscast to a full hour, a move that was atypical of the Big Three stations that switched to Fox during the affiliation switches that occurred between 1994 and 1996. The existing 10 p.m. newscast was moved one hour earlier to 9 p.m. and was expanded to one hour; however, ten months later in October 1996, it was split into separate half-hour newscasts at 9 and 10 p.m., with off-network syndicated sitcoms filling the 9:30 p.m. timeslot. This scheduling for the late evening newscasts continued until 2001, when the weeknight 9 p.m. newscast reverted to an hour-long broadcast, and the 10 p.m. newscast was dropped for a second time due to the lack of a strong program lead-in. Even after the weeknight broadcast expanded to one hour, atypical for most Fox stations that produce their newscasts in-house, the Saturday and Sunday editions of WVUE's 9 p.m. newscast remained a half-hour in length; until those editions were expanded to one hour in 2012, WVUE had been among the largest Fox affiliates by market size to air its prime time newscast in such a fashion.

Even after becoming a Fox affiliate, the station did not carry a newscast on weekday mornings throughout the 1990s; this changed in 2002, when WVUE debuted what was originally a two-hour morning newscast, airing from 6 to 8 a.m. (which by 2005, expanded to three hours with the addition of an 8 a.m. hour of the broadcast). In 2005, WVUE canceled its weeknight 6 p.m. newscast and expanded its 5 p.m. newscast to one hour; this was in concert with the station's acquisition of the popular game shows Jeopardy! and Wheel of Fortune, which the station chose to air together in an hour-long block during the 6 p.m. hour (news-producing stations in the Eastern and Pacific time zones commonly schedule syndicated programs such as Jeopardy! and Wheel in the hour before network prime time, 7 to 8 p.m. in those areas, though this is not very common with such stations in the Central and Mountain time zones).

WVUE's news ratings slowly increased throughout the 2000s (particularly following the station's purchase by the Louisiana Media Company). By the middle of the decade, the station overtook WDSU for the #2 position in the local news ratings, placing behind WWL-TV in the 5 p.m. timeslot. The station remained in second place through 2008 and a see-saw period followed. In May 2011, the station again ranked third in the 5 p.m. time period. The station has consistently ranked third among the market's morning and afternoon newscasts with three or more local options since that time, while posting its best ratings at night. The station bests many network prime time shows during the 9 p.m. hour (WVUE's ratings for its prime time newscast outperformed WNOL-TV and WUPL's newscasts—both produced by their respective duopoly partners, WGNO and WWL-TV—in the same timeslots, with both of those stations eventually cancelling those programs outright), and at 10 p.m., WVUE has generally held second place in the market. In recent years, the station's news department has won several Regional Emmy Awards for its news coverage; it also won duPont–Columbia Awards for its breaking news coverage and investigative reporting in 2013 and 2014 and a Peabody Award in 2013 for its investigation into campaign financing in Louisiana. In the November 2018 sweeps period, WVUE bested WDSU, WWL and WGNO in the local news race for the first time in ratings history. Aside from the Noon newscast, WVUE placed first in the ratings in every time period in which it broadcast a local newscast.

On April 29, 2007, WVUE became the first television station in New Orleans to begin broadcasting its local newscasts in high definition. In January 2010, WVUE underwent a major production upgrade that included the transition of field video to high definition, and the introduction of the first HD-based weather system in the New Orleans market. As of October 2014, WVUE and now WWL-TV are the only New Orleans area stations to broadcast its local newscasts in high definition; this is in contrast to WDSU and WGNO, all of which broadcast their newscasts in 16:9 widescreen standard definition.

On February 1, 2010, WVUE expanded its weekday morning newscast to four hours, with the addition of an hour-long weather-based newscast at 5 a.m. titled Fox 8 Morning Call, the program was replaced in 2012 by a traditional local newscast during that hour. The station restored a 10 p.m. newscast to its schedule after nine years on that same date; initially only airing as a test run, it was added to the schedule full-time on May 5, 2010, after former WWL-TV anchor Lee Zurik joined channel 8 as an anchor and investigative reporter. The 10 p.m. newscast later expanded to weekend evenings in July 2010; as a result, WVUE became one of about a dozen Fox stations nationwide with a newscast in the traditional late news timeslot that airs seven nights a week. On May 23, 2011, channel 8 debuted an hour-long midday newscast that airs Monday through Fridays at noon. This was followed on September 12 of that year, with the debut of an hour-long newscast at 4 p.m.

In the summer of 2012, WVUE entered into a content partnership with The Times-Picayune in which the station and newspaper would collaborate on sports coverage. On June 27, 2013, this partnership was expanded to include news content (including collaborations on investigative reports and entertainment stories), breaking news updates and analysis occasionally provided by Times-Picayune reporters on WVUE's newscasts and the sharing of photo and video content; WVUE also began to provide weather forecasts for the newspaper and its companion website, NOLA.com. On April 21, 2014, WVUE began airing its weekday morning newscast at 4:30 a.m., expanding the program to 4 1/2 hours. On September 10, 2018, WVUE debuted a 9 a.m. newscast.

==== Notable former on-air staff ====
- Bernard "Buddy" Diliberto – sports director/anchor (1966–1981)
- Jennifer Hale
- Jim Henderson
- Fred Hickman – sports director/anchor (2011–2015)
- Arthel Neville – anchor/reporter
- Nash Roberts – station's first chief meteorologist (1974–1978)
- Norman Robinson – anchor/reporter (1976–1978)
- Chris Rose – provided a weekly editorial on-air and online
- Ron Swoboda – sports anchor
- Leslie Sykes – anchor/reporter

== Technical information ==
=== Subchannels ===
The station's signal is multiplexed:

Subchannels of WVUE-DT
Subchannel	Res.	Short name	Programming
7.1	720p	GCSEN	Gulf Coast Sports & Entertainment Network
8.1	720p	FOX8	Fox
8.2	480i	Bounce	Bounce TV
8.4	480i	Mystery	Ion Mystery
8.5	480i	Oxygen	Oxygen
8.6	480i	StartTV	Start TV
54.5	480i	Cozi	Cozi TV (WUPL)

Broadcast on behalf of another station

Digital subchannel 8.2 originally launched in 2007 as the Fox 8 Newschannel, a 24-hour news simulcast and rebroadcast service similar to WWL-TV's NewsWatch 15 cable channel. On August 23, 2010, WVUE announced that it would carry the Retro Television Network on a digital subchannel; that September, 8.2 switched to a mix of RTV programming on weekdays, as well as similar general entertainment programming on weekends. On November 11, 2011, WVUE signed an affiliation agreement with Bounce TV; the network replaced RTV on digital subchannel 8.2 on November 12, 2011. In March 2012, WVUE became one of the first (if not the first) stations in the United States to create a managerial position for a subchannel, with the hiring of Curtis Pace as general manager of digital channel 8.2.

=== Analog-to-digital conversion ===
WVUE shut down its analog signal, over VHF channel 8, on December 15, 2008, becoming the first New Orleans television station to cease analog transmission of its signal and exclusively broadcast a digital signal, and the second, after Telemundo affiliate KGLA-DT (channel 42, which signed on in June 2007 without a companion analog signal), to become a digital-only station prior to the June 12, 2009 digital television transition. One week later on December 22, the station's digital signal relocated from its pre-transition UHF channel 29 to VHF channel 8. Due to reception problems that were reported by viewers following the transition, WVUE petitioned the FCC to move its digital signal back to UHF channel 29. The station opted to do this instead of increasing its transmitter power, which would have caused interference with Baton Rouge CBS affiliate WAFB (whose analog signal operated on VHF channel 9, where its digital signal operates post-transition). WVUE resumed digital operations on UHF channel 29 on November 30, 2010.

After the Louisiana Media Company acquired WVUE from Emmis Communications, a high definition feed of the station's digital signal was finally added to Cox Communications' New Orleans system in August 2008, and to Charter Communications systems in the Northshore and Tri-Parish area in that September (both Charter and Cox carry WVUE-DT on digital channel 708). WVUE's high definition feed has since been added to other cable providers in southeastern Louisiana and southern Mississippi, as well as in the New Orleans market on AT&T U-verse.
