= WLPN-LP (New Orleans) =

Television station in New Orleans (1986–2010)

- New Orleans, Louisiana; United States
- Channels: Analog: 61 (UHF)

Programming
- Affiliations: Channel America (1989–1995)

Ownership
- Owner: Glenn R. and Karin A. Plummer

History
- Founded: November 14, 1986
- Last air date: August 17, 2010 (license deleted)
- Former call signs: W61AZ (1986–1996)

Technical information
- Facility ID: 24302
- Class: LP
- ERP: 40 kW
- Transmitter coordinates: 29°55′11″N 90°1′29″W

WLPN-LP (channel 61) was a low-power television station in New Orleans, Louisiana, United States, owned by Glenn and Karin Plummer. The channel 61 allocation was formerly used by ABC affiliate WJMR-TV (now Fox affiliate WVUE-DT). In 1989, the station affiliated with Channel America. The station's license was canceled on August 17, 2010.
