= NewsWatch 15 =

Cable TV channel in New Orleans, Louisiana

- Country: United States
- Broadcast area: New Orleans metropolitan area
- Headquarters: New Orleans, Louisiana

Programming
- Language: English
- Picture format: 1080i (HDTV); 480i (SDTV)

Ownership
- Owner: Tegna Inc., a subsidiary of Nexstar Media Group; Cox Communications (both own 50%)
- Sister channels: WWL-TV, WUPL

History
- Launched: October 20, 1989

NewsWatch on Channel 15 (popularly known as NewsWatch 15) is an American regional cable television channel serving New Orleans, Louisiana. The channel is owned as a joint venture between the Tegna subsidiary of Nexstar Media Group and local cable provider Cox Communications. NewsWatch 15's operations are based out of the studio facility shared by Nexstar-owned CBS affiliate WWL-TV (channel 4) and MyNetworkTV affiliate WUPL (channel 54), located on Rampart Street in the city's historic French Quarter district. The regional cable news channel's branding is derived from its channel slot in the New Orleans area on Cox Communications channel 15.

== Background ==
NewsWatch on Channel 15 launched on October 20, 1989; it was formed via a partnership that was formed in 1988 between WWL-TV and Cox Cable (now Cox Communications), the latter of which serves as the major cable provider for areas of Greater New Orleans located south of Lake Pontchartrain, to create a cable-only news channel. Among the first regional news channels of its kind in the United States, NewsWatch was created in response to the growing number of area residents whose busy schedules did not permit them to watch a newscast at traditional broadcast times. NewsWatch 15 is available to nearly 290,000 households with cable television service in Orleans, Jefferson, St. Tammany, St. Bernard Parish and St. Charles Parishes.

== Programming ==
NewsWatch 15 primarily airs a mix of simulcasts of WWL-TV's weekday morning, noon, weeknight and weekend evening newscasts (which have been branded as Eyewitness News since 1968), as well as rolling rebroadcasts of those programs during timeslots normally slotted for syndicated or CBS network programming on over-the-air channel 4 (for example, the station's 5:00 p.m. newscast is only rebroadcast at 5:30 p.m. due to the live simulcast of the succeeding 6:00 p.m. newscast; in stark contrast, the Saturday edition of WWL-TV's 10:00 p.m. Eyewitness News Nightwatch broadcast is replayed on NewsWatch 15 until as late as 11:05 p.m. Sunday evening as WWL does not carry a newscast until Sunday evenings, and during the NFL season, may only air the late newscast). The channel also carries coverage of breaking news events that do not necessarily warrant extended coverage on channel 4.
