= Nash Roberts =

Meteorologist (1918–2010)

- 1960s WDSU logo featuring Nash Roberts
- Born: Nash Charles Roberts Jr. April 13, 1918; New Orleans, Louisiana
- Died: December 18, 2010 (aged 92); Metairie, Louisiana
- Occupation: Meteorologist
- Known for: Accuracy of hurricane forecasts

Nash Charles Roberts Jr. (April 13, 1918 – December 18, 2010) was a New Orleans, Louisiana-based meteorologist widely known for the accuracy of his hurricane forecasts.

== Career ==
He began his career in weather as an officer of the United States Navy during World War II. He worked for Admiral Chester Nimitz in the Pacific. Roberts was on the first plane to enter the eye of a tropical system near the Philippines. This method is still used today by the "Hurricane Hunters" of the Air Force based at Keesler Air Force Base in Biloxi, Mississippi, to measure and record internal conditions in hurricanes in the Gulf of Mexico, the Caribbean Sea and Atlantic Ocean to help predict their development and path.

After leaving the navy in 1946, Roberts opened a meteorological consulting business in downtown New Orleans, catering to oil companies, drilling firms and other businesses whose operations depended on weather conditions. He told WWL-TV anchor Angela Hill he had never envisioned working in television and refused offers to do so until a local advertising executive offered to finance his visiting Chicago to observe the weathercaster of that city's NBC affiliate station at work. After seeing this, Roberts reasoned he could do the job and accepted an offer to begin TV work on a consultant basis. Throughout his career at several New Orleans stations, he insisted on never being a direct employee of any station but a contractor, to preserve his independence in forecasting, and worked out of his own company's office rather than on station premises when not on camera.

On October 1, 1951, he began broadcasting on WDSU-TV. Roberts was the first full-time weathercaster in the Deep South and one of the first to use radar on television weather broadcasts.

Roberts continued as a local forecaster on New Orleans television and radio. His calm guidance during these storms made him legendary to people throughout southeast Louisiana. He was the only local forecaster to accurately predict the paths of Hurricane Betsy in 1965, which hit the New Orleans area directly, and Hurricane Camille in 1969, a storm that devastated coastal Mississippi.

After departing WDSU in November 1973, he moved to then-new Newscene 8 WVUE-TV in January 1974 for 4 years, then to Eyewitness News at WWL-TV on March 20, 1978. As he aged, he gradually cut back his schedule, giving most of the day-to-day weathercasting chores to younger meteorologists Al Duckworth, who had been at WWL since becoming its first chief meteorologist in July 1968, and Dave Barnes.

In later years, Roberts was the favorite forecaster in the area, especially among older viewers, to the point where competitors good-naturedly referred to him as "the Weather God". After his retirement, he would be brought back as a special consultant when hurricanes threatened in the Gulf. By the late 1980s he seemed to many like a figure from an earlier era, as he eschewed computer graphics and other modern special effects in favor of a simple black marker and paper map. Nash retired from the Eyewitness News anchor desk in February 1984, but would come back during storms to help calm and educate the locals during hurricane season, sometimes to the visible resentment of the station's younger weathermen, especially when Nash's experience, intuition, and pen and paper yielded more accurate predictions than their computer models. He accurately predicted the path of Hurricane Georges in 1998, while all the full-time on-air meteorologists of the area, namely Bob Breck of WVUE and Dan Milham of WDSU, predicted an incorrect track.

Roberts finally retired from even his special hurricane appearances in July 2001 (in part to help take care of his wife of over 60 years, Lydia), and that same year donated his papers to Loyola University, New Orleans.

He was fully retired, and had not been seen on TV in several years by 2006. Roberts and his wife evacuated in advance of Hurricane Katrina in 2005, the first time he had left town for a hurricane. Roberts figures prominently in a 2006 book about Hurricane Camille, Roar of the Heavens, by Stefan Bechtel.

== Personal life ==
Lydia and Nash Roberts had two sons, four grandchildren and six great grandchildren. Lydia Roberts died in June 2007.

== Death ==
Nash died on December 18, 2010, after a lengthy illness at 92.
