= WDSU =

Television station in New Orleans

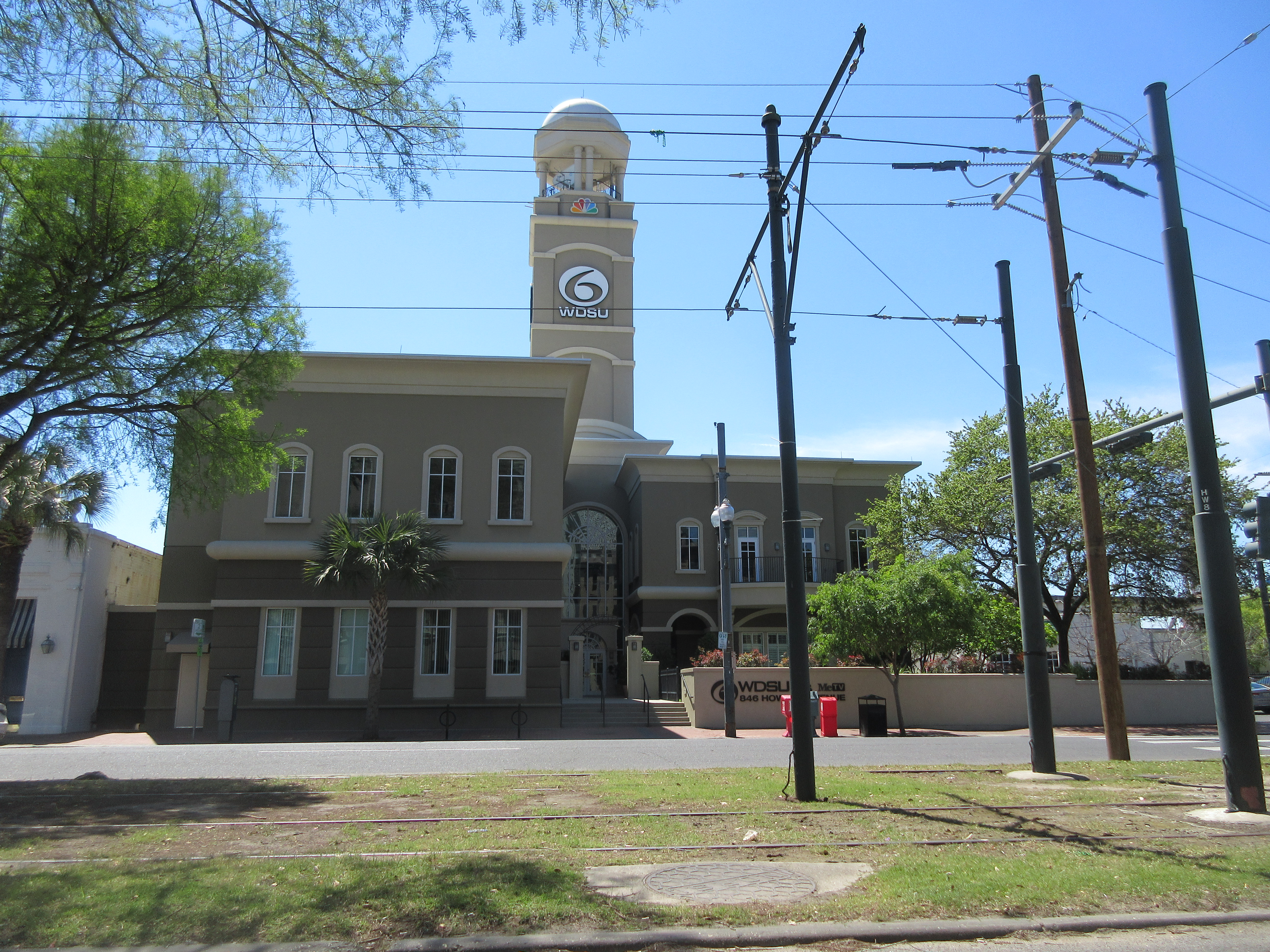
- WDSU building on Howard Avenue.
- New Orleans, Louisiana; United States
- Channels: Digital: 19 (UHF); Virtual: 6
- Branding: WDSU Channel 6

Programming
- Affiliations: 6.1: NBC; for others, see § Subchannels

Ownership
- Owner: Hearst Television; (New Orleans Hearst Television Inc.)

History
- First air date: December 18, 1948
- Former call signs: WDSU-TV (1948–1993)
- Former channel numbers: Analog: 6 (VHF, 1948–2009); Digital: 43 (UHF, until 2020)
- Former affiliations: All secondary: DuMont (1948–1955); CBS (1948–1957); ABC (1948–1957); NTA Film Network (1957–1961)
- Call sign meaning: Taken from WDSU-AM/FM, once housed at the DeSoto Hotel, States newspaper news partner and founded by Joseph Uhalt

Technical information
- Licensing authority: FCC
- Facility ID: 71357
- ERP: 925 kW
- HAAT: 288.4 m (946 ft)
- Transmitter coordinates: 29°57′0″N 89°57′28″W

Links
- Public license information: Public file; LMS
- Website: www.wdsu.com

WDSU (channel 6) is a television station in New Orleans, Louisiana, United States, affiliated with NBC and owned by Hearst Television. The station's studios are located on Howard Avenue in the city's Central Business District, and its transmitter is located on East Josephine Street in Chalmette.

== History ==
The station first signed on the air on December 18, 1948. It was the first television station to sign on in the state of Louisiana, the first in the city of New Orleans, the first on the Gulf Coast, the first in the Deep South, and the 49th in the nation. It was founded by New Orleans businessman Edgar B. Stern Jr., owner of WDSU radio (1280 AM, now WODT; and 93.3 FM, now WQUE-FM). Stern had inherited the construction permit to build the television station a few months earlier when he bought the WDSU radio stations for $750,000. The station has been a primary NBC affiliate since it signed on, owing to WDSU radio's longtime affiliation with the NBC Radio Network; however, it initially also carried programming from the three other major broadcast networks at the time: CBS, ABC, and the DuMont Television Network. It lost DuMont programming when that network ceased operations in August 1956. Even after WJMR-TV (channel 61, now Fox affiliate WVUE on channel 8) signed on in November 1953 as a primary CBS and secondary ABC affiliate, WDSU continued to "cherry-pick" a few of the higher-rated programs carried by those two networks until September 1957, when WWL-TV (channel 4) signed on as a full-time CBS affiliate. At that time, WJMR became a full-time ABC affiliate, leaving WDSU exclusively with NBC.

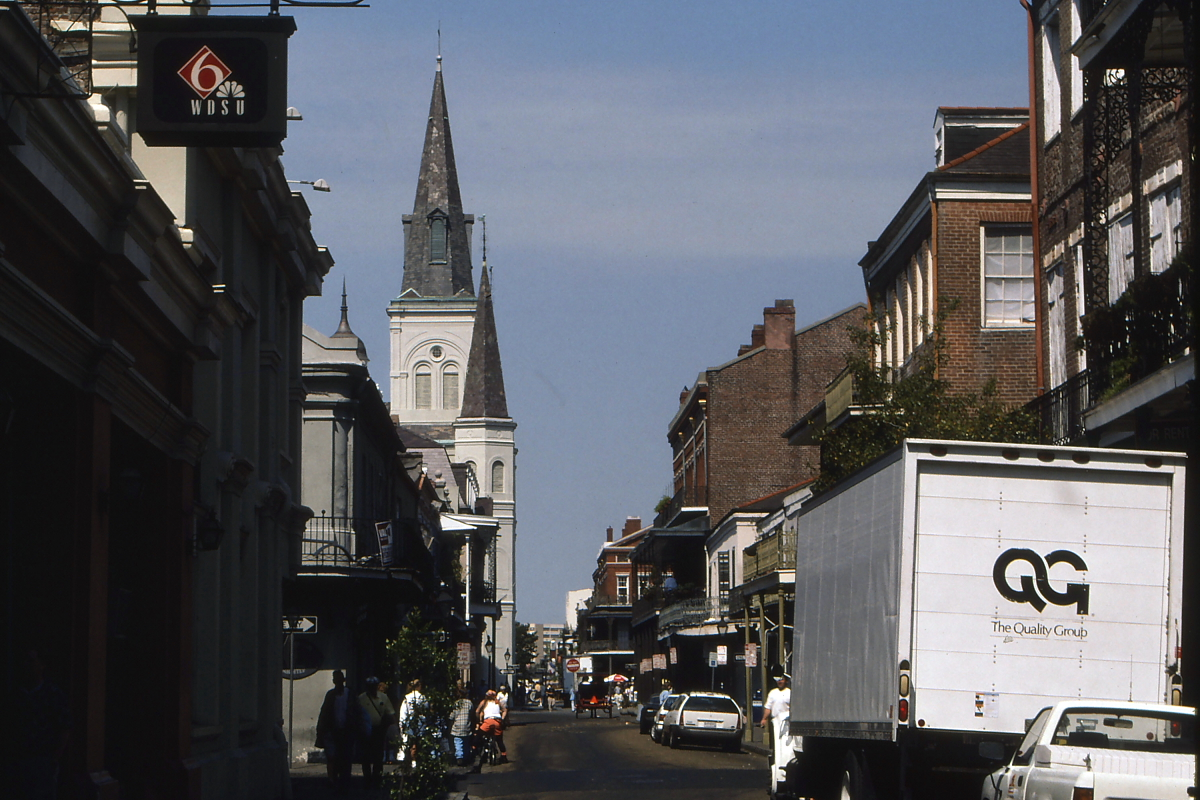
WDSU's longtime French Quarter location, seen shortly before their move in 1996.

The radio station was originally located at the DeSoto Hotel (now the Le Pavillon Hotel) on Baronne Street; the "D" in the name stood for the DeSoto, while "S" referred to the now-defunct New Orleans States newspaper (which had maintained a news share agreement with WDSU radio that lasted for one year; in 1958, the paper merged with the New Orleans Item-Tribune, which in turn merged with the Times-Picayune in 1980) and the "U" stood for Joseph Uhalt, who founded the radio station as WCBE in 1923. WDSU-TV originally operated out of studio facilities located within the Hibernia Bank Building, the tallest building in New Orleans at the time (a plaque commemorating its distinction as the station's original broadcasting facility is located on the 14th floor of the building). The WDSU stations moved into the historic Brulatour Mansion on Royal Street in the French Quarter in April 1950; Stern had also bought other buildings near the mansion (including a lumber yard and an ice house) to construct production studios for the radio and television stations. At that point, Stern reorganized his business interests as the Royal Street Corporation. The transmitter site remained at the Hibernia Bank Building until 1955, when it moved to its tall tower in Chalmette.

In the 1950s, WDSU-TV became the springboard for the career of Dick Van Dyke, first as a single comedian and later as the emcee of a locally produced comedy program on the station; among his duties, Van Dyke had also served as a staff announcer, hosted music programs and appeared in a segment during the station's noon newscast. WDSU-TV became the first television station in the New Orleans market to telecast its programming in color in 1955. WDSU-TV was the ratings leader in New Orleans for over a quarter century, largely because of its strong commitment to coverage of local events and news. It originated the first live broadcasts of the Sugar Bowl and Mardi Gras, and was the first area station to provide extensive local hurricane coverage. The station was also the first television station in the market to provide statewide election coverage, as well as the first to use a mobile newsgathering unit.

WDSU-TV was also the first to originate an international broadcast, relaying a Today broadcast from Bimini to the United States in 1955, using a 300,000 watt transmitter built by WDSU-TV engineers via special permission granted to NBC by the Federal Communications Commission (FCC).

In January 1972, Royal Street merged with Columbia, South Carolina–based Cosmos Broadcasting in a $17 million deal. Cosmos decided to sell off the radio stations because the ownership of the three station properties combined would exceed ownership limits of the time set by the FCC. Cosmos eliminated much of the local flavor that had been the station's hallmark, opting to concentrate on its already strong news operation (channel 6 had been saluted by Time as a news pioneer in 1966). By the early 1980s, rival WWL-TV had overtaken WDSU as the top-rated station from sign-on to sign-off as well as in local news. WDSU has been a solid runner-up to WWL for most of the last quarter-century, although since the mid-2000s, it has had to fend off a strong challenge from a resurgent WVUE. In 1984, WDSU built the first working television studio at a World's Fair for the station's live broadcasts from the event held in New Orleans that year. On February 17, 1986, WDSU became the first NBC affiliate in Louisiana to broadcast its programs in stereo.

Cosmos sold WDSU to Pulitzer, Inc. for $47 million in 1989. Under Pulitzer, channel 6 finally dropped the "-TV" suffix from its calls in 1993, more than 20 years after it and its former radio sisters had gone their separate ways. In March 1996, the station moved into its current facility on Howard Avenue, located a few blocks from the Le Pavillon Hotel, where WDSU radio began operations in 1923. Also during the 1990s, WDSU became the first New Orleans station to operate its own Doppler weather radar system ("Super Doppler 6000"). Pulitzer sold its entire television station division, including WDSU, to Hearst-Argyle Television (predecessor to the present-day Hearst Television) in 1999 for $1.8 billion. WDSU celebrated its 60th anniversary of broadcasting on December 18, 2008.

Since 2009, WDSU has simply branded with its callsign in most verbal references, despite retaining the "channel 6" red dot logo it has used since 2000. In 2015, the NBC Peacock logo was added to the "channel 6" red dot logo.

=== Hurricane Katrina ===
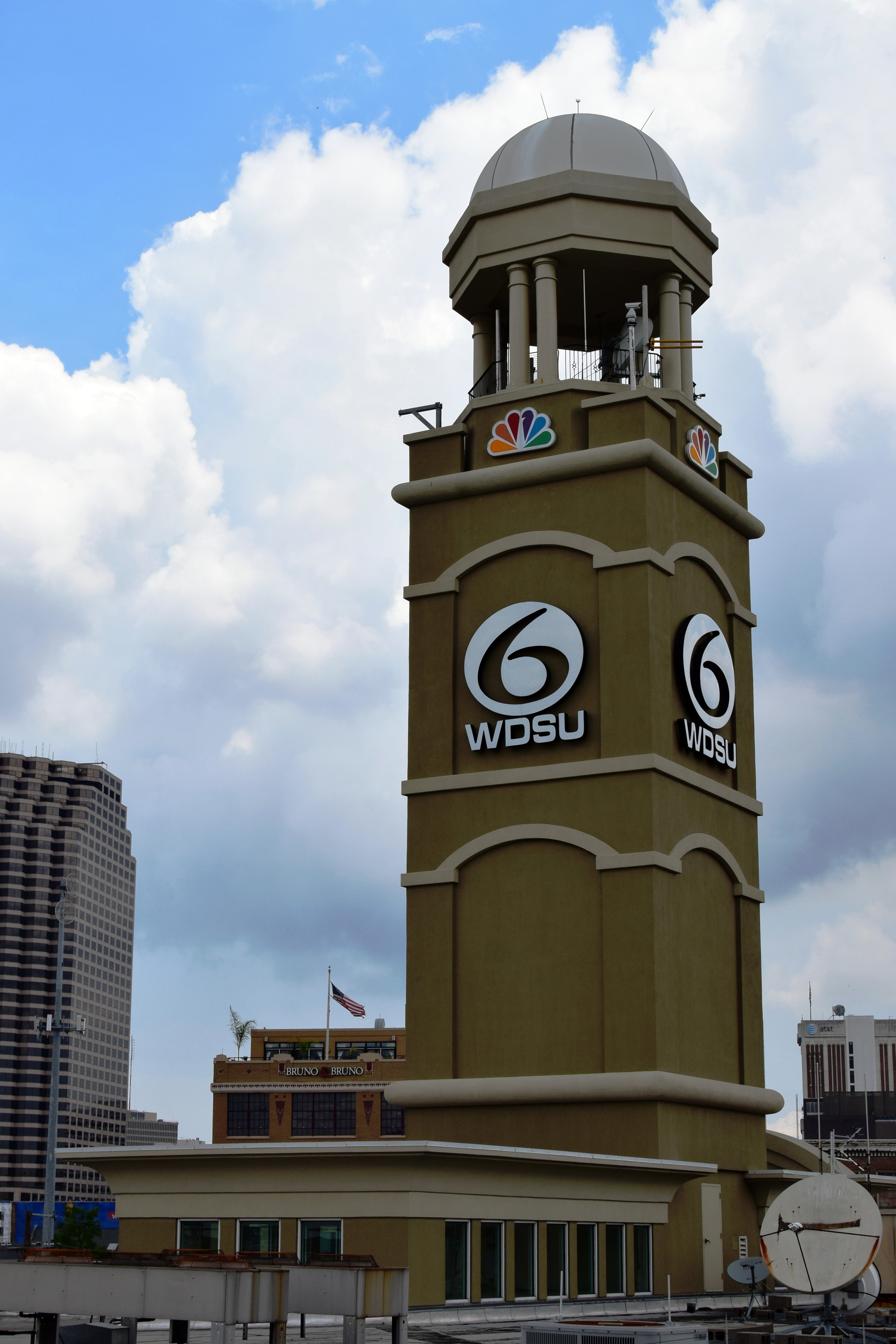
WDSU's iconic studio tower (2014)

Prior to the landfall of Hurricane Katrina, WDSU shut down operations at its studios in New Orleans around 9:30 p.m. on August 28, 2005, to allow station staff to take shelter from the oncoming hurricane. At that point, WDSU's broadcasts began to originate from the studios of ABC-affiliated sister station WAPT in Jackson, Mississippi, where some of WDSU's on-air staff had already evacuated. Fellow sister station, NBC affiliate WESH in Orlando, Florida, also originated some on-air weather content during the storm. In the weeks that immediately followed the hurricane, WDSU's news programming originated from the WAPT facility, using meteorologists and anchors from both stations, with programs being simulcast in Jackson and New Orleans.

The Howard Avenue studio facility largely withstood Hurricane Katrina with minimal damage, but WDSU's analog and digital transmitters were both destroyed in the storm. In early September, WDSU arranged to transmit its signal via i: Independent Television affiliate (now Ion Television owned-and-operated station) WPXL-TV (channel 49) through the end of December 2005; WDSU also partnered with i O&O KPXB-TV in Houston to simulcast WDSU's morning newscast and continuing coverage of the storm's aftermath that channel 6 had aired between 6 and 11 p.m. from September 7 to 13, 2005. The station restored its analog signal, operating at reduced power, in October 2005. WDSU chose to replace its existing transmitter building with an elevated and rugged hurricane resistant building to house its analog and digital transmitters; construction of this building was completed in early February 2008. WDSU's digital signal was restored on August 1, 2007, having temporarily shared a frequency with LeSEA Broadcasting-owned WHNO's digital signal on UHF channel 21. In late February 2008, WDSU's analog signal was upgraded to full power; its digital signal on channel 6.1 was restored on March 6, 2008.

=== Hurricane Gustav ===
In September 2008, WDSU broadcast continuous coverage of the approach, landfall and aftermath of Hurricane Gustav for five consecutive days. The storm prompted a massive evacuation of much of the station's viewing area. As a result, on September 1, 2008, satellite provider DirecTV began simulcasting WDSU's coverage of Hurricane Gustav nationally on channel 361. Its storm coverage was also streamed on the station's website, while its broadcast audio was carried by the stations within Citadel Broadcasting's New Orleans radio cluster. C-SPAN2 and ABC affiliate WBRZ (channel 2) in Baton Rouge also ran portions of the station's live news coverage of Gustav.

WDSU tapped the resources of parent company Hearst-Argyle Television, and brought in personnel from Hearst-owned television stations across the country to assist in various capacities. Some members of WDSU's news staff were relocated to support studios in Baton Rouge and Orlando, and provided reports via satellite. All three locations stayed operational throughout the storm's duration. Another of WDSU's sister stations, ABC affiliate KOCO-TV in Oklahoma City, also provided WDSU's coverage of Hurricane Gustav via its second digital subchannel for evacuees who came to Oklahoma City.

== Programming ==
Today, WDSU clears the entire NBC programming lineup, only preempting certain programs during instances in which the station has to carry extended breaking news or severe weather coverage.

The station's notable local programs over the years included Midday, one of the earliest magazine programs in the United States, hosted by Terry Flettrich (later Rohe, who eventually served as senior citizens affairs correspondent for Good Morning America); the 3:00 Money Movie, a Saturday afternoon movie showcase with irreverent wraparound segments hosted by Sam Adams, who regularly performed parody songs on a piano serving as clues to the answers during phone-in contests for cash prizes; and Morgus the Magnificent, a program hosted by a mad doctor character played by Sid Noel.

In the early 1980s, the station sustained criticism among its viewers when it chose to preempt Late Night with David Letterman in favor of airing the syndicated late night talk show Thicke of the Night, which was a notorious flop; around this time, the station also carried feature films during the overnight hours instead of airing the short-lived news program NBC News Overnight. Cox Cable provided a feed of Late Night from WRBT (now WVLA-TV) in Baton Rouge as an interim solution for their subscribers. When WDSU began clearing Late Night, the station aired the show an hour later than the recommended 11:35 p.m. timeslot for the network's Central Time Zone stations, instead airing syndicated reruns of The Love Boat.

WDSU serves as the local over-the-air broadcaster of Monday Night Football games involving the New Orleans Saints, airing simulcasts of ESPN-televised games that are not aired on WGNO through ABC's national simulcast. WDSU's corporate parent, Hearst Communications, holds a 20% ownership stake in ESPN (the network's remaining ownership interest is held by The Walt Disney Company), and the company has right of first refusal for simulcasts of ESPN's NFL telecasts in a team's home market, which it has never declined for WDSU (in these situations, the station reschedules NBC's Monday lineup). The station also provides additional game analysis from former Saints coach Jim E. Mora. Prior to 2006, when NBC gained the rights to Sunday night games, WDSU also aired Saints games from 1973 to 1997 whenever the team played host to an AFC team at Tulane Stadium/the Superdome (if the game was sold out 72 hours prior to kickoff; otherwise, the broadcast was blacked out in New Orleans and Baton Rouge under NFL rules), via NBC's contract to broadcast AFC games in those years. The station also provided local coverage of Super Bowl IX, which was hosted at Tulane Stadium, and Super Bowls XV and XX, both of which were hosted at the Superdome. Since 2025, WDSU has aired select New Orleans Pelicans games as part of NBC's contact with the NBA.

The station was unusual in airing Maury from its September 1991 premiere, carrying the show for 27 years until September 2018, despite the program taking a tabloid/conflict focus in the late 1990s and becoming universally associated with affiliates of smaller networks such as The WB, UPN and The CW. WDSU ended carriage of the show upon the launch of a noon newscast, effectively leaving the program off the station schedule, though it quickly found a new home in the market on WNOL-TV.

=== News operation ===
WDSU presently broadcasts 38 hours of locally produced newscasts each week (with six hours each weekday, 3 1/2 hours on Saturdays and 4 1/2 hours on Sundays). The station also maintains a content partnership with Cumulus Media's New Orleans FM radio cluster (KKND [106.7], KMEZ [102.9], WZRH [92.3] and WRKN [106.1]), which also allows the station to simulcast its broadcast audio during hurricane coverage.

From the start of its news operation, WDSU's newscasts were the highest-rated in the New Orleans market for many years. For much of the time since the early 1980s, WDSU's newscasts have been in second place among the market's news-producing stations. By the mid-2000s, WVUE overtook WDSU for second place among the market's 5 p.m. newscasts; the two stations traded second at 5 p.m. until WDSU overtook WVUE in May 2011. In July 2011, WDSU claimed ratings wins in key demographics at 5 and 6 p.m.—marking the first time in a quarter-century that a station other than WWL-TV had placed first among viewers most sought by advertisers. Newscasts in less competitive time periods of 4:30 a.m. and 4 p.m. also scored wins in key demographic categories, as well as in household ratings.

Among WDSU's first staffers was meteorologist Nash Roberts, one of the first television weather forecasters in the United States, who drew predicted weather conditions by marker on wall maps (Roberts left the station in 1973 to become meteorologist at WVUE-TV); and Mel Leavitt, who served as the station's original sports director and later as its special events director. The station's news department began in 1955, under the guidance of original news director Bill Monroe (who later joined NBC News, first serving as Washington-based news editor for Today and later as moderator of Meet the Press); Monroe also provided editorials on the station, becoming one of the first stations in the country to provide such segments for television. During the 1950s and 1960s, the station carried editorial cartoons (similar to those commonly found in many newspapers) drawn by cartoonist John Churchill Chase; the twice-daily segments featured his take on major local, national and international news stories with commentary over the illustrated pieces (Chase, who died in 1986, has a street in the Warehouse District named in his honor). Many of the station's reporters in the early years of its news department included staffers from the Times-Picayune newspaper (including Iris Kelso, who worked at WDSU from 1967 to 1978, before returning to the Times-Picayune).

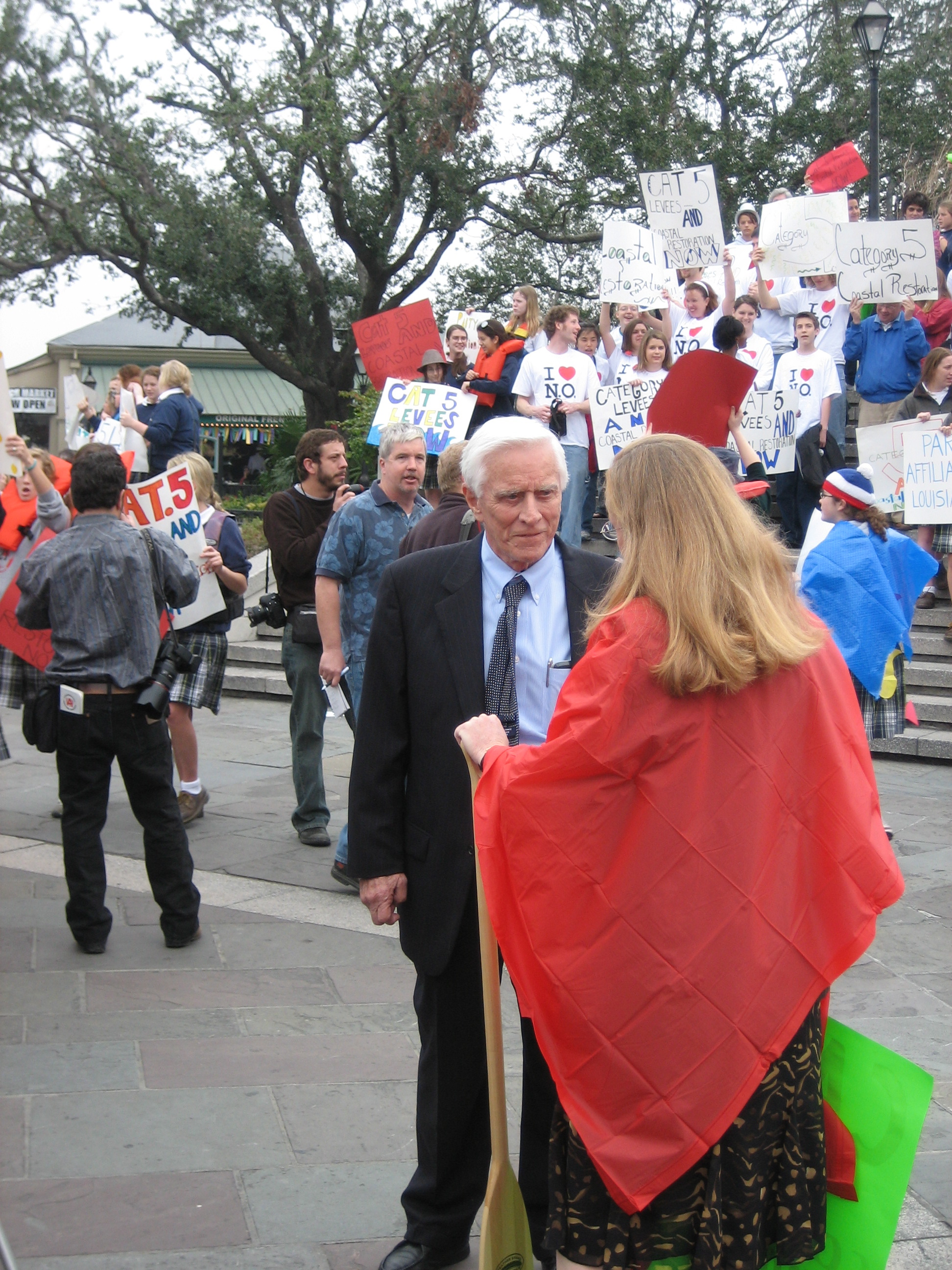
Alec Gifford at a rally calling better protection of the city following the Federal levee failure disaster of 2005.

On November 11, 2006, after 51 years in New Orleans broadcast television—nearly all of them with WDSU—anchor and former news director Alec Gifford (who died in March 2013) officially announced his retirement from broadcasting. Gifford left the station in December 2006. On December 14, 2008, WDSU entered into a content partnership with Biloxi newspaper Sun Herald, to provide supplementary news and weather coverage focused on South Mississippi. WDSU discontinued its noon newscast on September 11, 2009; three days later on September 14, the station launched an hour-long 4 p.m. newscast; this program gained a competitor on September 12, 2011, when Fox affiliate WVUE debuted its own hour-long newscast in the 4 p.m. timeslot.

On July 10, 2010, WDSU began broadcasting its local newscasts in 16:9 widescreen standard definition, along with the introduction of updated graphics. WDSU is one of now two stations in the New Orleans market that have yet to upgrade production of their local news programming to high definition. WGNO began broadcasting high-definition local news in mid-2011 when it installed a new HDTV control room and studio cameras. WVUE was the first only station in the market that broadcasts its local newscasts in true high definition, having upgraded to HD in April 2007. WWL-TV made the switch to full HD on October 1, 2014. On August 16, 2010, WDSU expanded its weekday morning newscast to 2 1/2 hours, by adding a 4:30 a.m. newscast entitled WDSU News First Edition. On September 3, 2018, WDSU relaunched an hour-long midday newscast, ending a nine-year absence.

As of August 1, 2019, WDSU is now one of three remaining Hearst Television stations to have yet to upgrade production of their local newscasts to HD (Albuquerque ABC affiliate KOAT and Louisville CBS affiliate WLKY are the others).

==== Notable current on-air staff ====
- Margaret Orr (member, AMS; member, NWA) – chief meteorologist

==== Notable former on-air staff ====
- Bernard "Buddy" Diliberto – sportscaster (March 1981–June 1990)
- Iris Kelso – commentator and features reporter (1967–1978)
- Mel Leavitt – newscaster/commentator/moderator/historian
- Carley McCord – sports reporter
- Bill Monroe – first news director
- Helena Moreno – anchor and consumer reporter (November 2000–March 2008)
- Ed Nelson – actor
- Kim Peterson – anchor/reporter
- Dallas Raines – chief meteorologist
- Nash Roberts – meteorologist (October 1951–November 1973)
- Norman Robinson – anchor/reporter (1990–2014)
- Susan Roesgen – anchor/reporter (1993–2001)
- Dick Van Dyke – actor
- Charlie Van Dyke – voice-over and staff announcer
- Charles Zewe – anchor/reporter (August 1976–June 1978/January 1981–May 1987)

== Technical information ==
=== Subchannels ===
The station's signal is multiplexed:

Subchannels of WDSU
Subchannel	Res.	Short name	Programming
6.1	1080i	WDSU-DT	NBC
6.2	480i	MeTV	MeTV
6.3	480i	THE365	365BLK
6.4	480i	STORY	Story Television
6.6	480i	QVC/HSN	QVC
54.4	480i	TruCrim	True Crime Network (WUPL)

Broadcast on behalf of another station

Since March 31, 2012, WDSU digital subchannel 6.2 has been affiliated with MeTV; the subchannel originally launched in 2006 as an affiliate of NBC Weather Plus, before affiliating with The Local AccuWeather Channel in 2009, shortly after Weather Plus' shutdown. Channel 6.2 can be seen on Cox Communications digital cable channel 108 in the New Orleans area, on channel 115 for Charter Spectrum customers on the Northshore, and on channel 136 for Spectrum customers on the Southshore.

=== Analog-to-digital conversion ===
WDSU ended regular programming on its analog signal, over VHF channel 6, on June 12, 2009, the official date on which full-power television stations in the United States transitioned from analog to digital broadcasts under federal mandate. The station's digital signal continued to broadcast on its pre-transition UHF channel 43, using virtual channel 6. Like all stations broadcasting on channel 6 prior to the digital switchover, WDSU's audio signal could be heard on 87.75 MHz on the FM band in New Orleans and the surrounding areas.

As part of the SAFER Act, WDSU kept its analog signal on the air until July 12 to inform viewers of the digital television transition through a loop of public service announcements from the National Association of Broadcasters.

=== Digital retransmission disputes ===
In October 2006, a dispute between WDSU's owner, Hearst-Argyle Television, and Cox Communications caused WDSU's high definition feed to be pulled from Cox's New Orleans area system. As a result, no HD program content from NBC was available in the New Orleans area via any medium (over the air, cable, or satellite), forcing viewers to attempt to receive a signal from Baton Rouge affiliate WVLA-TV. In April 2007, WDSU-DT was added to DirecTV's lineup, after which local cable providers gradually began to add the feed as well. On September 27, 2007, Cox Communications and Hearst-Argyle announced an agreement to restore WDSU-DT to Cox's New Orleans area cable systems; WDSU-DT and WDSU's WeatherPlus channel were added to Cox's channel lineup the next day.
