= Girod Street Cemetery =

Defunct cemetery in New Orleans, Louisiana, US

Coordinates: 29°56′59″N 90°04′44″W

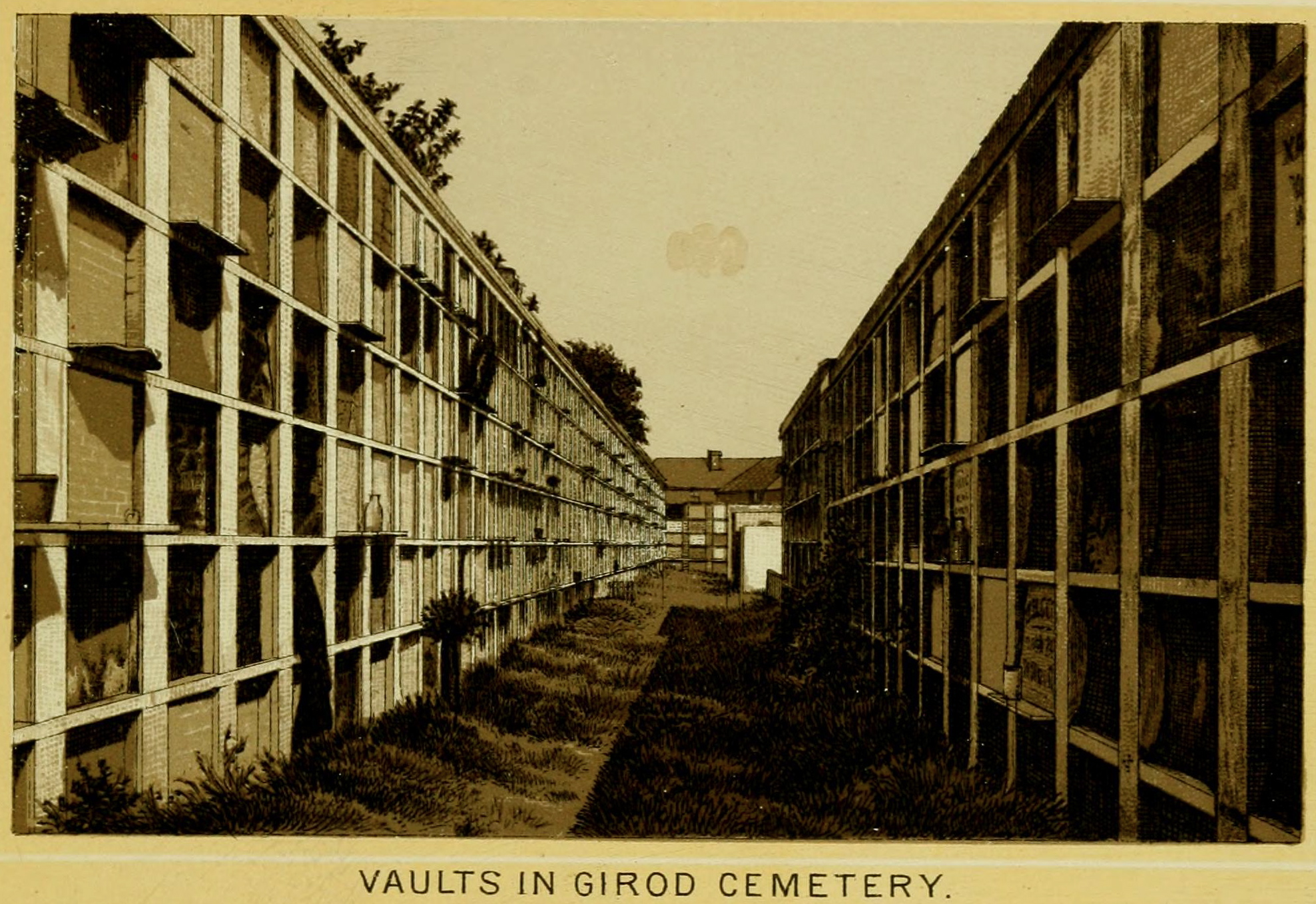
- Row of crypts in Girod Cemetery, 1885
- Interactive map of Girod Street Cemetery

Details
- Established: 1822
- Closed: 1940s
- Location: central New Orleans

The Girod Street Cemetery (also known as the Protestant Cemetery), was a large above-ground cemetery that resided in central New Orleans, Louisiana, established in 1822 for Protestant residents of the Faubourg St. Mary and was closed down in the 1940s. The cemetery then remained unused, until it was officially torn down on January 4, 1957.

== History ==
It consisted of 2,319 wall vaults and approximately 1,100 tombs. As the cemetery was above ground with mostly wall vaults, and was located in what was considered a very "convenient" central area of the city, it had become used as a public burying ground to stack bodies, especially during epidemics. Notables interred there included Congressman Henry Adams Bullard, Zulu Social Club King Joseph J. Smith, Lieutenant Colonel William Wallace Smith Bliss, and California governor John B. Weller.

There were multiple cases (usually during a major epidemic in the nineteenth century) of people getting in fights because people were over stacking the tombs and wall vaults, and they even had to stack bodies near the entrance because there were not enough people to bury the bodies. As it was described during the 1833 cholera epidemic "...the shrouded dead dumped at the gateway of the Girod Street Cemetery accumulated in such numbers that the entrance to its precincts was so obstructed that arriving bodies had to be deposited on the outside; no graves at this time could be dug; no coffins procurable, for there were neither grave diggers to be had nor undertakers to be found." Because most of the bodies in the vaults were from epidemics, the site came to be known as the "yellow fever mound".

Girod Street Cemetery was laid out along a central artery with side aisles, and was noted for its so-called "society tombs", which could rise seven or eight tiers above ground. Societies of (former) slaves owned their own tombs: the First African Baptist Association, the Home Missionary Benevolent Society, and the Male and Female Lutheran Benevolent Society. The New Lusitanos Benevolent Association owned the largest society tomb in Girod Street Cemetery, which was designed by J.N.B. de Pouilly in 1859.

In 1880, a commissioner of Louisiana inspected all the cemeteries of New Orleans. All of them were found to be in good condition except for the Girod Street Cemetery. Since the cemetery vaults had been built hastily with only a single layer of bricks, unpleasant odors of decay were constantly wafting out, but since there was no specific regulation against that, it was considered unimportant. However, the commissioner noted that "in the event of rain [Girod Street Cemetery] is always flooded to such an extent that it will affect the sanitary precautions necessary to prevent the contracting or spreading of any diseases". The commissioner deemed that the Girod Street Cemetery was unsanitary and recommended that it be shut down, but it appears that his recommendation was simply ignored.

By the early 1940s, the Girod Street Cemetery had run into further problems. It was run by the Christ Church Cathedral, and since the mid 1930s people had begun to use newer, better kept cemeteries in the local area. Since the cemetery catered specifically to deceased Protestants, who were in a minority locally, it fell into disuse and disrepair.

During this time the cemetery was subject to vandalism; tombs were found broken into and completely destroyed, a large fire was found burning atop one tomb, and a citizen reported that it looked more like a poultry farm, with many chickens randomly wandering the premises. In 1945 the Christ Church Cathedral tried again to help fix up the cemetery by placing notices on all of the tombs for the owners, saying that if they did not repair their property (the decrepit tombs) within 60 days, it would be demolished by the Church. With the cemetery by now a civic eyesore, in June 1948 under the orders of Mayor Chep Morrison, the cemetery was dismantled. He had people start hauling away bricks, disregarding the protests of the Christ Church Cathedral, and alerted citizens that they should retrieve the remains of loved ones. In October 1958 the remaining 96,000 square feet of the cemetery land were sold to the government for almost $300,000.

The cemetery land was deconsecrated on January 4, 1957. According to local historian Leonard Huber, between January and March 1957 the human remains were moved elsewhere on a racially segregated basis: the whites to Hope Mausoleum of New Orleans and the African Americans to Providence Memorial Park.

Caesars Superdome, Smoothie King Center, Benson Tower, Entergy Tower, and Energy Centre were eventually constructed near to, but not on, the cemetery site. A local superstition alleges that the notoriously poor record of the New Orleans Saints football team for many years was somehow supernaturally tied to the ground on which the dome was constructed. Since 2010, the Saints have gone to the playoffs 7 times and lost 7 times. However, several reliable historical sources indicate that the Superdome was not in fact built on the site of the former cemetery location, but on the former location of the Illinois Central Railroad roundhouse and shops.

The former Girod Street Cemetery site is the current location of the parking garage for the New Orleans Centre shopping mall. However, overlaying a Sanborn map over a current aerial image shows that the cemetery's location was directly underneath the New Orleans Centre and the Superdome's parking garage.

Champions Square, an entertainment district of sports bars and other attractions, was built on the site.

== See also ==
- Nicholas Girod, for whom the street was named
- Historic Cemeteries of New Orleans
