= Thomas Cage =

Louisiana reconstruction era American politician

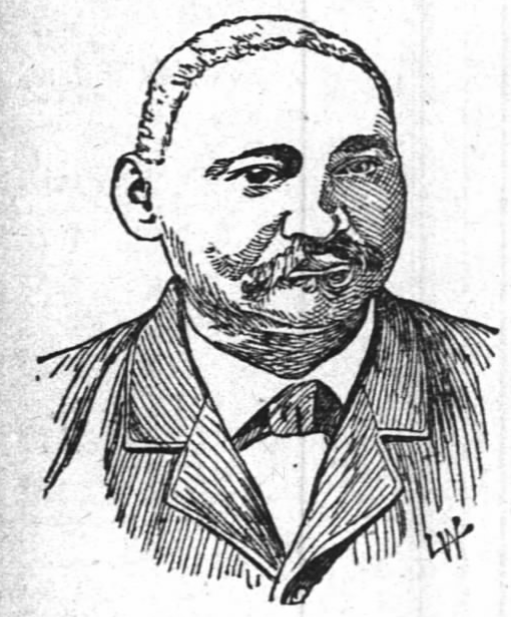

Louisiana State Senate
- In office 1872–1880

Louisiana House of Representatives
- In office 1884–1888

Louisiana State Senate
- In office 1888–1892

Personal details
- Born: c. 1845 Terrebonne Parish, Louisiana
- Died: December 10, 1896 (aged 50–51)
- Party: Republican

Thomas A. Cage (c. 1845 – December 10, 1896) was a state legislator who served in the Louisiana State Senate during the Reconstruction era and the Louisiana House of Representatives and again the Louisiana State Senate post reconstruction.

== Biography ==
Cage was born as a slave in Terrebonne Parish, Louisiana in 1845 and was freed during the American Civil War by the Union Army. His father was Euro-American and his mother was a plantation slave of African descent. He took the name Cage from the sugar plantation's owner Jim Cage.

After the war he moved north from Louisiana and gained an education before returning to Louisiana in 1869. During the reconstruction era he was the editor of the Terrebonne Republican and had acquired a plantation, which he was still successfully running in 1883.

Cage was also a member of the board of trustees of the Southern University at New Orleans appointed in February 1883.

== Political career ==
In 1870 he was elected as a justice of the peace for Houma, Louisiana and in 1871 he was appointed to the position of parish assessor and tax collector by governor Henry C. Warmoth.

He represented Terrebonne as a delegate at the Republican State Convention held in New Orleans in August 1871 where he served on the Committee on Address whose job was to "draft resolutions and an address to the people of Louisiana".

Cage was first elected to the legislature in 1872 to serve in the Louisiana State Senate for the 8th district. He was re-elected in 1876, but Isaiah D. Moore later challenged the result but lost the challenge in a ruling in March 1878. He served from 1872 until 1880 when he was ousted due to the constitution reform of 1879.

He then ran for sheriff for Terrebonne Parish in 1880 and won the position with over 60% of the votes and served four years in the role.

Next Cage was elected to serve in the Louisiana House of Representatives, representing Terrebonne along with G. W. Lyons, and served from 1884 until 1888.

In 1888 Cage again ran for the senate now after the new constitution for a seat serving three parishes, he was duly elected and served one term from 1888 until 1892. During this term he relocated to New Orleans after labor issues caused troubles in Terrebonne Parish.

Cage served as the Republican state central committee chairman during the 1880s and 1890s and remained active in politics until his death at the end of the nineteenth century.

== Death ==
He died at his home on Cypress Street in New Orleans December 10, 1896 after suffering an illness that his doctors gave up on and his death was not unexpected. Although he handled much money during his career he died a relatively poor man, but he did own a store on the corner of Cypress and Derbingy streets where he lived with his family. He was not a religious man with a negative view of many preachers and he was buried in Girod cemetery.

== See also ==
- African American officeholders from the end of the Civil War until before 1900
