= WNOL-TV =

Television station in New Orleans

- New Orleans, Louisiana; United States
- Channels: Digital: 15 (UHF); Virtual: 38
- Branding: NOLA CW38

Programming
- Affiliations: 38.1: The CW; for others, see § Technical information and subchannels

Ownership
- Owner: Nexstar Media Group; (Tribune Television New Orleans, Inc.)
- Sister stations: WGNO; Tegna: WUPL, WWL-TV

History
- First air date: March 25, 1984
- Former channel numbers: Analog: 38 (UHF, 1984–2009)
- Former affiliations: Independent (1984–1986); Fox (1986–1995); The WB (1996–2006)
- Call sign meaning: New Orleans, Louisiana

Technical information
- Licensing authority: FCC
- Facility ID: 54280
- ERP: 775 kW
- HAAT: 286 m (938 ft)
- Transmitter coordinates: 29°57′0″N 89°57′28″W

Links
- Public license information: Public file; LMS
- Website: wgno.com/tag/nola38/

WNOL-TV (channel 38) is a television station in New Orleans, Louisiana, United States, serving as the local outlet for The CW. It is owned by Nexstar Media Group alongside ABC affiliate WGNO (channel 26); Nexstar's Tegna subsidiary owns WWL-TV (channel 4), a CBS affiliate, and WUPL (channel 54), an independent station with MyNetworkTV. WNOL-TV and WGNO share studios at The Galleria in Metairie; WNOL-TV's transmitter is located in Chalmette, Louisiana.

Channel 38 was the second independent station in the New Orleans market when it began broadcasting in 1984. It was owned by Channel 38 Associates, a consortium of mostly out-of-town investors. After a credible start, ratings dropped because of Tribune Broadcasting's purchase of and investment in WGNO, then its primary competition; TVX Broadcast Group acquired the cash-strapped station in late 1985. WNOL became the New Orleans affiliate of Fox at the network's launch in 1986. While the station slowly closed the ratings gap with WGNO, TVX's financial problems led it to sell the station to a group controlled by musician Quincy Jones in 1989.

In 1994, a group in which Fox held a minority stake bought WVUE (channel 8), which had been the ABC affiliate. However, the ABC affiliation went to WGNO. At the same time, Tribune provided financial backing for Jones and other investors to form Qwest Broadcasting and owned a minority stake in the company. On January 1, 1996, WNOL-TV became the new The WB affiliate in the city and absorbed some syndicated programs from WGNO. Upon the legalization of duopolies in 1999, Tribune bought WNOL-TV outright.

Even though Tribune owned two stations in New Orleans, they continued to operate from separate studio facilities until July 2005, when WGNO joined WNOL-TV in the New Orleans Centre shopping mall. A month later, however, Hurricane Katrina inundated the mall and left the two stations without permanent facilities for two years. During this time, in 2006, WNOL-TV began airing a WGNO-produced 9 p.m. newscast, which lasted four years, and The WB yielded to The CW. Tribune was purchased by Nexstar Media Group in 2019.

== History ==
Channel 38 was added to the New Orleans area in 1967 at the request of the Rault Petroleum Company. Rault obtained a construction permit for the station in 1969. The Federal Communications Commission (FCC) canceled the permit, which had carried the call sign WGNO-TV, in 1971 for failure to build.

=== Establishment ===
In 1981, the FCC designated applications from five groups seeking channel 38 for comparative hearing: Oak Television of New Orleans, Delta Media, Cypress Broadcasting, National Group Telecommunications, and Comark Television. Cypress Broadcasting obtained the construction permit; in order to raise additional capital, the firm added 100 partners in November 1983. These included Thomas L. Siebert, brother of original general partner Craig Siebert, and Harold "Hal" E. Protter, who had been the general manager at KPLR-TV in St. Louis. The permit was transferred from Cypress to Channel 38 Associates as a result.

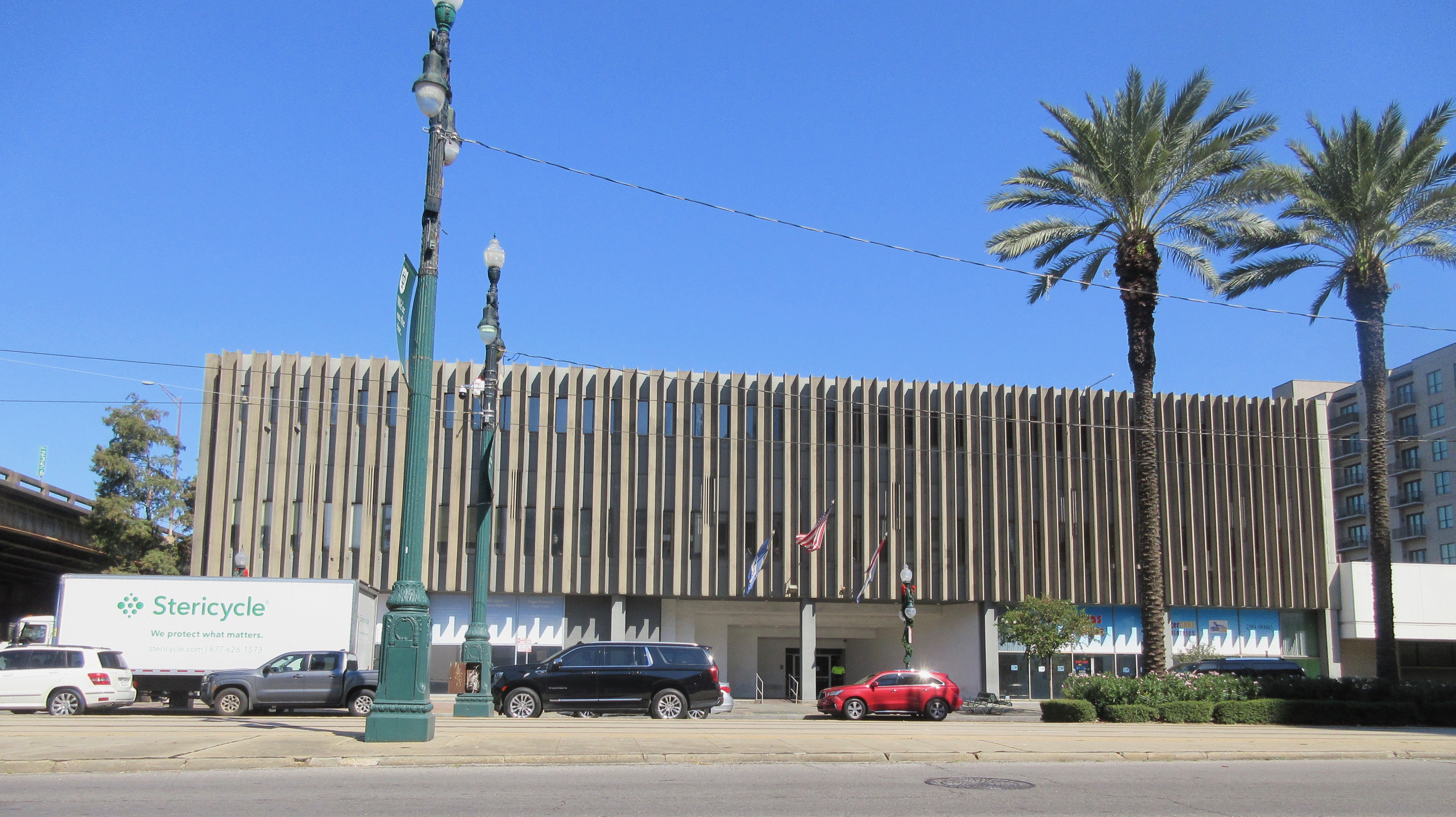
WNOL's original studios were located at 1661 Canal Street in New Orleans.

In spite of the loss of its original broadcast tower in December 1983, WNOL-TV began broadcasting on March 25, 1984, from studios located at 1661 Canal Street. It was the second independent station to sign on in the New Orleans market after WGNO (channel 26), which started in October 1967. Channel 38 aired a lineup including movies, classic reruns, children's shows, and sports. WNOL quickly established strong ratings for a startup station. However, the strong start came with two caveats. One was turnover in personnel; under Protter and his wife Gail Brekke, the station experienced high attrition of staff, one of whom told local media that the executives were "piranhas". Another was a change in ownership at WGNO in 1983, when Tribune Broadcasting acquired channel 26. Protter admitted to Mark Lorando of The Times-Picayune that one reason he had bought into New Orleans was a feeling that WGNO under its previous owners was underperforming; Tribune turned out to be much stiffer competition than anticipated. After the newspaper printed the "piranhas" quote, the station published an open letter in the newspaper calling its staff a "winning team". Several former employees would later criticize Protter for an extensive use of trade-out deals, in which the station sold advertising in exchange for goods and services instead of cash.

WNOL-TV had a strong ratings performance in 1984 and tied channel 26 in sign-on to sign-off ratings in February 1985; however, the rest of the year would be much weaker. WGNO stepped up its purchases of syndicated programming to counter the channel 38 threat and sought to shore up its children's programming lineup, an area where WNOL-TV had made significant inroads. The New Orleans market, which had been showing double-digit advertising revenue growth, suddenly slowed down as the local economy slumped; meanwhile, Tribune exercised its group buying power to deny WNOL-TV the opportunity to bid on movie packages and syndicated programs. Ratings for channel 38 dropped significantly from February to October 1985, in part because a cash crunch forced the station to restrict its advertising spending, and Protter began to seek out a larger group of independent stations to give channel 38 additional capital and program purchasing power. Rumors swirled of a bankruptcy filing, while the general manager of one of WNOL-TV's competitors said the plan was a "distress sale". Turnover continued unabated; in 20 months of operation, some 60 to 70 employees departed, including the entire sales department.

=== TVX ownership ===
Into this void stepped TVX Broadcast Group, a chain of independent stations based in Virginia Beach, Virginia. TVX agreed in December 1985 to acquire Channel 38 Associates for $13.7 million. The highly cost-conscious company immediately made major budget cuts; the general and limited partners in Channel 38 Associates lost money in the TVX acquisition. It used its group buying power and cost philosophy to reduce the station's expenses in syndicated programming and become competitive in new purchases, while frills were eliminated; Protter and Brekke were dismissed. Meanwhile, the station ceased its original policy of airing movies uncut to match the rest of the company and because TVX was considering New Orleans as a facility for dubbing programming for distribution throughout the group. Additionally, WNOL-TV became the local affiliate of the new Fox network upon its launch on October 9, 1986. By March 1987, TVX had whittled down the WNOL-TV payroll from 57 to 40 employees, close to the company's target of 37 employees (with which it ran most of its stations)—60 percent of them women, including general manager Madelyn Bonnot and two-thirds of the top administrative positions. It even discontinued all-night weekend movies for a time in an effort to cut costs.

TVX made a major purchase in November 1986 when it agreed to acquire five major-market independent stations from Taft Broadcasting. The Taft stations purchase left TVX highly leveraged and highly vulnerable. TVX's bankers, Salomon Brothers, provided the financing for the acquisition and in return held more than 60 percent of the company. The company was to pay Salomon Brothers $200 million on January 1, 1988, and missed the first payment deadline, having been unable to lure investors to its junk bonds even before the Black Monday stock market crash.

While TVX recapitalized by the end of 1988, as a result of its financial difficulties, TVX sought to sell WNOL-TV, which continued to operate in a depressed national and local advertising market. However, it languished, in part because the Protter ownership had saddled the station with a program inventory that was far too large. In 1986, the station had 2,900 titles in its movie library, a number that was pared back to 2,300 by March 1989; it had more syndicated shows than it could air, including Spanish-language cartoons. With the station still up for sale, Fox began an upturn; in July 1989, channel 38 had managed to tie channel 26 again in total-day ratings.

=== Quincy Jones ownership ===
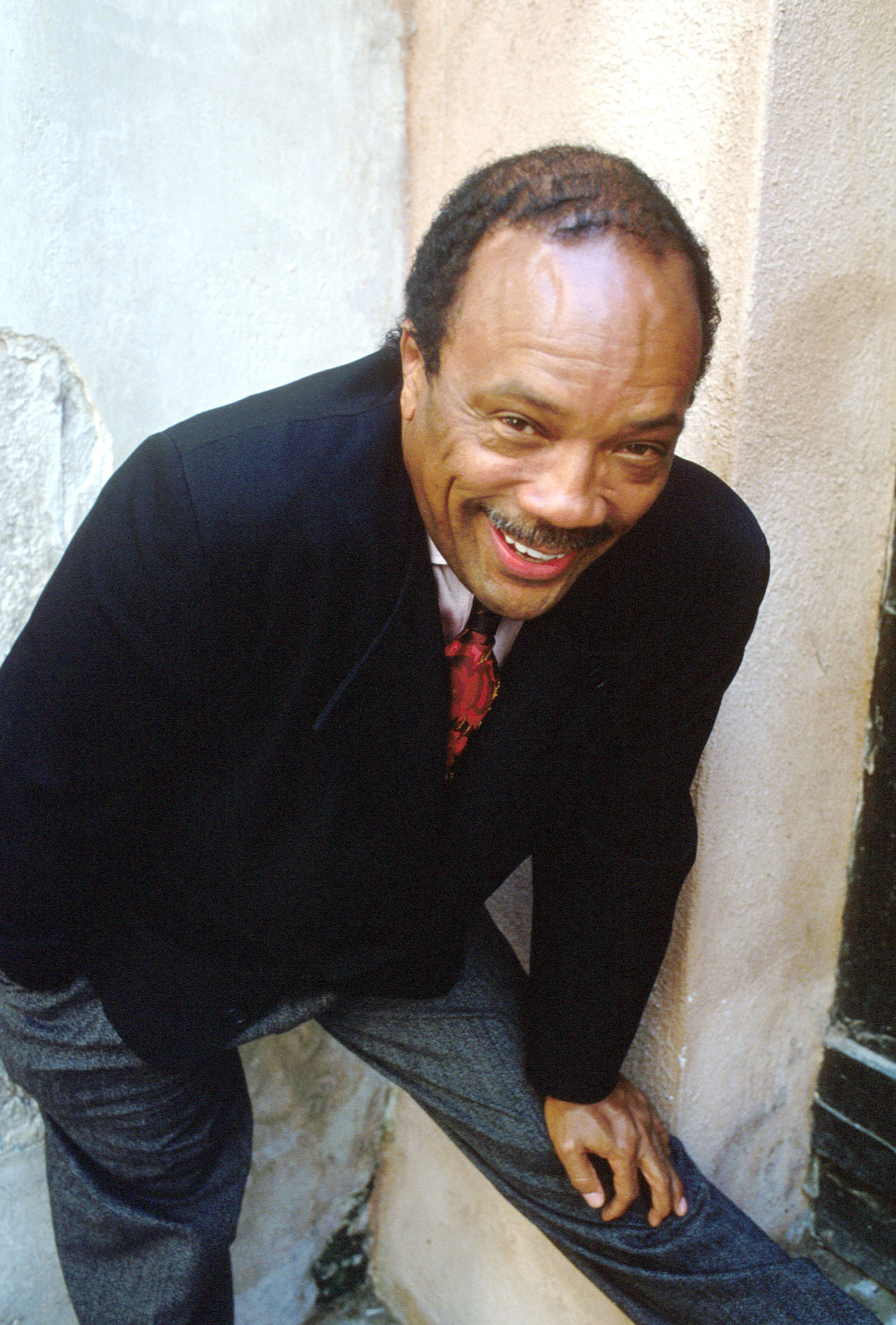
Quincy Jones in 1989, the year he acquired WNOL-TV

In September 1989, TVX announced an agreement to sell WNOL-TV to musician Quincy Jones, marking his entrance into television station ownership. The Quincy Jones acquisition was financed by Time Warner as part of a joint venture, Quincy Jones Entertainment Company.

Quincy Jones launched a large public service campaign focused on education, Great Expectations, in late 1991. In ratings, channel 38 continued to tie channel 26 in full-day ratings and beat it in prime time.

=== Loss of Fox affiliation and switch to The WB ===
After Fox's May 1994 alignment with New World Communications, which kickstarted several years of affiliation changes nationally, the possibility was raised that WNOL could lose Fox to one of the three very high frequency (VHF) commercial stations in New Orleans. Those worries came as one of those stations—WVUE—was put up for sale by its owner, Burnham Broadcasting. WVUE had already been reported to have rejected advances by Fox prior to going on the market.

On August 25, 1994, it was announced that SF Broadcasting—a partnership with minority-owned communications firm Savoy Pictures in which Fox held a minority stake—would acquire three Burnham stations, including WVUE. This immediately set up an affiliation switch in the New Orleans market and left two stations—WNOL and WGNO—seeking the ABC affiliation. While Quincy Jones met with leaders of Capital Cities/ABC in Los Angeles at the start of September, talks reached an impasse, reportedly over the fact that Time Warner was an equity investor; at the time, Time Warner was preparing to start The WB, a new national network, in January 1995. After Jones returned, several WNOL advertising staffers applied for jobs at WGNO, already under the impression that their station would not be the ABC affiliate. In a September 18 article, Lorando told ABC that it need not bother announcing WGNO as its new affiliate because "everybody already knows".

Tribune's role became even larger when Jones restructured his broadcasting interests in a deal announced in November 1994. Quincy Jones, along with partners Willie Davis, Don Cornelius, and Geraldo Rivera, became the majority owners of a new company, Qwest Broadcasting. Qwest would own WNOL-TV and buy WATL in Atlanta, with Bonnot heading television station operations. Tribune would own up to 45 percent of the company and provide back-office management services in New Orleans and Atlanta, both markets where Tribune already owned stations. Meanwhile, FCC approval of the SF Broadcasting purchase was delayed by more than a year because of a commission inquiry as to whether Fox was a foreign-owned company as a result of Rupert Murdoch's interest. However, ABC opted to strike first. On August 10, 1995, WGNO was finally announced as the new ABC affiliate in New Orleans beginning in 1996.

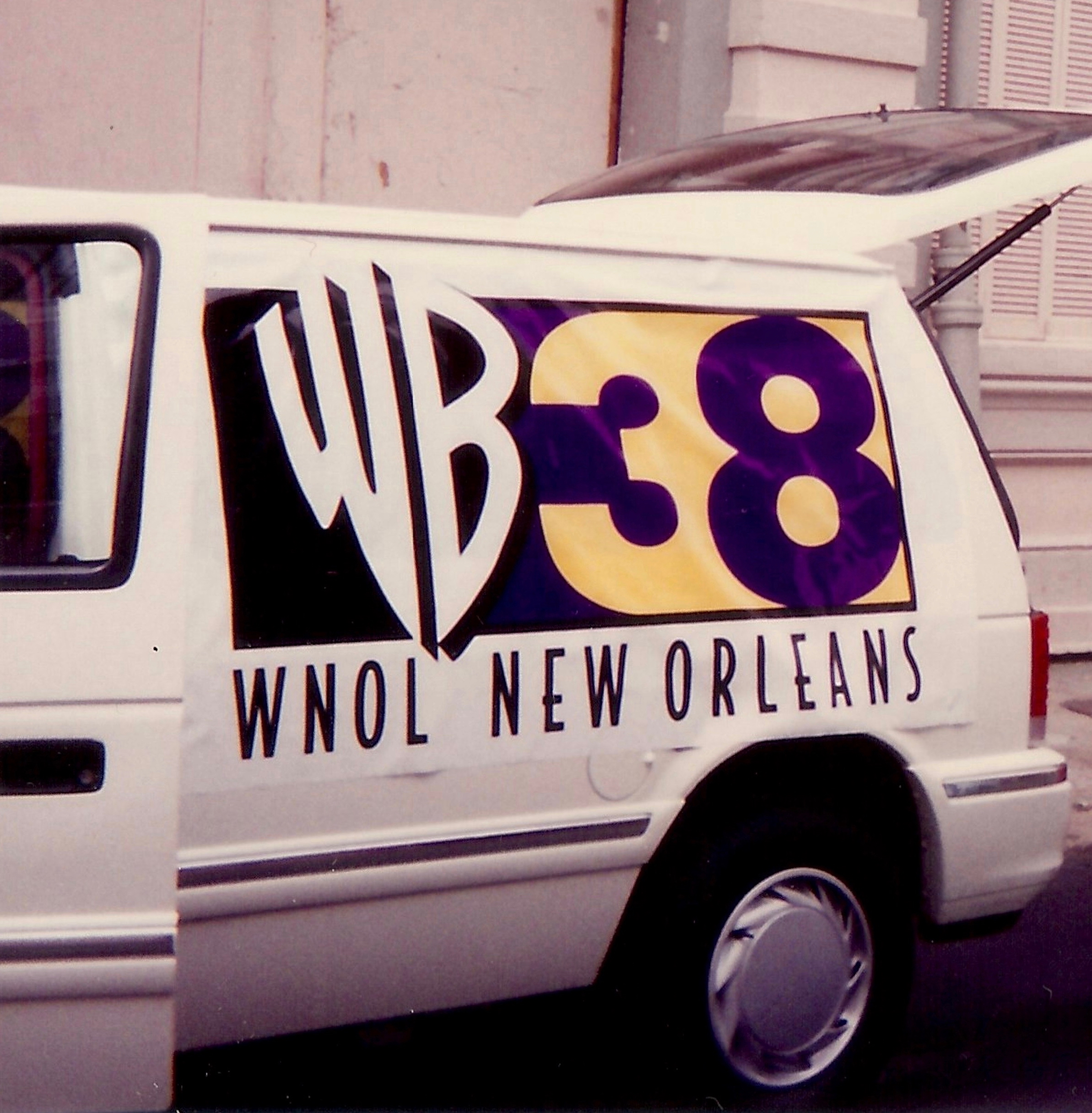
WNOL van with WB logo, April 1996

The New Orleans affiliation switch took place on January 1, 1996. At that time, Fox moved to WVUE; ABC moved to WGNO; and WNOL picked up The WB, which had been on channel 26. Despite exchanging the Fox lineup for the lower-rated WB shows, the station's total-day ratings remained unchanged over the year before. The station also found high ratings from its classic sitcoms, which in some cases outrated newscasts on competing stations.

In August 1999, WNOL-TV relocated from the Canal Street offices to a 23,000-square-foot (2,100 m^{2}) space on the third floor of the New Orleans Centre shopping mall, a $5.5 million investment. The station's syndicated sitcoms were competing with and occasionally beating local news on the other stations. For the shopping mall, it was an attempt to attract customers to the center's lightly trafficked third floor.

=== Tribune Broadcasting ownership ===
On November 15, 1999, the FCC allowed the outright ownership of duopolies—two stations in one market. Qwest Broadcasting's various partners had serious disagreements as to the company's direction, and the rule change allowed Tribune to buy WNOL-TV and WATL outright, paying $95 million for the 67 percent of the company it did not own. In WNOL-TV, Tribune acquired the fourth-highest-rated WB affiliate in the nation.

The stations were combined under WGNO's general manager; channel 38 began to air prime time news breaks promoting WGNO's late newscasts, and Tribune also began to analyze how to put the two stations under one roof, with WGNO in the World Trade Center and WNOL in the New Orleans Centre. The duopoly also represented renewed interest in New Orleans for Tribune, which had previously sought to sell WGNO.

WNOL and WGNO did not operate from the same facility until July 2005, when channel 26 moved from the 28th and 29th floors of the World Trade Center to the New Orleans Centre, where their footprint expanded to 36,000 square feet (3,300 m^{2}). The relocation and installation of new transmitters at Chalmette were an investment of nearly $10 million.

==== Hurricane Katrina ====
Hurricane Katrina devastated the New Orleans area in August 2005 and led to years of operational challenges for WGNO and WNOL. Even though the New Orleans Centre was only flooded on the first floor, it never reopened. Both stations' transmitters were a loss, submerged by six feet (1.8 m) of flooding and with a small alligator and fish found stuck in a fence; a digital transmitter from Tribune-owned WTIC-TV in Hartford, Connecticut, was converted to analog use and shipped to New Orleans, and WGNO was temporarily broadcast in digital form by WPXL-TV. Tribune had already restored a signal for satellite viewers by moving master control for the stations to Indianapolis and Chicago. The WB donated $100,000 to help WNOL employees. WGNO–WNOL set up facilities in two double-wide trailers and moved its business operations to Covington; this followed six weeks in which WGNO's newscasts were aired from fellow ABC affiliate WBRZ-TV in Baton Rouge. The stations moved back to the World Trade Center in April 2006. Amidst this turmoil, WNOL-TV changed networks when The WB and UPN merged to form The CW in September 2006; 16 of Tribune's WB affiliates, including channel 38, were announced as The CW stations when the network was revealed that January.

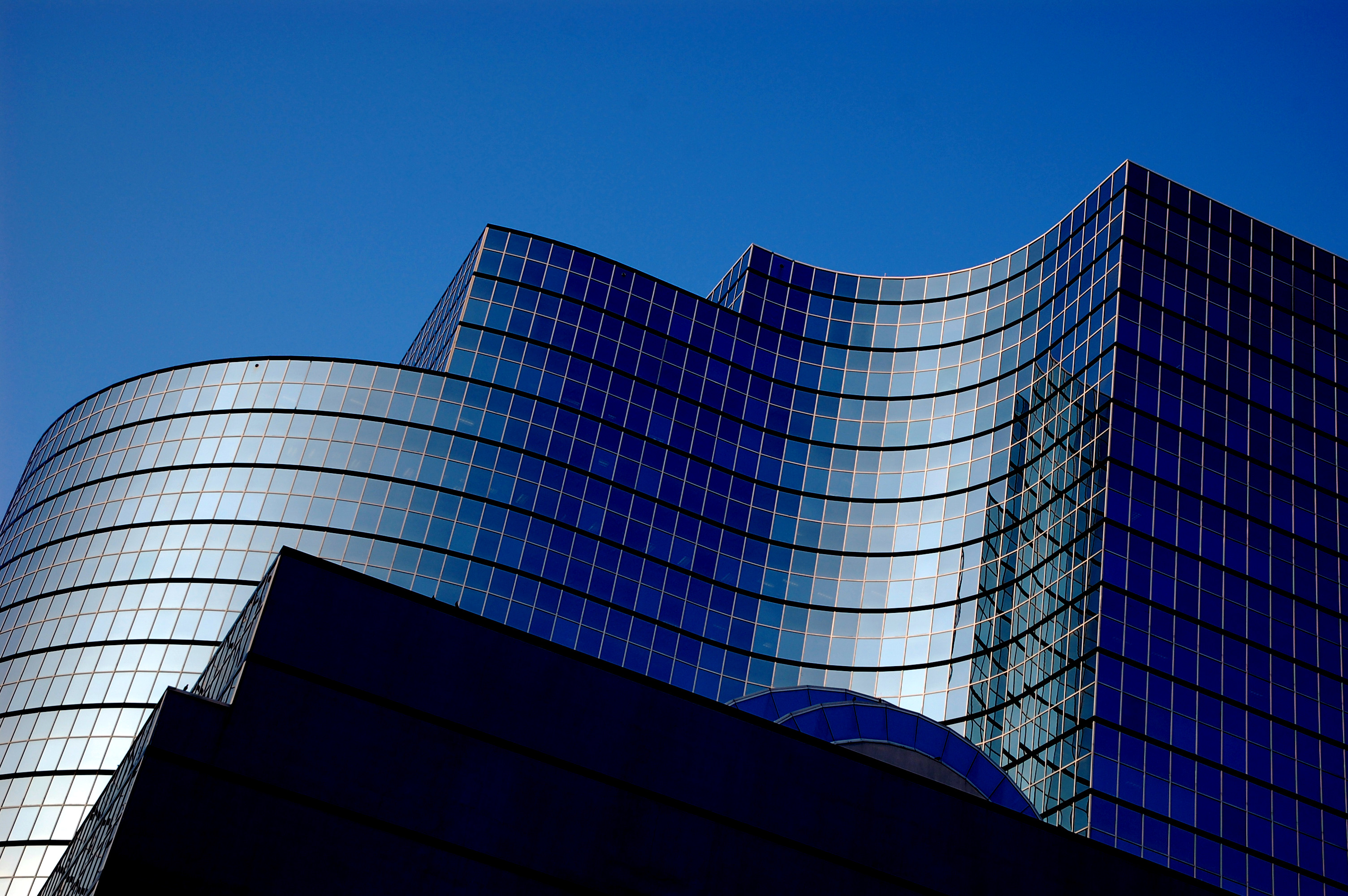
The Galleria in Metairie has housed WGNO and WNOL since 2007.

The Trade Center was only a temporary solution. In August 2007, Tribune officially moved to The Galleria in Metairie. Work also began on restoring digital broadcast facilities. WGNO had been assigned channel 15 for digital use and WNOL channel 40, but after Katrina, Tribune opted to rebuild WNOL on channel 15—broadcasting both stations—and convert WGNO to digital on channel 26 at the analog transition, sharing a site with WDSU.

==== Newscast ====
WGNO began producing a half-hour prime time newscast at 9 p.m. for WNOL-TV on May 1, 2006; news had been planned for a number of years under Tribune management. The weeknight-only newscast competed against a longer established hour-long in-house newscast on Fox affiliate WVUE and gained a competitor in June 2007, when WUPL (channel 54) began airing a half-hour prime time newscast produced by WWL-TV (channel 4) in that time slot. The program suffered from dismal ratings, which resulted in the cancellation of the newscast after a four-year run; the program aired for the last time on June 4, 2010, as part of a refocus to emphasize the station's syndicated sitcom reruns. The next Monday, June 7, the station shifted to airing CW programming from 8 to 10 p.m. instead of 7 to 9 p.m.

=== Sale to Nexstar ===
After Sinclair Broadcast Group's attempt to purchase Tribune failed in 2018, Tribune was acquired by Nexstar Media Group of Irving, Texas, in 2019 for $6.4 billion in cash and debt.

Nexstar acquired Tegna—owner of WWL-TV and WUPL—in a deal announced in August 2025 and completed on March 19, 2026. As part of the transaction, Nexstar committed to the divestiture of WUPL within two years, along with five other stations, mostly in markets where the two companies combined held four TV station licenses. A temporary restraining order issued one week later by the U.S. District Court for the Eastern District of California, later escalated to a preliminary injunction, has prevented WWL and WUPL from being integrated into WNOL and WGNO.

== Technical information and subchannels ==
WNOL-TV's transmitter is located in Chalmette, Louisiana. The station's signal is multiplexed:

Subchannels of WNOL-TV
Subchannel	Res.	Short name	Programming
38.1	1080i	WNOL-DT	The CW
38.2	480i	GRIT	Grit
38.3	480i	Charge!	Charge!
38.4	480i	CometTV	Comet
54.1	1080i	WUPL-HD	WUPL (Independent with MyNetworkTV)

Broadcast on behalf of another station

The 54.1 subchannel of WUPL is broadcast on WNOL-TV as part of the market's ATSC 3.0 (NextGen TV) deployment plan. WUPL began broadcasting in ATSC 3.0 on December 15, 2022.
