= WUPL =

Television station in Slidell, Louisiana

ATSC 3.0 station
- Slidell–New Orleans, Louisiana; United States
- City: Slidell, Louisiana
- Channels: Digital: 17 (UHF); Virtual: 54
- Branding: WUPL 54

Programming
- Affiliations: 54.1: Independent with MyNetworkTV; for others, see § Subchannels

Ownership
- Owner: Tegna Inc., a subsidiary of Nexstar Media Group (sale pending to an unknown third party); (Belo TV, Inc.)
- Sister stations: WWL-TV; Nexstar: WGNO, WNOL-TV

History
- Founded: November 21, 1994
- First air date: June 1, 1995
- Former channel numbers: Analog: 54 (UHF, 1995–2009); Digital: 24 (UHF, 2004–2020)
- Former affiliations: UPN (1995–2006)
- Call sign meaning: "UPN Louisiana"

Technical information
- Licensing authority: FCC
- Facility ID: 13938
- ERP: 850 kW
- HAAT: 295.8 m (970 ft)
- Transmitter coordinates: 29°54′22.9″N 90°2′22.1″W
- Translator(s): WBXN-CD 36 New Orleans

Links
- Public license information: Public file; LMS
- Website: www.wwltv.com/mytv

WUPL (channel 54) is a television station licensed to Slidell, Louisiana, United States, serving the New Orleans area. It is programmed primarily as an independent station, but maintains a secondary affiliation with MyNetworkTV. WUPL is owned by the Tegna subsidiary of Nexstar Media Group alongside CBS affiliate WWL-TV (channel 4); Nexstar also owns ABC affiliate WGNO (channel 26) and CW station WNOL-TV (channel 38). WUPL and WWL-TV share studios on Rampart Street in the historic French Quarter district; WUPL's transmitter is located on Cooper Road in Terrytown, Louisiana.

== History ==
=== As a UPN affiliate ===
The station first signed on the air on June 1, 1995, as an affiliate of the United Paramount Network (UPN). It was owned by Texas broadcaster Larry Safir via his company, Middle America Communications. Safir also owned Univision affiliate KNVO in the Rio Grande Valley. Prior to the station's sign-on, WHNO (channel 20) was approached by UPN for an affiliation, though WHNO's then-owner LeSEA Broadcasting declined all netlet offers on their stations through the country, as the programming planned for both UPN and competitor The WB conflicted with the company's core programming values; as a result, UPN programming was not available in the New Orleans market for the 4 1/2 months prior to WUPL's debut. Along with programming from UPN, the station ran a general entertainment format, offering vintage off-network sitcoms, talk shows, court shows and other syndicated programs. In 1996, Safir entered a deal with Cox Enterprises to take over operations of the station, and in 1997, he sold the station to the Paramount Stations Group subsidiary of Viacom; as a result, WUPL became a UPN owned-and-operated station (Viacom launched UPN in a programming partnership with Chris-Craft Industries/United Television, and acquired a 50% interest in the network from Chris-Craft/United in 1996).

Viacom merged with CBS in 2000. Despite Viacom's ownership of WUPL, the market's CBS affiliation remained on WWL-TV (channel 4), the highest-rated television station in New Orleans and one of CBS's strongest affiliates for over 20 years. Viacom briefly considered buying WWL-TV, in which it would create a duopoly with WUPL. However, after Belo Corporation turned down Viacom's offer to buy the station, Viacom decided instead to sell WUPL to Belo in July 2005 for $14.5 million.

=== As a MyNetworkTV affiliate ===
On January 24, 2006, Time Warner and CBS Corporation (the latter of which took over WUPL and UPN after Viacom split into two companies one month earlier) announced that both companies would partner to launch The CW, which would replace The WB and UPN; the network, which debuted on September 18, 2006, would feature a mix of programs carried over from its two predecessor networks as well as newer series. The day of the announcement of the network's formation, Tribune Broadcasting signed a ten-year agreement to affiliate the network with 16 of the group's 19 WB affiliates; as a result, WNOL-TV (channel 38) was announced as The CW's New Orleans affiliate.

Three weeks later, on February 9, CBS filed a lawsuit against Belo Corporation over the failure to finalize the sale of WUPL to Belo. The deal was slated to close by the end of 2005, but was placed on hold when Hurricane Katrina devastated the New Orleans metropolitan area in late August of that year. Though the lawsuit provided some doubt as to its future affiliation, on July 12, 2006, it was announced that WUPL would become an affiliate of MyNetworkTV. Since News Corporation owns Fox and MyNetworkTV, CBS originally relented on allowing any of its UPN affiliates to affiliate with the new network because The CW did not affiliate with any of News Corporation's UPN stations (CBS and Time Warner instead chose Tribune and CBS Television Stations as The CW's core station groups, with Tribune getting affiliations in the three largest markets of New York City, Los Angeles and Chicago among other markets, along with Tribune's WNOL-TV in New Orleans).

On February 26, 2007, Belo announced that it would go forward with the purchase of WUPL from CBS. A Belo press release also said the sale—which had already received FCC approval—"settles litigation between Belo and CBS over the purchase that arose after Hurricane Katrina". At that time, Belo closed on WUPL, and later acquired its low-power repeater, WBXN-CA (channel 18; previously a separate station, K10NG, affiliated with The Box and later MTV2) on April 20, 2007. Before then, WUPL was one of two television stations in New Orleans at the time that whose ownership held interest in a major network (the other was former WB affiliate WNOL-TV, owned by that network's part-owner, the Tribune Company), and the only one to be a network owned-and-operated station.

In mid-April 2007, Belo moved WUPL's operations into WWL-TV's facility on Rampart Street. On June 13, 2013, the Gannett Company announced that it would acquire Belo for $1.5 billion. The sale was completed on December 23.

On June 29, 2015, the Gannett Company split in two, with one side specializing in print media and the other side specializing in broadcast and digital media. WWL and WUPL were retained by the latter company, named Tegna. In April 2018, WUPL dropped the "My 54" branding and rebranded under its call letters as "WUPL 54", adopting a logo based on that of its parent station.

Nexstar Media Group, owner of WGNO (channel 26) and WNOL-TV, acquired Tegna in a deal announced in August 2025 and completed on March 19, 2026. As part of the transaction, Nexstar committed to the divestiture of WUPL within two years, along with five other stations, mostly in markets where the two companies combined held four TV station licenses.

== Programming ==
Occasionally as time permits, WUPL may air CBS network programs whenever WWL-TV is unable to in the event of extended breaking news or severe weather coverage.

On April 4, 2005, WUPL began carrying CBS' morning program The Early Show in lieu of WWL-TV, which preempted the program in the late 1980s (as CBS This Morning) in favor of running an extended weekday morning newscast (which as of 2014, runs for 4 1/2 hours); WUPL also carried the syndicated morning news and talk program The Daily Buzz until 2012, pairing that program and CBS' morning news programs under the umbrella brand "My Morning News". WUPL subsequently picked up CBS This Morning when that program replaced The Early Show in January 2012 (WWL-TV, however, carried that program's Saturday edition as the station did not air local newscasts on weekend mornings at the time). However, this changed on December 5, 2016, as WWL picked up CBS This Morning for the entire two hours (likely due to a corporate mandate from Tegna in order to satisfy their CBS affiliation agreements), while WUPL now carries the 7–9 a.m. block of Eyewitness Morning News (it also now simulcasts all 4 1/2 hours of the newscast).

=== Newscasts ===
WWL-TV began producing a half-hour prime time newscast at 9 p.m. for WUPL on June 4, 2007. Titled My54 Eyewitness News at 9, it competed against WVUE (channel 8)'s longer established and hour-long in-house newscast as well as a WGNO-produced half-hour prime time newscast on CW affiliate WNOL-TV. The newscast featured the same anchor team as that seen on Eyewitness News Nightwatch, WWL-TV's 10 p.m. newscast. Unlike the 9 p.m. newscast on WVUE, the WUPL newscast aired only on Monday through Friday evenings. The WNOL newscast was canceled after the June 4, 2010, edition due to low ratings; by that time, the WWL-produced newscast on WUPL had passed the WNOL newscast at a distant second in the timeslot, behind WVUE. In September 2010, WWL-TV began broadcasting its newscasts in 16:9 widescreen standard definition; the WUPL newscast was included in the upgrade.

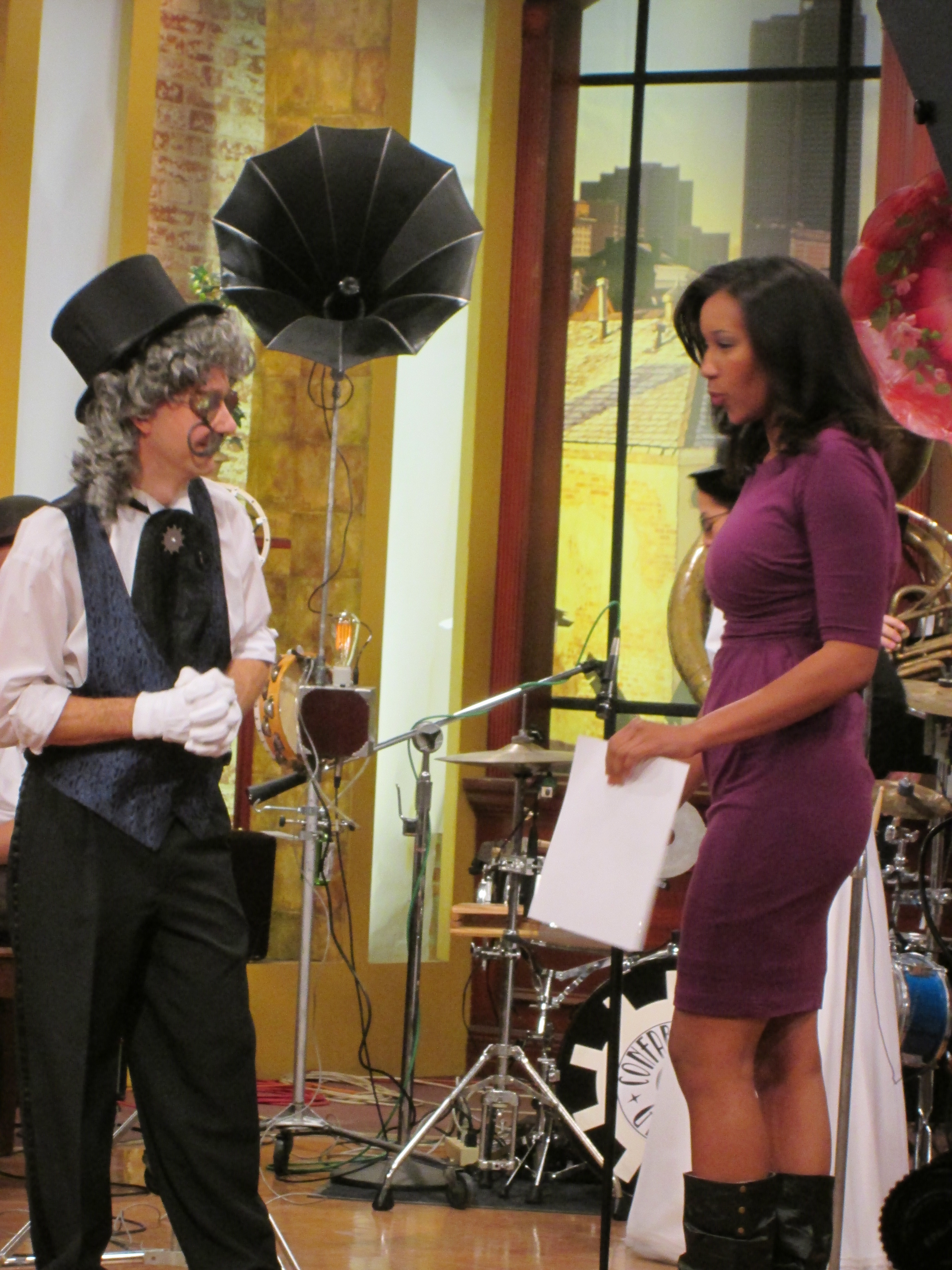
Sheba Turk (right) interviews a guest on the set of The 504, 2013.

The WWL-produced 9 p.m. newscast ended its run on WUPL after the April 26, 2013, edition, having been canceled due to consistently low ratings; three days later on April 29, the program was replaced by The 504, a pre-recorded interview show originally hosted by WWL-TV weekday morning co-anchor Melanie Hebert; it was hosted by Sheba Turk, who was a WWL morning anchor until relocating to KCBS-TV/KCAL-TV in 2023. Newscasts returned to WUPL on September 9, 2014, with the debut of a half-hour weeknight 6:30 p.m. newscast produced by WWL.

== Technical information ==
=== Subchannels ===
The station's ATSC 1.0 channels are carried on the multiplexed signals of other New Orleans television stations:

Subchannels provided by WUPL (ATSC 1.0)
Subchannel	Res.	Short name	Programming	ATSC 1.0 host
54.1	720p	WUPL-HD	Main WUPL programming	WNOL-TV
54.2	480i	Quest	Quest	WGNO
54.3	480i	H & I	Heroes & Icons	WGNO
54.4	480i	TruCrim	True Crime Network	WDSU
54.5	480i	Cozi	Cozi TV	WVUE-DT

WUPL added MundoMax to its second digital subchannel in 2014 and Heroes & Icons to its third subchannel in 2015. When MundoMax went dark on November 30, 2016, WUPL duplicated its main feed on its second subchannel until the addition of the newly-launched Quest network in late January 2018.

=== Analog-to-digital conversion ===
WUPL shut down its analog signal, over UHF channel 54, on June 12, 2009, the official date on which full-power television stations in the United States transitioned from analog to digital broadcasts under federal mandate. The station's digital signal continued to broadcast on its pre-transition UHF channel 24, using virtual channel 54.

The station carries high definition programming in the 1080i resolution format rather than in 720p, MyNetworkTV's default HD resolution format, as WWL-TV (and the majority of the former Belo stations, regardless of network affiliation) carries its HD programming in the 1080i format.

=== ATSC 3.0 ===
Subchannels of WUPL (ATSC 3.0)
Subchannel	Res.	Short name	Programming
4.1	1080p	WWL-HD	CBS (WWL-TV)
6.1	1080p	WDSU DT	NBC (WDSU)
8.1	1080p	FOX 8 H	Fox (WVUE-DT)
8.20	1080p		GameLoop (WVUE-DT)
26.1	1080p	WGNO-DT	ABC (WGNO)
38.1	1080p	WNOL-DT	The CW (WNOL-TV)
54.1	1080p	WUPL-HD	Main WUPL programming

Subchannel broadcast with digital rights management
Subchannel streamed via the Internet
