= Consulate-General of Japan, Nashville =

Japanese diplomatic mission in Nashville, Tennessee

Consulate-General of Japan, Nashville 在ナッシュビル日本国総領事館
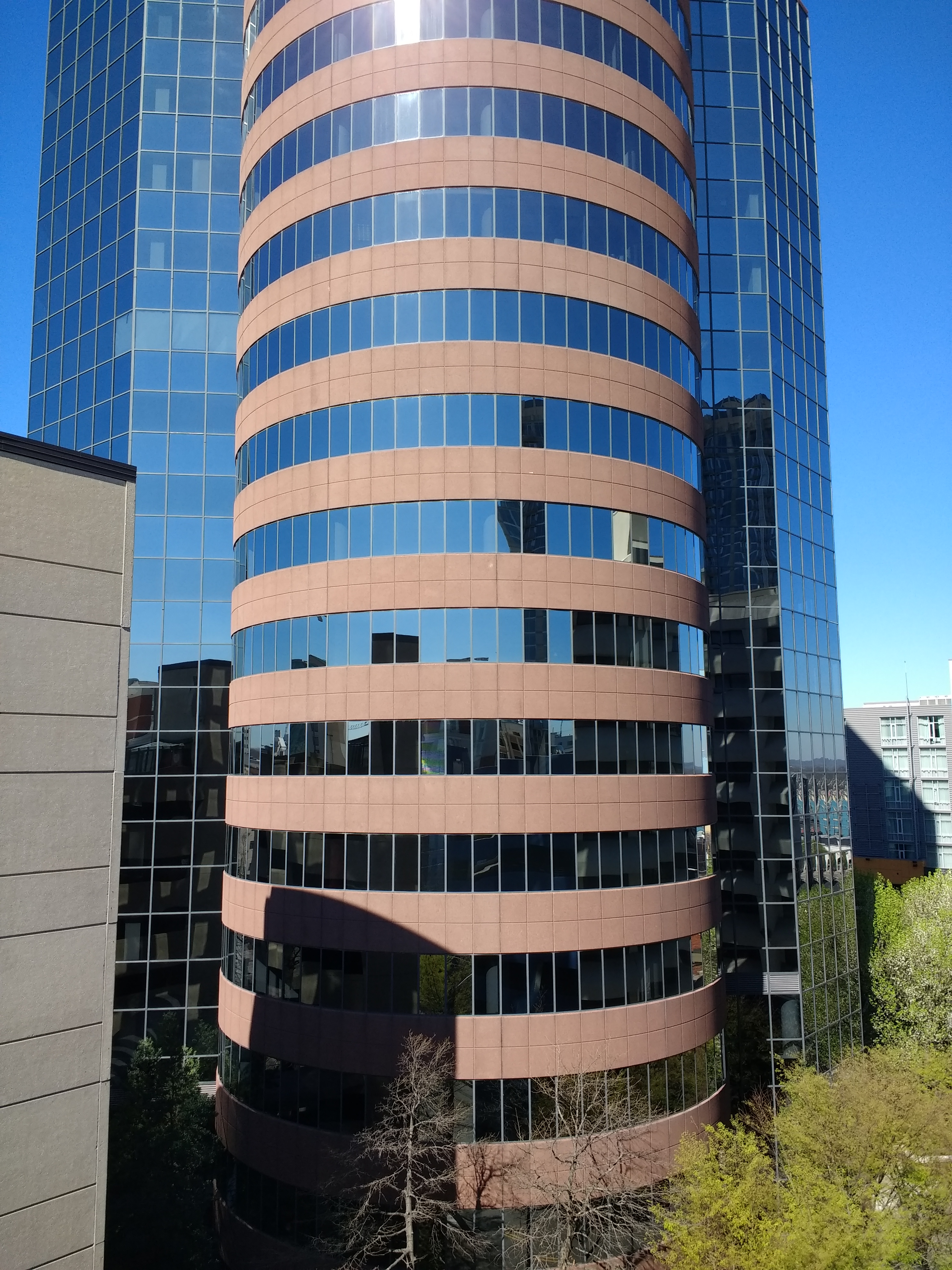
- Palmer Plaza, location of the Consulate-General of Japan, Nashville
- Location: Nashville, Tennessee, United States
- Address: 1801 West End Avenue, Suite 900
- Coordinates: 36°09′09″N 86°47′45″W
- Website: https://www.nashville.us.emb-japan.go.jp/itprtop_en/index.html

The Consulate-General of Japan, Nashville (在ナッシュビル日本国総領事館, Zai Nasshubiru Nippon-koku Sōryōjikan) is a diplomatic facility of Japan. It is located in Suite 900 of Palmer Plaza in Nashville, Tennessee. Its jurisdiction includes the U.S. states of Tennessee, Arkansas, Kentucky, Louisiana, and Mississippi.

== History ==
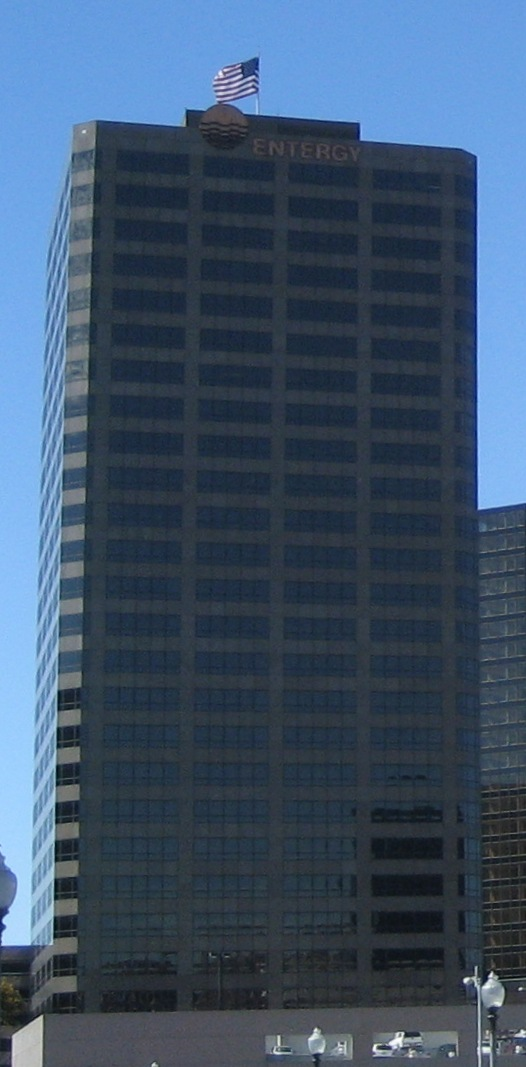
Entergy Tower in New Orleans, the former location of the consulate

The consulate was originally the Consulate-General of Japan, New Orleans (在ニュー・オルリンズ日本国総領事館, Zai Nyū Orurinzu Nippon-koku Sōryōjikan). It first opened in 1922. New Orleans, located at the mouth of the Mississippi River, served as a hub for grain shipments originating from the Midwestern United States and the cotton trade. Kimberly Quillen of The Times-Picayune said that this fact made a New Orleans location "an obvious choice for a home." Prior to the move to Tennessee, it was located in the Entergy Tower in the Central Business District of New Orleans.

Yutaka Horiba, an economics professor at Tulane University, said that while the State of Louisiana had focused on establishing relationships with the oil and gas industry, the states of Kentucky and Tennessee had made attempts to establish relations with Japan for a period of several decades before 2007; Horiba believed that this weakened the relationship between Louisiana and the Government of Japan. In 2006 Dominique Thormann, a senior vice president with Nissan, told journalists in Washington DC that the Japanese government planned to move the consulate to Nashville. Koichi Funayama, who was serving as the consul-general in New Orleans, said that according to a 2005 survey, the states of Kentucky and Tennessee had over 200 Japanese companies. The headquarters of Nissan North America is in Greater Nashville, and the Nashville location is in proximity to Georgetown, Kentucky, which has a manufacturing plant of Toyota.

The Japanese government prepared the move of the consulate for over one year. During that time lawmakers from Louisiana unsuccessfully asked the Japanese government to keep the consulate in New Orleans. The Japanese government had plans to assign an honorary consul to New Orleans.

For the first nine months of 2007, Japan took over $2 billion worth of Louisiana-origin goods, making it the state's second largest export market. Zeh-Noh Grain Corp., a U.S. subsidiary of Zen-Noh, operates one of the largest grain elevators in Louisiana. As of 2007 many Japanese tourists visit Louisiana for the music.

== See also ==
- Tennessee Meiji Gakuin High School (a Japanese international senior high school in Tennessee)
- Consulate-General of Japan, Atlanta
- Consulate-General of Japan, Detroit
- Consulate-General of Japan, Honolulu
- Consulate-General of Japan, Houston
- Diplomatic missions of Japan
