= Champions Square =

Plaza in New Orleans, Louisiana

Coordinates: 29°57′00″N 90°04′41″W

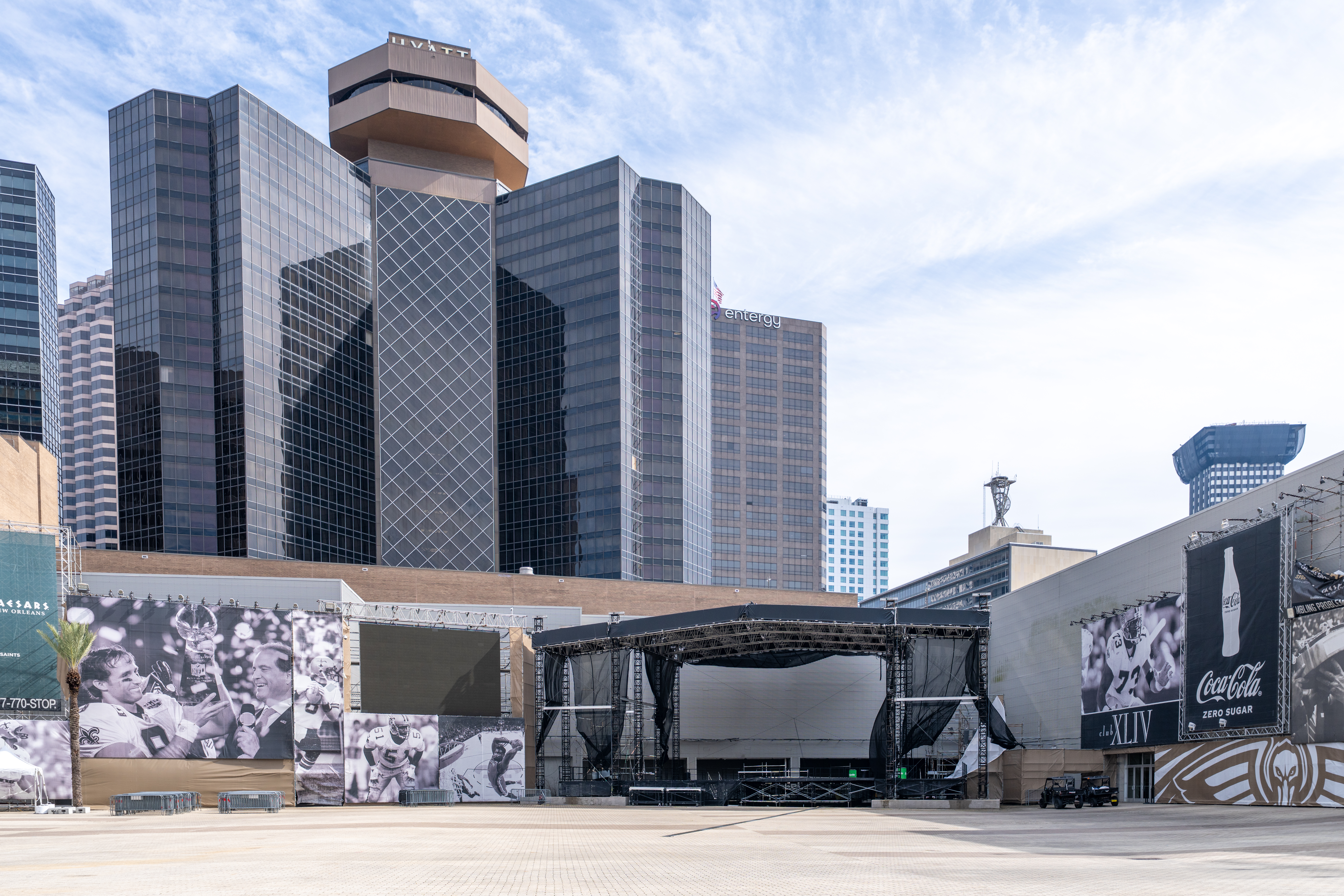
- Champions Square (2026)
- Interactive map of Champions Square
- Full name: Champions Square presented by Verizon
- Address: LaSalle Street; New Orleans, LA 70113
- Location: Central Business District
- Owner: Zelia, LLC (leased by the Louisiana Stadium and Exposition District)
- Operator: ASM Global
- Capacity: 9,000

Construction
- Opened: August 21, 2010
- Renovated: 2013
- Cost: $13.5 million ($19.9 million in 2025 dollars)
- Architects: Eskew+Dumez+Ripple and Ellerbe Becket
- Project manager: Aries Group
- Services engineer: AECOM
- General contractors: Broadmoor, LLC
- Main contractor: Gibbs Construction

Website
- Venue Website

Champions Square is an outdoor festival plaza located adjacent to Caesars Superdome in New Orleans, Louisiana. It is known as the premier tailgating space for sports events held at the stadium and the nearby Smoothie King Center.

The plaza also consists of an outdoor amphitheater, known as Bold Sphere Music (often referred to as "Blue Sphere Stage"). The venue was reopened April 25, 2014, with a concert by Lana Del Rey.

The amphitheater has seating for up to 9,000 spectators for special events, 7,000 in a general admission setting and 4,500 for reseated seating.

== History ==
The site was originally the location of the Girod Street Cemetery from 1822 to 1957. The cemetery was moved prior to the construction of the Superdome, and subsequently the New Orleans Centre shopping mall was erected on the site. In 2005, the shopping mall closed due to Hurricane Katrina. The shopping mall never re-opened, and was almost entirely demolished in the Spring of 2010 to begin construction of Champions Square. The former Macy's department store area and the parking garage, now called "Champions Garage", are the only remnants of the original shopping mall.

== Features ==
The 121,000 square-foot plaza is centered on the Caesars Superdome, Smoothie King Center, Hyatt Regency, Benson Tower, and numerous parking garages and food courts. Phase I included the construction of the plaza and staircase leading from the Superdome. Construction initially began in the Spring of 2010 and Champions Square formally opened August 21, 2010.

Phase II further improved the square following the 2010-2011 NFL season with the installation of a new permanent grand staircase with amphitheater seating, permanent restroom facilities, stone pavement, LED lighting, palm trees, and a vine wall spanning the length of the plaza alongside the Superdome.

Before each NFL football game, the square hosts concerts which are free and open to the public. The square is only open to pedestrian traffic. Inside the square, there are numerous food and beverage options either in the food court or outside under tents.

Champions Square has become the site for the annual "Gleason Gras", whose purpose is to raise awareness and funds for amyotrophic lateral sclerosis (ALS).

It was the original home of Lil Wayne's hometown festival, Lil’ WeezyAna Fest, for its first years before it moved to Smoothie King Center.

== Future expansion ==
In 2013 construction was completed on a four level balcony added to the southern side Benson Tower overlooking the square. The addition also houses a secondary studio for the Benson-owned Fox station WVUE-DT (Channel 8), which airs their morning newscasts, Saints and sports-related programming from that facility.

The Times-Picayune reported on August 15, 2010, that Phase III would include building out the façade and adding a permanent food court, and would be completed sometime after New Orleans hosted Super Bowl XLVII in 2013. Beyond that, planners have envisioned the area will be successful enough to build a residential tower sprouting out of the top of the former Macy's department store space.

== See also ==
- Patriot Place
- L.A. Live
- List of music venues
