= WGNO =

Television station in New Orleans

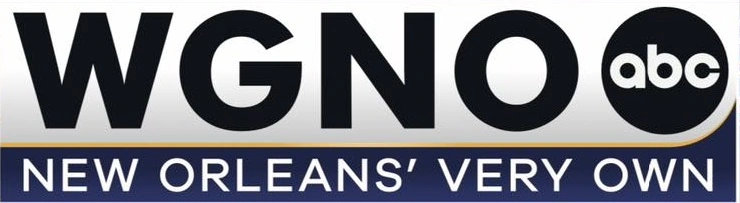

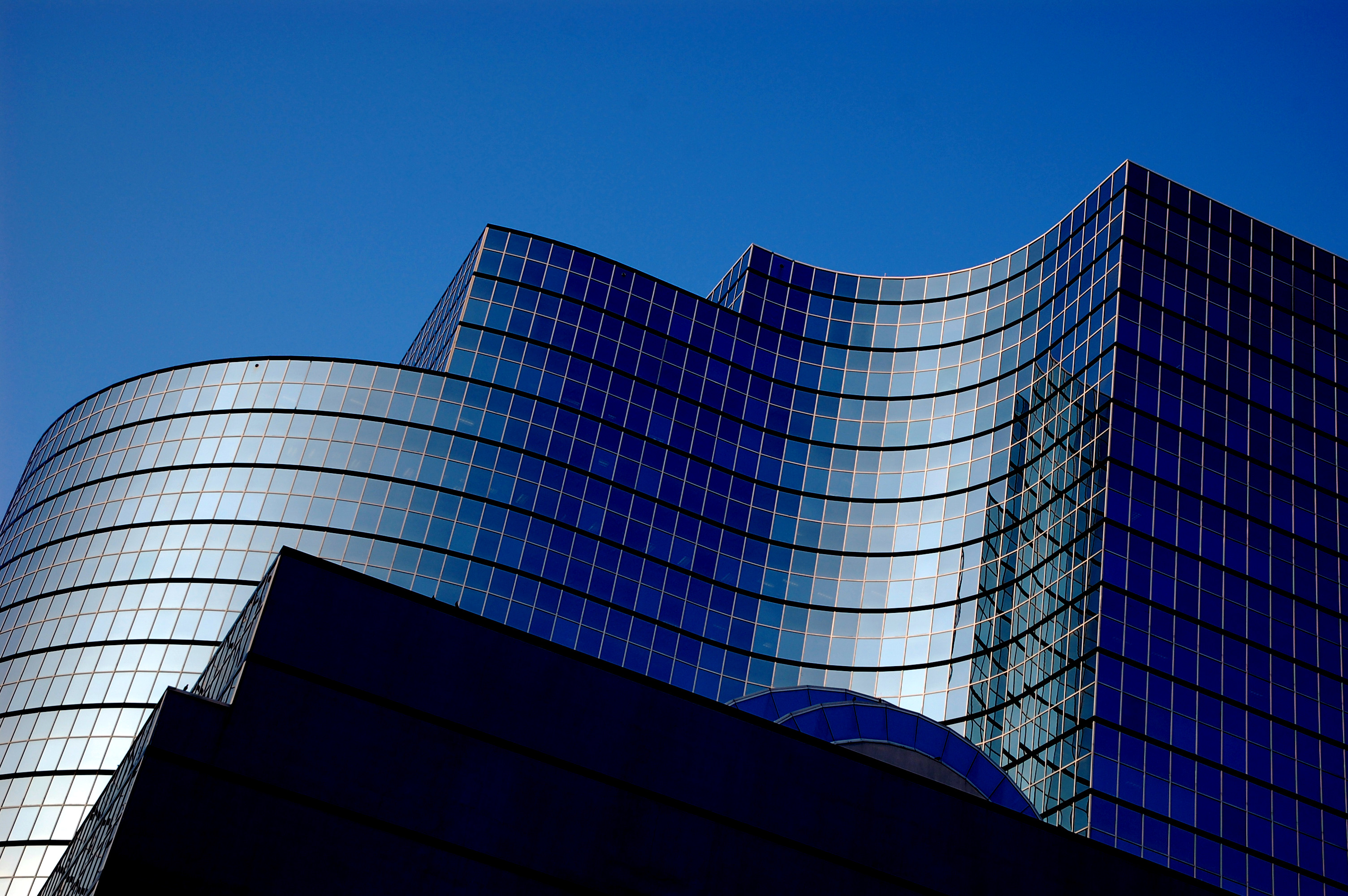
- The Galleria in Metairie has housed WGNO and WNOL since 2007
- New Orleans, Louisiana; United States
- Channels: Digital: 26 (UHF); Virtual: 26
- Branding: WGNO; WGNO News

Programming
- Affiliations: 26.1: ABC; for others, see § Subchannels

Ownership
- Owner: Nexstar Media Group; (Tribune Television New Orleans, Inc.)
- Sister stations: WNOL-TV; Tegna: WWL-TV, WUPL

History
- First air date: October 14, 1967
- Former call signs: WWOM-TV (1967–1972); WGNO-TV (1972–1988)
- Former channel numbers: Analog: 26 (UHF, 1967–2009); Digital: 15 (UHF, 2002–2009)
- Former affiliations: Independent (1967–1995); The WB (1995)
- Call sign meaning: "Greater New Orleans"

Technical information
- Licensing authority: FCC
- Facility ID: 72119
- ERP: 1,000 kW
- HAAT: 286 m (938 ft)
- Transmitter coordinates: 29°57′0″N 89°57′28.0″W

Links
- Public license information: Public file; LMS
- Website: wgno.com

WGNO (channel 26) is a television station in New Orleans, Louisiana, United States, affiliated with ABC. It is owned by Nexstar Media Group alongside CW station WNOL-TV (channel 38); Nexstar's Tegna subsidiary owns WWL-TV (channel 4), a CBS affiliate, and WUPL (channel 54), an independent station with MyNetworkTV. WGNO and WNOL-TV share studios at The Galleria in Metairie; WGNO's transmitter is located in Chalmette, Louisiana.

Channel 26 went on the air October 14, 1967, as WWOM-TV, the first independent station in New Orleans. After being sold in bankruptcy in 1971, the station was renamed WGNO-TV in 1972. For most of its first 16 years on air, the station was known for airing old movies, programs turned down by the local network affiliates, and a series of low-budget local shows. This changed in 1983, when Tribune Broadcasting acquired WGNO-TV; Tribune brought stronger programming purchases, improved local programming, and the resources needed to contend in a market that gained a second major independent station. It was a charter affiliate of The WB in 1995.

The purchase of New Orleans's previous ABC affiliate, WVUE, by a group linked to the Fox network led to an affiliation switch in New Orleans on January 1, 1996, in which ABC programming moved to WGNO. The station also began producing local newscasts, which found some viewers but generally were in fourth-place in the market. Tribune acquired WNOL-TV in 2000, but the stations' operations were not integrated in one facility until July 2005—a month before Hurricane Katrina evicted them from the New Orleans Centre.

In the wake of the hurricane, WGNO lacked permanent studios for two years; it produced local newscasts from a compound of trailers and with anchors reporting from outside for months, but there was little ratings movement. The station changed the format of its evening news programs in 2011 to News with a Twist, mixing news and entertainment features. This lasted until 2020, in the wake of the COVID-19 pandemic and Nexstar's purchase of Tribune. Nexstar purchased Tegna in 2026, placing WWL-TV and WGNO under common ownership.

== History ==
When the Federal Communications Commission (FCC) lifted its four-year freeze on TV station grants in 1952, channel 26 was one of the channels in the new ultra high frequency (UHF) band allotted to the city. There was some initial interest around the channel, such as by the Community Television Corporation (connected with New Orleans radio station WBOK) and by the CKG Television Corporation, an affiliate of radio station WMRY. CKG obtained the construction permit, but it was never built and deleted in 1960.

=== WWOM-TV: Early years ===
WWOM-TV's logo from 1969, showing its attempt to broadcast 24 hours a day, from The Times-Picayune.

After applying in March 1964, Channel 26, Inc., an affiliate of radio stations WWOM (the former WMRY) and WWOM-FM, received a construction permit in July 1965 for channel 26, with studios and transmitter in the International Trade Mart Building. During 1966, some details of WWOM-TV's programming were published: bullfighting from Mexico City, all-night programming on weekends, music programming, and a steady diet of movies, turning the WWOM call letters of "Wonderful World of Music" into "Wonderful World of Movies".

Test patterns were broadcast for the first time on September 27, 1967, and WWOM-TV began programming on October 14, 1967. The first program aired was the 1927 film The Jazz Singer. The debut of an independent station in the market immediately provided flexibility and allowed shows not aired by the network affiliates to be seen in the market. Months after going on the air, WWOM-TV aired the 1968 Winter Olympics after ABC affiliate WVUE was told it had to air them live. It experimented with all-night broadcasting, the first local station to do so, and it also featured the local program Nite People, a late night variety show that turned into the local equivalent of The Gong Show and gained a cult following; after its original run from 1968 to 1970, a revival special was aired in 1987.

=== WGNO-TV: Communications Corporation of the South ownership ===
After three years of operation, in November 1970, Channel 26, Inc. filed for bankruptcy. A trustee was appointed for WWOM-TV, which remained on the air; a representative of United Artists told bankruptcy court that his company was supplying films to channel 26 "to keep the station on the air more or less on faith at this time", and a process began in July 1971 to sell the station's assets. Two bids were initially received for $151,000, but neither were satisfactory to the trustee, who wanted to offer more money to the creditors whose liabilities totaled $1.4 million. One of the original bidders, a consortium of New Orleans investors known as Communications Corporation of the South (CCSI), increased its offer to $300,000 and was accepted; the new owners also announced their intention to repair transmission equipment damaged in a fire and expressed their admiration for the staff's ability to keep channel 26 going "with essentially nothing more than gum and baling wire technique and inadequate equipment". The new owners changed the call sign to WGNO-TV, for "Greater New Orleans", on March 9, 1972.

Mark Lorando, television columnist for The Times-Picayune, described WWOM-TV/WGNO-TV from 1967 to 1983 as "an artfully bad independent station", while one of his predecessors, Benjamin Morrison, noted that its local programming "offered levels of amateurishness previously undreamed of". Local programming during this period included such shows as the music program Homegrown; monthly teen magazine Hey Kids, It's For You; Black Is..., a discussion show about issues in the local Black community; and the Groovy Guru, future WDSU weathercaster and former radio DJ Dan Milham hosting movies. In 1977–78, the station aired twelve road games of the New Orleans Jazz of the NBA; the schedule increased to 25 games in the 1978–79 season, the team's last in New Orleans before moving to Utah.

In 1978, WGNO-TV was purchased by Greater New Orleans Television, a subsidiary of General Media Corporation of Rockford, Illinois, for $4.9 million. (CCSI then invested in New Orleans radio station WWIW.) Under General Media, the station moved its transmitter to a new, purpose-built tower that offered greater height than the International Trade Mart building and provided for a power increase from 500,000 to 2.5 million watts. The station's programming continued to be a mix of local shows of secondary interest, older sitcoms and movies, and religious programs.

From 1982 to 1987, WGNO aired a series of public service announcements featuring a local mime known as Tom Foote; Foote was seen in area schools and in the French Quarter. For a time, the station produced an hour-long program called Tom Foote's Video Clubhouse.

=== Tribune Broadcasting ownership ===
General Media Corporation began to liquidate its assets in late 1982, beginning with its cable system and TV station in Rockford and continuing in April 1983 with the announced sale of WGNO-TV to Tribune Broadcasting for $21 million, a significant return on the $4.9 million General had paid for it five years prior. The new ownership came in time for WGNO-TV to meet its first head-on independent competition in station history. A group led by Hal Protter, Channel 38 Associates, built WNOL-TV, which began broadcasting in March 1984 and immediately had an impact on the market with credible ratings. Protter had bought into the New Orleans market because WGNO-TV had been a comparatively weak station, not anticipating that Tribune would end up being his competitor in the market.

Tribune brought to WGNO its considerable clout as a buyer of programming on the syndication market and its other resources as a company, which it would need to overcome the "shoestring" management style of General Media and face its new competition at WNOL-TV. Stronger programming and equipment were acquired. The company also used its muscle to consolidate WGNO operations within the International Trade Mart. With operations on the 20th, 24th, 28th, and 29th floors, its employees called themselves "elevator people", a moniker brought to an end in 1985 when Tribune consolidated operations on the 28th and 29th floors. As WNOL-TV's ratings declined, WGNO established itself as the leading independent in the market; its early evening syndicated shows were beating WVUE in the ratings. It took until 1989 for WNOL-TV, bolstered by Fox prime-time programming, to tie WGNO again in total-day ratings, a situation that persisted into the early 1990s.

Local programming continued to play a role at channel 26. Real New Orleans, a weekly and later monthly program aired in late nights, debuted in 1990, and the station also had sports programs (Saints Sideline, Hometown Sports Page, Friday Night Football) and a cooking program, Cookin' with Soul. In 1993, the station debuted a new local game show: N.O. It Alls, which was produced by Brandon Tartikoff. Tartikoff, the former head of programming at NBC, had relocated to New Orleans because his daughter was rehabilitating after a car accident. The program continued in production through November 1996 and aired on WGNO through the end of that year. From 1993 (when the team relocated to New Orleans from Denver) through 1995, WGNO served as the over-the-air broadcaster of the American Association's New Orleans Zephyrs (later a member of the Pacific Coast League), carrying a handful of games a year from the minor league baseball franchise.

In November 1993, Tribune committed to the new The WB Television Network, a new service to be launched by Warner Bros. Television in January 1995. Tribune would hold an ownership stake, and six of the company's seven independent stations, including WGNO, would join at launch.

=== Becoming an ABC affiliate ===
Former WGNO logo, used from 2005 to 2011.

On August 25, 1994, it was announced that SF Broadcasting—a partnership with minority-owned communications firm Savoy Pictures in which Fox held a minority stake—would acquire three Burnham stations, including WVUE. This immediately set up an affiliation switch in the New Orleans market and left two stations—WNOL and WGNO—seeking the ABC affiliation. While WNOL-TV owner Quincy Jones met with leaders of Capital Cities/ABC in Los Angeles at the start of September, talks reached an impasse, reportedly over the fact that Warner Bros. parent Time Warner was an equity investor in his company. After Jones returned, several WNOL advertising staffers applied for jobs at WGNO, already under the impression that their station would not be the ABC affiliate. In a September 18 article, Lorando told ABC that it need not bother announcing WGNO as its new affiliate because "everybody already knows". Tribune's involvement with WNOL deepened in November, when Jones and other minority investors formed a new company, Qwest Broadcasting; Tribune would own up to 45 percent of the company and provide back-office management services to its stations in New Orleans and Atlanta, both markets where Tribune already owned stations.

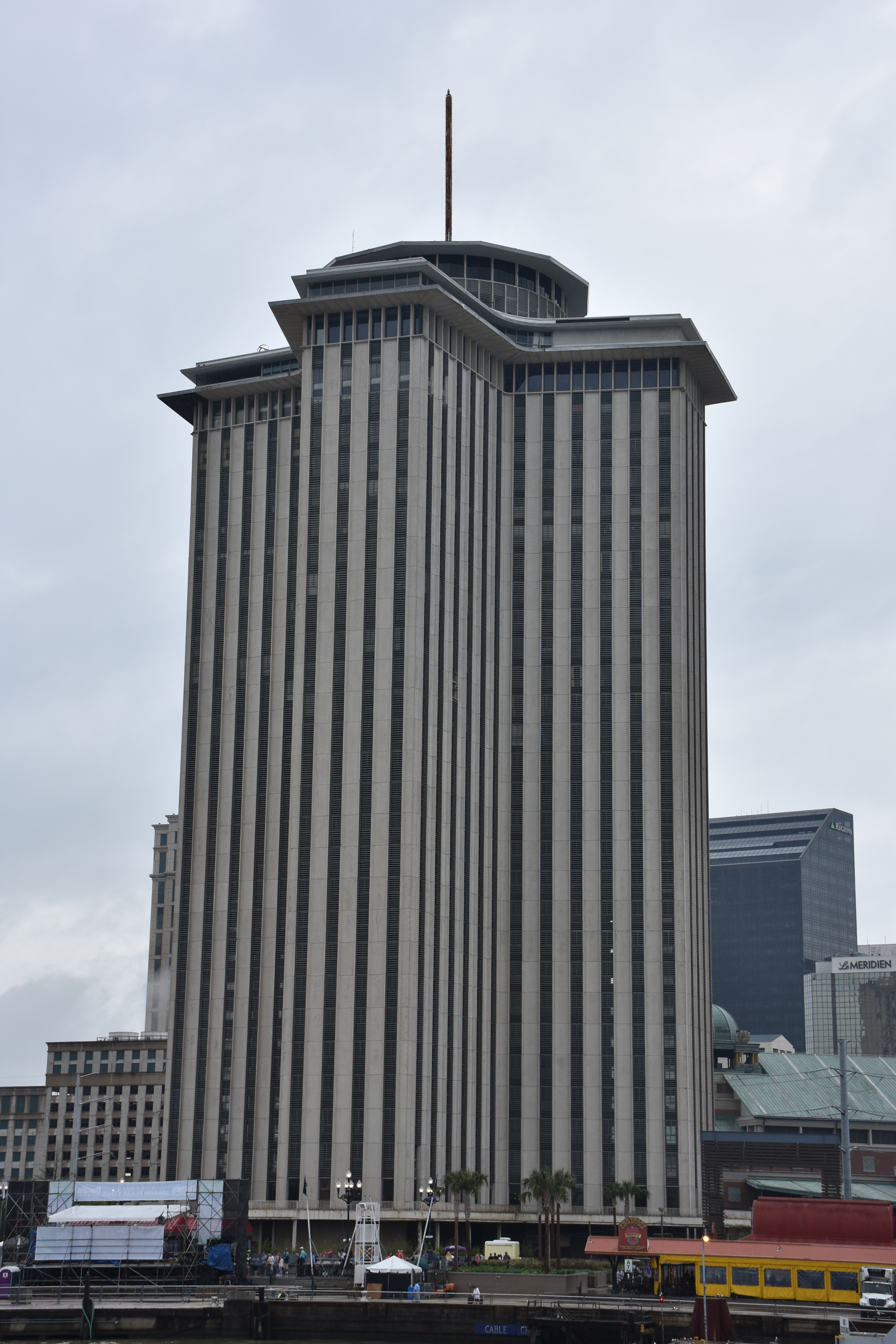
WWOM-TV, later WGNO-TV, occupied the 29th and other floors of the International Trade Mart/World Trade Center building in New Orleans from 1967 to 2005 and 2006 to 2007.

As FCC approval of the SF Broadcasting purchase was delayed by more than a year because of a commission inquiry as to whether Fox was a foreign-owned company as a result of Rupert Murdoch's interest, ABC opted to strike first. On August 10, 1995, WGNO was finally announced as the new ABC affiliate in New Orleans beginning in 1996. That set up an affiliation switch on January 1, 1996. WGNO became the new ABC affiliate, while WB shows moved to WNOL-TV and Fox moved to WVUE. The switch, however, caused overall ratings to fall at channel 26.

WGNO and Atlanta's new CBS affiliate, WGNX, were the only two Big Three affiliates the company owned at the time and outliers in Tribune's portfolio of Fox and WB affiliates; in 1998, Tribune began actively seeking trades for the two outlets in exchange for WB and Fox stations elsewhere. While such a trade was arranged for WGNX, Tribune took WGNO off the market after the legalization of duopolies in November 1999; this allowed it to acquire WNOL-TV outright and create the first such pairing in New Orleans. The stations were combined under WGNO's general manager; WNOL began to air prime time news breaks promoting channel 26's late newscasts. Despite being commonly owned, WNOL and WGNO did not operate from the same facility until July 2005, when channel 26 moved from the 28th and 29th floors of the World Trade Center (the former International Trade Mart) to the New Orleans Centre, where WNOL had been operating since 2000. The relocation and installation of new transmitters at Chalmette were an investment of nearly $10 million.

==== Hurricane Katrina ====
Hurricane Katrina devastated the New Orleans area in August 2005 and led to years of operational challenges for WGNO and WNOL. Even though the New Orleans Centre was only flooded on the first floor, its owner canceled all leases, and it never reopened. Both stations' transmitters were a loss, submerged by six feet (1.8 m) of flooding and with a small alligator found stuck in a fence; a digital transmitter from Tribune-owned WTIC-TV in Hartford, Connecticut, was converted to analog use and shipped to New Orleans, and WGNO was temporarily broadcast in digital form by WPXL-TV. Tribune had already restored a signal for satellite viewers by moving master control for the stations to Indianapolis and Chicago. WGNO–WNOL set up facilities in two double-wide trailers, dubbed "The Compound", and moved its business operations to Covington. The stations moved back to the World Trade Center in April 2006.

The Trade Center was only a temporary solution. In August 2007, Tribune officially moved to The Galleria in Metairie. Work also began on restoring digital broadcast facilities. WGNO had been assigned channel 15 for digital use and WNOL channel 40, but after Katrina, Tribune opted to rebuild WNOL on channel 15—broadcasting both stations—and convert WGNO to digital on channel 26 at the analog transition, sharing a site with WDSU.

=== Sale to Nexstar ===
After Sinclair Broadcast Group's attempt to purchase Tribune failed in 2018, Tribune was acquired by Nexstar Media Group of Irving, Texas, in 2019 for $6.4 billion in cash and debt.

During Hurricane Ida on August 29, 2021, The Galleria studio's ceiling was ripped by high winds at the control room forcing all staff, producers, and anchors to evacuate the studio, just minutes prior to a power outage being reported inside the studio.

Nexstar acquired Tegna—owner of WWL-TV (channel 4) and WUPL (channel 54)—in a deal announced in August 2025 and completed on March 19, 2026. As part of regulatory approval for the transaction, Nexstar committed to the divestiture of WUPL within two years, along with five other stations, mostly in markets where the two companies combined held four TV station licenses. A temporary restraining order issued one week later by the U.S. District Court for the Eastern District of California, later escalated to a preliminary injunction, has prevented WWL and WUPL from being integrated into WNOL and WGNO.

== News operation ==
=== Establishment ===
In becoming an ABC affiliate, WGNO committed to building the first new TV newsroom in New Orleans since WWL-TV signed on in 1957 and increase its overall staff from 65 to 110. The station was also able to draw on the existing resources of its local production unit. Ed Daniels, the host of N.O. It Alls and several sports programs, became the sports anchor for the station's newscasts. (Ronnie Virgets, the host of Real New Orleans, left for WWL-TV.)

ABC 26 News launched with a 10 p.m. newscast on March 18, 1996. The program was anchored by Andre Trevigne, pulling double duty with a radio show on WWL radio; Brad Giffen, formerly of Toronto; meteorologist Bruce Katz; and Daniels. It featured a high story count and fast pace and was aimed toward a younger audience than the existing newscasts in New Orleans. While another newscast was not immediately planned, news ratings struggled, in part because the shift from an independent to an ABC affiliate was also a shift from a more urban to a more suburban audience. With general manager Bill Ross believing that a second newscast was necessary for people to take the station seriously as a news source, a 5 p.m. edition debuted in September 1996; Trevigne moved to that newscast only, citing her radio duties, and eventually left in April 1997. WGNO slowly carved out more of an audience for its evening newscasts than initially anticipated, adding a 6 p.m. half-hour in 1998 on the strength of beating WDSU and WVUE; though it was in third or fourth in most timeslots still, it was second at 5 p.m., and its audience was younger than that of the news offerings on channels 4, 6, or 8. However, the Project for Excellence in Journalism gave the station's news output one of the lowest grades in the country and criticized it for covering too many car accidents.

While ratings had steadily increased in the late 1990s, they slipped badly in May 2002; the station posted year-over-year viewership declines of 20 percent or more for each of its three daily newscasts. Daniels moved from anchoring sports to news later that year, an experiment that accompanied an overhaul of the station's newscasts with new visual elements and weekly contributions from Virgets. The experiment ended when veteran New Orleans anchor Susan Roesgen became the 10 p.m. anchor in November 2003. Founding news director Paula Pendarvis departed in February 2004.

=== Hurricane Katrina ===
Hurricane Katrina arrived only a month after WGNO and its news department moved into the New Orleans Centre. As part of the evacuation plan, newscasts were aired from the studios of Baton Rouge ABC affiliate WBRZ-TV for six weeks; the two stations produced combined coverage seen by evacuees in Baton Rouge and elsewhere, with meteorologist Katz the first to leave New Orleans to cover the storm. Dave Walker of The Times-Picayune, in a retrospective a year after Katrina, called Katz's commentary on the first helicopter footage of a flooded New Orleans "one of Katrina's most indelible moments". After that, newscasts began originating from an outdoor set on a nightly basis, using an anchor desk salvaged from the New Orleans Centre studios and a variety of cobbled-together equipment in "The Compound" of double-wide trailers.

WGNO returned to the Trade Center on a temporary basis in April 2006 (remaining there until moving to The Galleria in August 2007), though much of the equipment that had been left at the Trade Center had been damaged from being shut off and stored in hot, humid spaces. During this time, WGNO began producing a half-hour prime time newscast at 9 p.m. for WNOL-TV on May 1, 2006; news had been planned for a number of years under Tribune management. The program lasted four years and was canceled on June 4, 2010, owing to low ratings and a desire to promote channel 38's sitcoms.

After twelve and a half years, as part of a push by Tribune, WGNO debuted a morning newscast on September 29, 2008: Good Morning New Orleans, a two-hour conversational news and lifestyle program. However, the station's ratings were still stuck in last place: new anchors were introduced to the morning and evening newscasts in 2009.

=== News with a Twist ===
On January 31, 2011, WGNO reformatted the 6 p.m. newscast as News with a Twist, a newsmagazine format that focused on lighter stories and commentary and was mostly unscripted. The set for the program doubled as a functional bar; guest anchors included New Orleans archbishop Gregory Michael Aymond, the chief of the New Orleans Police Department, and a lawyer who also was a station advertiser. On December 12, 2011, the News with a Twist format was extended to the 5 p.m. newscast, concurrent with the cancellation of the 6:30 p.m. newscast; the station's Saturday evening newscasts were replaced on December 17 with a weekend edition of News with a Twist that reviewed feature stories seen during that week's 5 and 6 p.m. broadcasts. The weekday morning, 11 a.m., 10 p.m., and Sunday evening newscasts retained a more traditional news format. Meteorologist Katz left in 2012 for WVUE.

The News with a Twist format was abandoned in 2020 and consigned to occasional specials due to the onset of the COVID-19 pandemic. Daniels died in August 2024, having been the only sports director in the station's history.

==== Notable former on-air staff ====
- Mike Church – commentator for News with a Twist
- Kinsey Schofield – anchor/reporter (2018–2019)

== Technical information ==
=== Subchannels ===
WGNO's transmitter is located in Chalmette. The station's signal is multiplexed:

Subchannels of WGNO
Subchannel	Res.	Short name	Programming
26.1	720p	WGNO-DT	ABC
26.2	480i	AntTV	Antenna TV (4:3)
26.3	480i	Rewind	Rewind TV (4:3)
26.4	480i	ROAR	Roar (4:3)
54.2	480i	Quest	Quest (WUPL)
54.3	480i	H & I	Heroes & Icons (WUPL)

Broadcast on behalf of another station

The 54.2 and 54.3 subchannels of WUPL are broadcast on WGNO as part of the market's ATSC 3.0 (NextGen TV) deployment plan. WUPL began broadcasting in ATSC 3.0 on December 15, 2022.
