= New Orleans Centre =

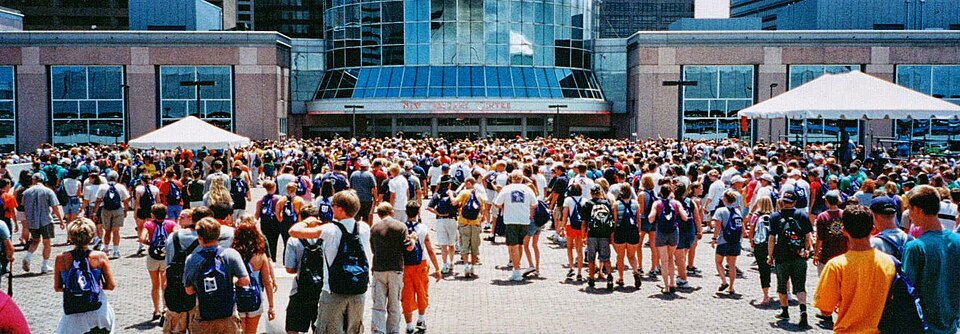
- New Orleans Centre on June 30, 2001 during the National Lutheran Youth Gathering
- Location: New Orleans, Louisiana
- Coordinates: 29°57′00″N 90°04′42″W
- Opened: August 1, 1988; 38 years ago
- Closed: 2005; 21 years ago
- Developer: Edward J. DeBartolo Corp.
- Num. of anchor tenants: 0 (originally 2)
- Floor area: 600,000 square feet (56,000 m^{2})
- Floors: 3

New Orleans Centre was a shopping mall in New Orleans, Louisiana, United States.

The mall opened in 1988 with Lord & Taylor and Macy's as the two anchors. It had space for 150 stores, opened with 50, and had about 100 at its peak. It had three stories and a huge glass skylight over its main concourse. It had a large food court, with several restaurants facing the Louisiana Superdome (later known as the Mercedes-Benz Superdome, now known as Caesars Superdome). It never had full occupancy and struggled financially shortly after it opened. Tribune Broadcasting took advantage of the nearly-empty third floor of the structure and leased it out in 2005 to provide studios for the city's ABC affiliate, WGNO (Channel 26). Lord & Taylor closed in the early 2000s, shutting off the Poydras Street mall entrance.

In 2005, the mall was flooded during Hurricane Katrina and did not reopen, with WGNO moving to Metairie's Galleria building. It was used in the movie The Final Destination for the scene where the women were shopping and the escalators fell apart. One part of that scene shows the nearby Benson Tower from the angle that was seen through the skylights.

The mall-and-tower complex was purchased by New Orleans Saints owner Tom Benson in 2009, when it was quoted at 400,000 sq ft. It was partially torn down, and that area is now called Champions Square and has several Saints and Louisiana sports-related murals. It is mostly used for sports events, and the former Macy's has partially been turned into a VIP area.
