= Palmer Plaza =

Skyscraper in Nashville, Tennessee

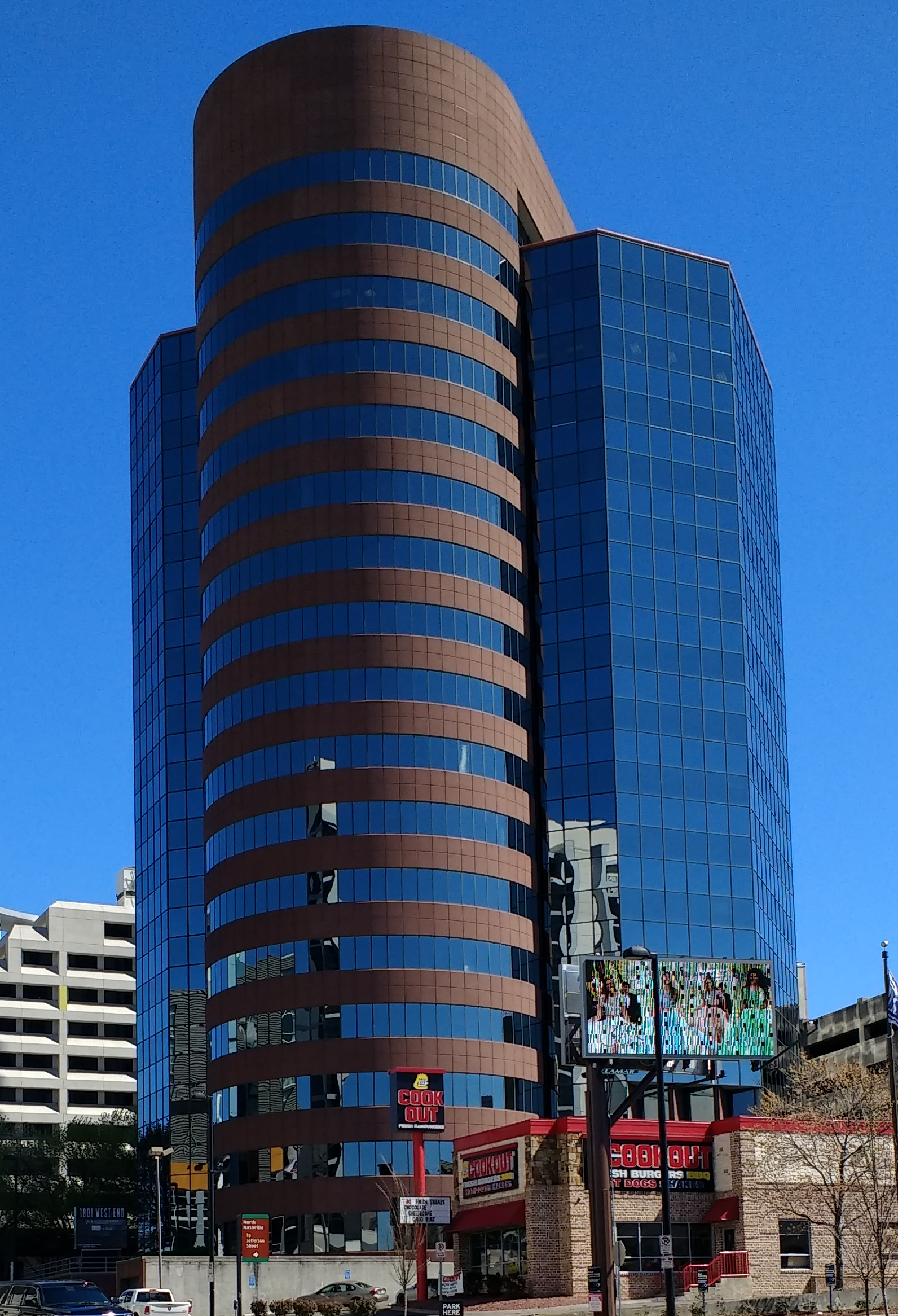
- Interactive map of the Palmer Plaza area

General information
- Type: Office
- Location: 1801 West End Avenue; Nashville, Tennessee; United States
- Coordinates: 36.1524°N 86.7962°W
- Completed: 1986

Height
- Roof: 269 ft (82 m)

Technical details
- Floor count: 18
- Floor area: 283,995 sq ft (26,384.0 m^{2})
- Lifts/elevators: 9

Design and construction
- Architect: Gould Turner Group PC
- Developer: Alex S. Palmer & Company
- Structural engineer: Stanley D. Lindsey and Associates, Ltd.

Palmer Plaza is a 269-foot 18-story office skyscraper in Nashville, Tennessee. It is named after the company who built it and is headquartered there, Alex S. Palmer & Company. The building features a fitness center on its rooftop.

The ninth floor of the building is home to the Consulate-General of Japan, Nashville.

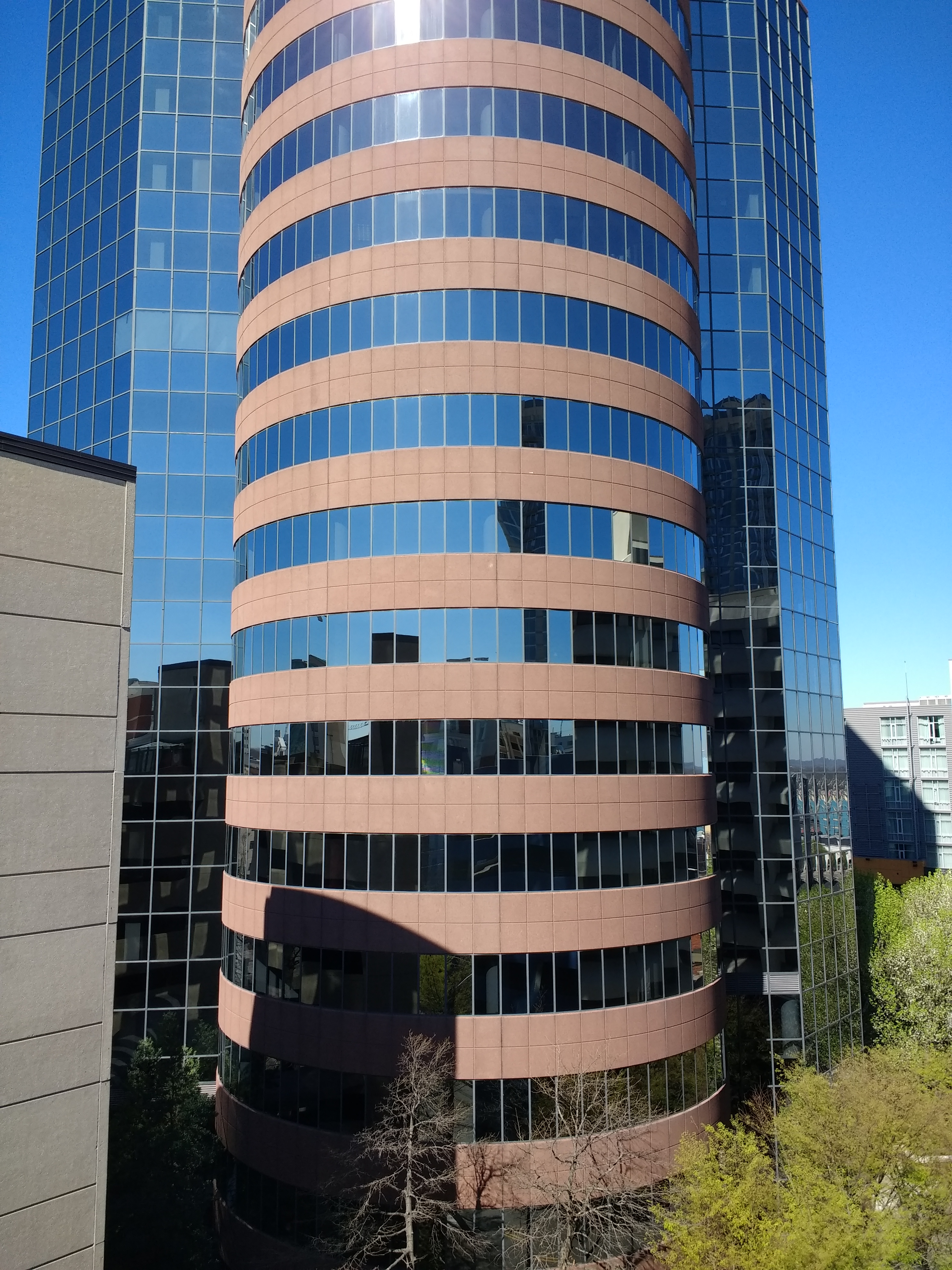
Palmer Plaza, location of the Consulate-General of Japan, Nashville

== See also ==
- List of tallest buildings in Nashville
