= Entergy Tower =

Skyscraper in New Orleans, Louisiana

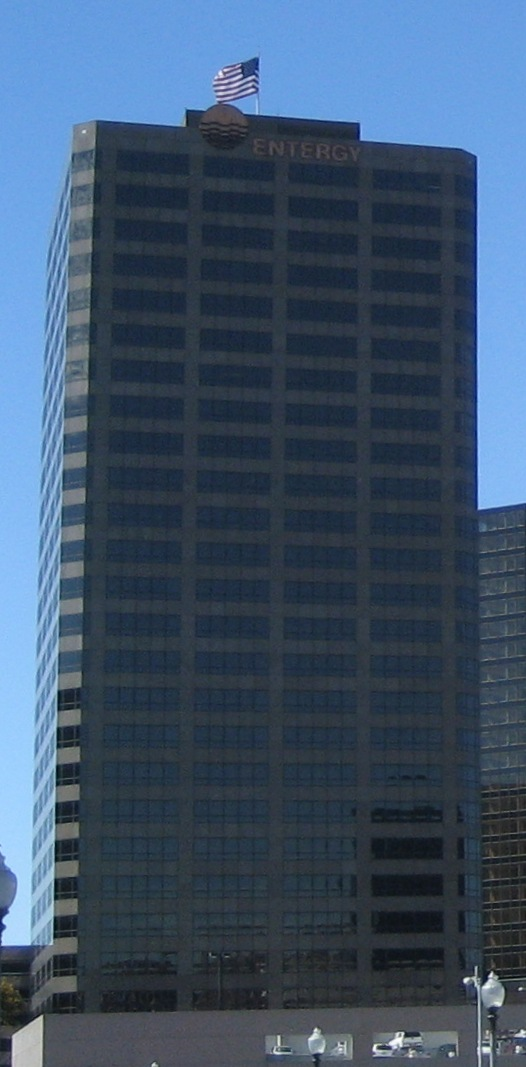
- Interactive map of the Entergy Tower area

General information
- Type: Office
- Location: 639 Loyola Avenue; New Orleans, LA; United States
- Coordinates: 29.948888°N 90.07654°W
- Completed: 1983

Height
- Antenna spire: N/A
- Roof: 360 feet (110 m)

Technical details
- Floor count: 28
- Floor area: 452,988 sq ft (42,084.0 m^{2})

Design and construction
- Architect: The Beck Group Architects

Entergy Tower (also known as One Poydras Plaza), located at 639 Loyola Avenue in the Central Business District of New Orleans, Louisiana, is a 28-story, 360-foot-tall (110 m) skyscraper.

The building used to have the Consulate-General of Japan in New Orleans. In 2006, the Japanese Government announced that it was moving the consulate to Nashville, Tennessee. The diplomatic mission was relocated to be closer to industries and operations owned by Japanese companies.

== See also ==
- List of tallest buildings in New Orleans
