= The Galleria (Louisiana) =

Office building in Louisiana, US

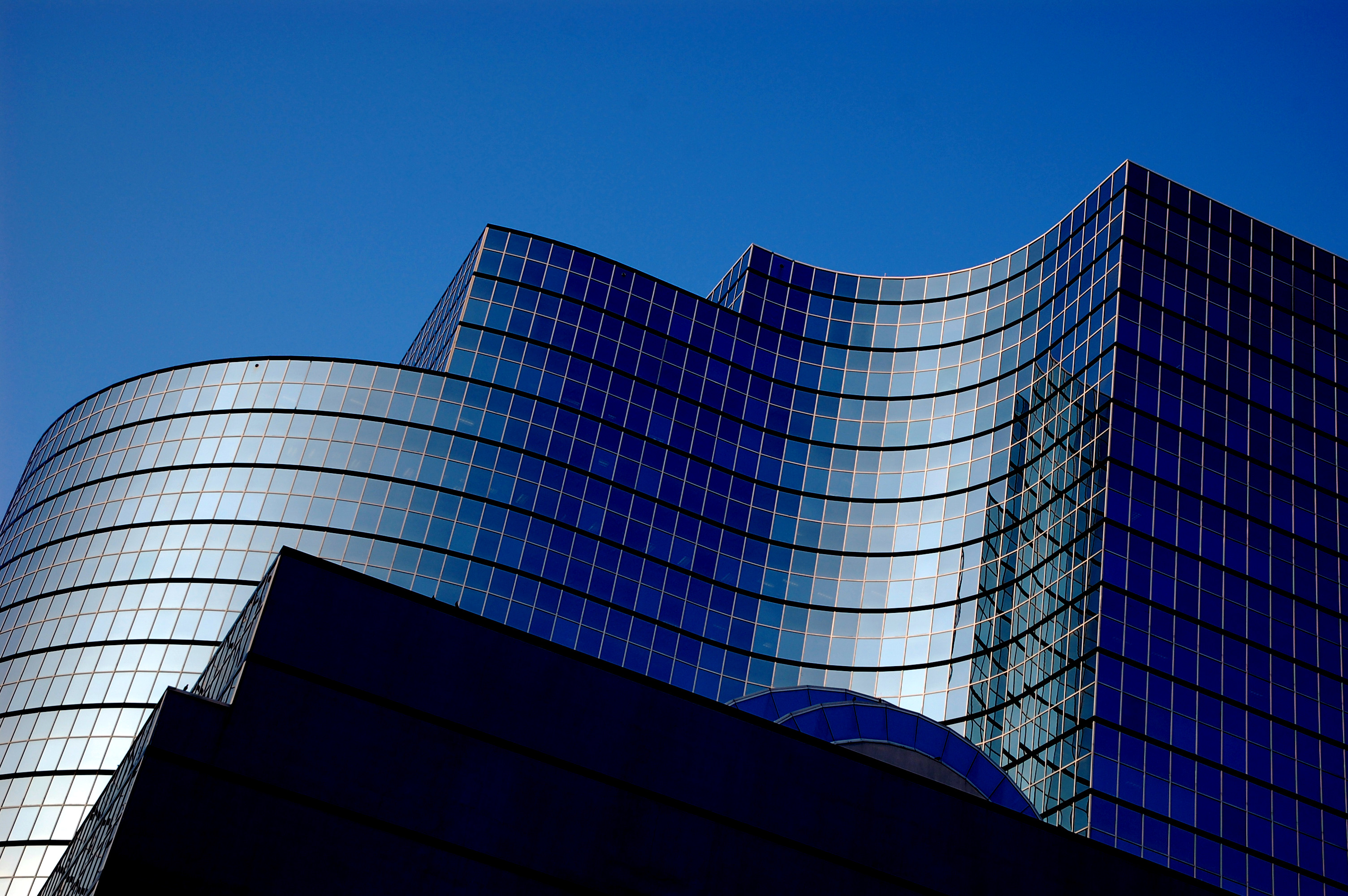
- Interactive map of the The Galleria area

General information
- Type: Office
- Location: One Galleria Boulevard; Metairie, LA; U.S.
- Coordinates: 29.99555°N 90.15207°W
- Completed: 1986

Height
- Roof: 269 feet (82 m)

Technical details
- Floor count: 21

Design and construction
- Architects: HKS, Inc.
- Developer: Daniel Robinowitz

The Galleria is a 21-story, 269-foot (82 m)-tall skyscraper in Metairie, Louisiana, United States, designed by architect HKS, Inc. The Galleria was completed in 1986 and is the second tallest building in Jefferson Parish. The tower's primary use is as office space, along with the studios of Nexstar Media Group's two television stations for the New Orleans market, ABC affiliate WGNO and CW station WNOL-TV.

== Location ==
The building is located at One Galleria Boulevard near the Sheraton Metairie – New Orleans Hotel.

== History ==
In 1983, Daniel Robinowitz, a developer from Texas, announced his plan to build a new office complex called "Galleria" near Interstate 10 and Causeway Boulevard in Metairie. Harwood K. Smith and Partners (known as HKS, Inc.) was hired to design the buildings. Six towers of roughly equal height were originally planned, with a total estimated cost of $500 million; this tower (The Galleria) is the only one that was built. The project was planned to be built in four phases. Phase one is called "Galleria One", which included The Galleria tower. At that time, it was built at a cost of $100 million. It was opened in December 1986.

In 2005, the building was acquired by The Feil Organization, a New York City based real estate company.

In early 2020, Bernhard LLC, an energy service, engineering, and mechanical and electrical contractor (later rebranded as ENFRA in 2025), established its national headquarters in The Galleria.

The tower underwent a $5 million renovation in 2025. The project was managed by AGL Commercial Interiors and Landis Construction, with Pinnacle Elevator and TKE responsible for the building elevators. Works included were modernization of the lobby, parking garage, service, tower, and penthouse elevators. It was completed in May that year.

== See also ==
- List of tallest buildings in New Orleans
- List of tallest buildings in Metairie
