= Tribune Broadcasting =

American television and radio broadcast company (1924–2019)

Tribune Broadcasting Company, LLC
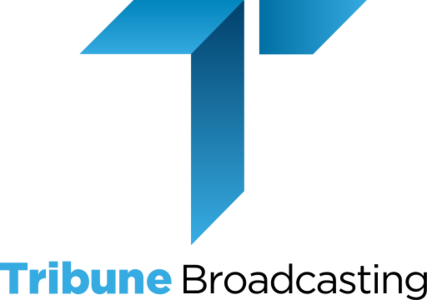
- Final logo used from 2014 to 2019
- Formerly: WGN Incorporated; (1924–1966); WGN Continental Broadcasting Company; (1966–1981)
- Type: Subsidiary
- Industry: Broadcast television; radio
- Founded: 1924; 102 years ago
- Defunct: September 19, 2019; 7 years ago
- Fate: Acquired by Nexstar
- Successor: Nexstar Media Group
- Headquarters: 515 North State Street, Chicago, Illinois, United States
- Area served: United States
- Key people: Peter Liguori; (president/CEO, Tribune Media); Larry Wert; (President, Tribune Broadcasting)
- Parent: Tribune Media
- Divisions: Tribune Studios
- Website: www.tribunemedia.com

Tribune Broadcasting Company, LLC was an American media company which operated as a subsidiary of Tribune Media, a media conglomerate based in Chicago, Illinois. The group owned and operated television and radio stations throughout the United States, as well as full- or partial-ownership of cable television and national digital subchannel networks.

== History ==
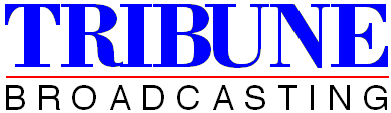
Tribune Broadcasting logo used from 1992 to 2011.

Tribune's broadcasting unit originated with the June 1924 purchase of Chicago, Illinois, radio station WDAP by the Chicago Tribune. The new owners changed the station's call letters to WGN, to match the Tribune's slogan, "World's Greatest Newspaper" first used by Tribune in a February 1909 feature commemorating the 100th anniversary of the birth of Abraham Lincoln and then served as the newspaper's motto from August 29, 1911, until December 31, 1976.

On September 13, 1946, the Federal Communications Commission (FCC) granted Tribune license to operate a television station on channel 9 in Chicago and then signed-on a television station in Chicago, WGN-TV on April 5, 1948, initially as a dual affiliate of CBS and the DuMont Television Network. Two months later, the Tribune's then-sibling newspaper in New York City, the Daily News, established its own television station, independent WPIX. WGN-TV became an independent outlet by 1956, and eventually morphed into a pioneering national superstation on November 9, 1978, as its signal was linked to cable and satellite customers across the United States.

After McCormick succumbed from pneumonia-related complications on April 1, 1955, ownership of WGN-TV-AM, the Chicago Tribune and the News Syndicate Company properties would transfer to the McCormick-Patterson Trust, assigned to the Robert R. McCormick Tribune Foundation in the names of the non-familial heirs of McCormick (whose two marriages never produced any children) and familial heirs of Patterson. The trust was dissolved in January 1975, with a majority of the trust's former beneficiaries, including descendants of the McCormick and Patterson families, owning stock in the restructured Tribune Company entity – which assumed oversight of all properties previously overseen by the trust – afterward.

In subsequent years, the Tribune Company gradually expanded its broadcasting unit, of which WGN-TV-AM served as its flagship stations, a tie forged in January 1966, when the subsidiary (sans the WPIX television and radio stations, which continued to be controlled by the Tribune-managed News Syndicate Co. before being fully integrated into the company's main station group following its 1991 sale of the Daily News) was renamed the WGN Continental Broadcasting Company.

The group became known as the Tribune Broadcasting Company in January 1981, but retained the WGN Continental moniker as its de facto business name until 1984 and as the licensee for WGN-TV and WGN Radio thereafter. The company gained its third television and second radio station in 1960, when it purchased KDAL-TV (now KDLH) and KDAL (AM) in Duluth, Minnesota, from the estate of the late Dalton LeMasurier (Tribune sold KDAL-TV in 1978 and KDAL radio in 1981); the company would later purchase KCTO (subsequently re-called KWGN-TV) in Denver from J. Elroy McCaw in 1966.

Tribune's later television purchases included those of WANX-TV (later renamed WGNX) in Atlanta and WGNO in New Orleans (both in 1983); KTLA in Los Angeles (in 1985), WPHL-TV in Philadelphia (in 1992). WLVI-TV in Boston (owned from 1994 to 2006); KHTV (now KIAH) in Houston (in 1995); KTTY (now KSWB-TV) in San Diego (in 1996); WXMI in Grand Rapids, Michigan, KCPQ and KTWB-TV (now KZJO) in Seattle (in 1998 and 1999, respectively); and WBDC-TV (now WDCW) in Washington, D.C. (in 1999). WGN-TV and WPIX were the only stations that Tribune had owned since their inceptions. Tribune also operated several local cable television systems from 1977 to 1985.

In 1993, Tribune launched Chicagoland Television (CLTV), a regional cable news channel for the Chicago area, which originally operated separately from the company's other Chicago media properties until it merged its operations with WGN-TV's news department in 2009. In November 1994, Tribune Broadcasting formed a partnership with several minority partners, including Quincy Jones, to form Qwest Broadcasting; Qwest operated as a technically separate company from Tribune (which owned stations in a few markets where Tribune-owned stations, including WATL in Atlanta, which was operated alongside Tribune-owned WGNX and WNOL-TV in New Orleans, which was also operated alongside WGNO); Tribune would later acquire the Qwest stations outright in November 1999.

In January 1995, Tribune Broadcasting became a partner in The WB Television Network, in a joint venture with the Warner Bros. Television division of Time Warner. Tribune initially had a 12.5% ownership interest in the network at its launch and later increased its stake to 22%. In addition, partly as a result of a November 1993 affiliation deal with the network, most of Tribune's television properties were WB affiliates. On July 2, 1996, Tribune acquired Renaissance Broadcasting, which owned Fox- and WB-affiliated stations in several large and mid-sized markets for $1.13 billion.

On April 19, 2002, Tribune announced that it would acquire WTTV (then a WB affiliate, later became a CBS affiliate in 2015) and its satellite station WTTK in Indianapolis from the Sinclair Broadcast Group for $125 million, creating a duopoly with WXIN.

On December 30, 2002, Tribune announced that it would acquire WB affiliates KPLR-TV in St. Louis, Missouri and KWBP (now known as KRCW-TV) in Portland, Oregon from ACME Communications for $275 million, the acquisition was completed on March 21, 2003.

On January 24, 2006, Time Warner announced that it would partner with CBS Corporation to form a new network that would feature The WB and CBS-owned UPN's higher-rated shows mixed with newer series, called The CW Television Network. All but three of Tribune's 19 WB affiliates became affiliates of The CW on September 18, 2006, through ten-year agreements (the exceptions were in Philadelphia, Seattle and Atlanta, due to The CW affiliating with CBS-owned stations in those markets), though Tribune itself would not exercise an ownership stake in The CW as it did with The WB.

In April 2007, Tribune's broadcasting interests were included in the sale of the entire company to Chicago investor Sam Zell, who planned take the publicly traded company private. The deal was completed on December 20, 2007.

On December 21, 2007, Tribune and Oak Hill Capital Partners-controlled Local TV, LLC announced plans to collaborate in the formation of a "broadcast management company" (later named The Other Company); its Tribune Interactive division also operated the websites of its stations as part of the partnership.

On December 8, 2008, Tribune announced that it would voluntarily restructure its debt obligations, as part of its filing for Chapter 11 bankruptcy protection in the United States Bankruptcy Court. As the company had sufficient funds to do so, Tribune continued to operate its newspaper publishing and broadcasting, and interactive businesses without interruption during the restructuring.

On January 1, 2011, Tribune launched the digital broadcast network Antenna TV, a service that features a variety of classic television series, including programming from Sony Pictures Television and D.L. Taffner Entertainment. On May 13, 2013, Tribune announced that it would buy a 50% stake in the This TV digital broadcast network from fellow Chicago-based media company Weigel Broadcasting; Tribune took over operational duties for the network on November 1, 2013.

=== Split and subsequent transactions ===
On July 1, 2013, Tribune announced that it would purchase the 19 stations owned by Local TV, LLC outright for $2.725 billion; the purchase expanded the number of Big Three network affiliates in its portfolio from one to 10 (most of Tribune's television stations prior to the purchase had either been independent stations or from 1995 onward, affiliates of networks that have launched since 1986; New Orleans station WGNO (channel 26) – an ABC affiliate – was Tribune's only station affiliated with one of the three pre-1986 networks prior to the purchase), as well as form duopolies involving stations in Denver and St. Louis where the two companies maintained local marketing agreements.

In order to prevent conflicts with newspaper cross-ownership restrictions (specifically, with Daily Press and The Morning Call), three stations involved in the acquisition – the Norfolk, Virginia, duopoly of WTKR (channel 3) and WGNT (channel 27), and Scranton, Pennsylvania, station WNEP-TV (channel 16) – were sold to Dreamcatcher Broadcasting and are operated by Tribune under shared services agreements (Tribune has an option to purchase WNEP after the publishing/broadcasting split, although such a transfer may be complicated by possible FCC action on a proposal to end a "discount" in television station ownership limits that count UHF stations to half a percentage to a group's overall market reach, which would put Tribune just over the current limit of 39%, under which the company's current station holdings after the Local TV purchase would be grandfathered). The Federal Communications Commission approved the acquisition on December 20, and the sale was completed one week later on December 27.

=== Aborted merger with Sinclair; acquisition by Nexstar ===
On February 29, 2016, Tribune Media announced that it would review various "strategic alternatives" to increase the company's value to shareholders, which include a possible sale of the entire company and/or select assets, or the formation of programming alliances or strategic partnerships with other companies, due to the decrease in its stock price since the Tribune Publishing spin-off and a $385 million revenue write-down for the 2015 fiscal year, partly due to original scripted programming expenditures for WGN America since it converted the cable network from a superstation in 2014.

With the FCC reinstating the "UHF discount" rule, reports surfaced in late April 2017 that multiple parties were attempting to make offers for Tribune, including Sinclair Broadcast Group, Nexstar Media Group, and a partnership between 21st Century Fox and Blackstone Group. On May 7, 2017, it was reported that Sinclair Broadcast Group was nearing a deal to purchase Tribune Media, and that 21st Century Fox had dropped its bid for the company. On May 8, 2017, Sinclair Broadcast Group officially announced its intent to acquire Tribune Media. The transaction would have been a cash-and-stock deal valuing the company at $3.9 billion. Depending on regulatory changes or decisions, some divestitures might have been required. However, on August 9, 2018, Tribune canceled the Sinclair deal.

On November 14, 2018, it was reported that Nexstar was a leading bidder to acquire Tribune. On December 3, 2018, Nexstar announced its intent to merge with Tribune Media for $6.4 billion ($4.1 billion for all of Tribune's shares in cash and $2.3 billion of Tribune's debt). The merge would give the company 216 stations in 118 markets, placing it just below the FCC's market cap of 39% of TV households and making it the largest owner of television stations in the United States. On August 1, 2019, the United States Department of Justice approved the deal between Nexstar Media Group and Tribune Media. The sale was approved by the FCC on September 16, and occurred on September 19.

== Television production and distribution ==
=== Tribune Entertainment ===
Tribune Entertainment was Tribune's television production, syndication and advertising sales subsidiary. Founded in 1981, this subsidiary produced and/or distributed several first-run syndicated programs including most notably Geraldo, Soul Train, and the U.S. Farm Report; Tribune Entertainment's production and syndication divisions were shut down in December 2007.

=== Tribune Studios ===
On March 19, 2013, Tribune Company announced its return to television production with the formation of Tribune Studios (not to be confused with the Los Angeles studio facility that formerly held the same name until its sale by Tribune to private equity firm Hudson Capital in 2008, and was subsequently renamed Sunset Bronson Studios). The new company will produce programs primarily for Tribune Broadcasting's television stations and WGN America, some of which will receive national distribution. On September 17, 2019, Tribune Studios, the television parent of Tribune Broadcasting, was acquired by Nexstar, and the television company went disbanded shortly.

== Final stations ==
- Stations are arranged in alphabetical order by state and city of license.
- Two boldface asterisks appearing following a station's call letters (**) indicate a station built and signed on by Tribune.

Stations owned by Tribune Broadcasting
| Media market | State/District | Station | Purchased | Sold | Notes |
|---|---|---|---|---|---|
| Huntsville | Alabama | WHNT-TV | 2013 | 2019 | |
| Fort Smith | Arkansas | KFSM-TV | 2013 | 2019 | |
| Fort Smith | Arkansas | KXNW | 2013 | 2019 | |
| Los Angeles | California | KTLA | 1985 | 2019 | |
| Sacramento–Stockton–Modesto | California | KCTC | 1975 | 1996 | |
| Sacramento–Stockton–Modesto | California | KGNR | 1975 | 1996 | |
| Sacramento–Stockton–Modesto | California | KTXL | 1997 | 2019 | |
| San Diego | California | KSWB-TV | 1996 | 2019 | |
| Denver | Colorado | KDVR | 2013 | 2019 | |
| Denver | Colorado | KEZW | 1993 | 2002 | |
| Denver | Colorado | KKHK | 1995 | 2002 | |
| Denver | Colorado | KOSI | 1993 | 2002 | |
| Denver | Colorado | KWGN-TV | 1966 | 2019 | (Note: Operated by Local TV LLC from 2008 to 2013.) |
| Fort Collins | Colorado | KFCT | 2013 | 2019 | (Note: Satellite of KDVR.) |
| Bridgeport | Connecticut | WICC | 1967 | 1989 | |
| Hartford–New Haven | Connecticut | WTIC-TV | 1997 | 2019 | |
| Waterbury | Connecticut | WCCT-TV | 2001 | 2019 | |
| Washington | District of Columbia | WDCW | 1999 | 2019 | |
| Miami–Fort Lauderdale | Florida | WSFL-TV | 1997 | 2019 | |
| Atlanta | Georgia | WGNX | 1983 | 1999 | |
| Atlanta | Georgia | WATL | 2000 | 2006 | |
| Chicago | Illinois | WFMT | 1968 | 1970 | |
| Chicago | Illinois | WGN | 1924 | 2019 | |
| Chicago | Illinois | WGN-TV ** | 1948 | 2019 | |
| Chicago | Illinois | WGWG-LP | 2014 | 2015 | (Note: Owned by Venture Technologies Group and operated by Tribune.) |
| Moline | Illinois | WQAD-TV | 2013 | 2019 | |
| Bloomington | Indiana | WTTV | 2002 | 2019 | |
| Indianapolis | Indiana | WXIN | 1997 | 2019 | |
| Kokomo | Indiana | WTTK | 2002 | 2019 | (Note: Satellite of WTTV.) |
| Des Moines | Iowa | WHO-DT | 2013 | 2019 | |
| New Orleans | Louisiana | WGNO | 1983 | 2019 | |
| New Orleans | Louisiana | WNOL-TV | 2000 | 2019 | |
| Boston | Massachusetts | WLVI-TV | 1994 | 2006 | |
| Grand Rapids–Battle Creek–Kalamazoo | Michigan | WXMI | 1998 | 2019 | |
| Duluth | Minnesota | KDAL | 1960 | 1981 | |
| Duluth | Minnesota | KDAL-TV | 1960 | 1979 | |
| Kansas City | Missouri | WDAF-TV | 2013 | 2019 | |
| St. Louis | Missouri | KPLR-TV | 2003 | 2019 | |
| St. Louis | Missouri | KTVI | 2013 | 2019 | |
| New York | New York | WPIX-FM | 1963 | 1997 | |
| New York | New York | WPIX ** | 1948 | 2019 | |
| Schenectady–Albany | New York | WCWN | 1999 | 2006 | |
| High Point–Greensboro–Winston-Salem | North Carolina | WGHP | 2013 | 2019 | |
| Cleveland | Ohio | WJW | 2013 | 2019 | |
| Oklahoma City | Oklahoma | KAUT-TV | 2013 | 2019 | |
| Oklahoma City | Oklahoma | KFOR-TV | 2013 | 2019 | |
| Portland | Oregon | KRCW-TV | 2003 | 2019 | |
| Philadelphia | Pennsylvania | WPHL-TV | 1992 | 2019 | |
| Scranton–Wilkes-Barre | Pennsylvania | WNEP-TV | 2013 | 2019 | |
| York–Harrisburg–Lancaster–Lebanon | Pennsylvania | WPMT | 1997 | 2019 | |
| Memphis | Tennessee | WREG-TV | 2013 | 2019 | |
| Dallas–Fort Worth | Texas | KDAF | 1997 | 2019 | |
| Houston | Texas | KIAH | 1996 | 2019 | |
| Salt Lake City | Utah | KSTU | 2013 | 2019 | |
| Norfolk | Virginia | WGNT | 2013 | 2019 | |
| Norfolk | Virginia | WTKR | 2013 | 2019 | |
| Richmond | Virginia | WTVR-TV | 2013 | 2019 | |
| Tacoma–Seattle | Washington | KCPQ | 1999 | 2019 | |
| Tacoma–Seattle | Washington | KZJO | 1998 | 2019 | |
| Milwaukee | Wisconsin | WITI | 2013 | 2019 | |

== Other assets ==
=== Cable networks ===
- WGN America
- Chicagoland Television
- Food Network (30 percent interest)

=== Digital multicast networks ===
- This TV (50 percent interest)
- Antenna TV
