= Zewe =

Zewe is a surname. Notable people with the surname include:

- Charles Zewe, American reporter
- Gerd Zewe (born 1950), German footballer and manager
- Joe Zewe (born 1983), American soccer player
