= Imagination Movers (TV series) =

American comedy TV series

- Genre: Sitcom; Musical
- Developed by: Rick Gitelson
- Starring: Rich Collins; Dave Poche; Scott Durbin; Scott "Smitty" Smith; Wendy Calio; Douglas Fisher
- Voices of: Kath Soucie; Kevin Carlson
- Opening theme: "Imagination Movers Theme Song"
- Ending theme: "Mover Music (Jump Up!)"
- Composer: Stuart Kollmorgen
- Country of origin: United States
- Original language: English
- No. of seasons: 3
- No. of episodes: 75 (list of episodes)

Production
- Executive producers: Skot Bright; Sascha Penn; Rick Gitelson; Rich Collins; Scott Durbin; Dave Poche; Scott "Smitty" Smith; Joe Menendez; David Sacks
- Producer: Kati Johnston
- Editor: Terry Blythe
- Running time: 24 minutes
- Production companies: Penn/Bright Entertainment; Zydeco Productions

Original release
- Network: Disney Channel (Playhouse Disney block)
- Release: September 6, 2008 – November 18, 2010
- Network: Disney Junior
- Release: February 14, 2011 – April 14, 2013

Imagination Movers is an American children's musical sitcom based on the format and music of the New Orleans music group of the same name and developed by Rick Gitelson that premiered its first two episodes consecutively on September 6, 2008, on Disney Channel's Playhouse Disney daily block. On February 14, 2011, the series was moved to the Disney Junior block on Disney Channel, which was rebranded from Playhouse Disney, until May 16, 2014.

Each episode of the series features songs written and performed by the aforementioned music group, whose official members all starred in the show.

On May 24, 2011, it was announced that the series would not be renewed for a fourth season and that it would end after the remaining episodes of the third season have aired, though the band itself can continue and is open to doing other projects.

After the final episode originally aired on April 14, 2013, reruns continued to air on Disney Junior until May 16, 2014, and the entire series (excluding the concert special and the Where Is Warehouse Mouse shorts) was made available on the Disney+ streaming service on February 28, 2020.

== Overview ==
The series focuses on the Imagination Movers: the smart and cowboy-like Smitty (Scott "Smitty" Smith; guitars, keyboards, vocals), and the hyperactive, misunderstood, burro-obsessed Scott (Scott K Durbin; vocals, mandolin, keyboards, percussion), the inventive and thoughtful Dave (Dave Poche; bass, vocals), and the stern and proud Rich (Rich Collins; drums, percussion, lead vocals), who dwell in the "Idea Warehouse", with doors leading to rooms such as a "Jungle Room", a "Wind Room", a "Beach Room", a "Farm Room", a "Lost & Found Room", a "Very Far Away Room", a "Sun Room", and a "Tropical Island Room". In every episode, they aid many clients with problems and think up creative ways to solve problems. They are often aided by Warehouse Mouse, the freeloading, wall-dwelling anthropomorphic mouse, Nina, their spirited and ever-cheerful neighbour, and Knit Knots, Nina's strict uncle who harbors a dislike for things he deems too "exciting". He appears in the first season, a flashback in the episode from Season 3, "Mouse Scouts", and the aforementioned March 2011 concert special, "Imagination Movers in Concert". Nina now works as a photographer, often visiting the Movers to take pictures for the local newspaper. In Season 3, Nina owns and operates the Idea Cafe. It is also revealed in the episode from Season 2 "Trouble in Paradise", that Nina is Hawaiian (much like Wendy Calio is in real life).

The Movers have special equipment to help them in their tasks. Rich has special "Scribble Sticks" that he can use to draw pictures and write words on the TV screen, Scott has "Wobble Goggles" that allow him to see things from a variety of perspectives, Dave has a special baseball cap that can store a variety of objects and Smitty has a special journal.

Each episode ends with the Movers singing "Jump Up" during which brief flashbacks of the episode's events play. In Season 1, the End Credits roll after this, but for Seasons 2 and 3, the End Credits roll during it.

== Episodes ==
Season	Episodes	Originally released		
Season	Episodes	First released	Last released	Network
1	26	September 6, 2008	August 15, 2009	Playhouse Disney
2	25	September 5, 2009	November 18, 2010	Playhouse Disney
3	24	February 14, 2011	April 14, 2013	Disney Junior

== Characters ==
- Smitty (played by Scott "Smitty" Smith) – Guitar, Vocals
- Scott (played by Scott Durbin) – Vocals, Keyboards, Mandolin, Banjo
- Dave (played by Dave Poche) – Bass, Vocals
- Rich (played by Rich Collins) – Drums, Percussion, Guitar, Lead Vocals
- Warehouse Mouse (voiced by Kevin Carlson)
- Nina (played by Wendy Calio)
- Knit Knots (played by Douglas Fisher) – Manager (Main: Season 1, Guest: Season 3)
- Voicemail (voiced by Kath Soucie)
- Princess Dee (played by Tania Gunadi)

Guest stars include French Stewart, David DeLuise, and Brian Beacock.

== Where Is Warehouse Mouse? ==
Where Is Warehouse Mouse? is a series of ten 3-minute shorts that aired on Playhouse Disney from August 24, 2009, to February 2, 2010. It featured the character Warehouse Mouse from the main series. The show was set within Season 2 of Imagination Movers. Shorts were produced with viewers watching Warehouse Mouse during his daily life.

No.	Title	Original release date
1	"Clock Shock"	August 24, 2009
Warehouse Mouse prepares to go to sleep, when his cuckoo clock wakes him up and he can't stop it from cuckooing. He then later decides to sleep with earmuffs on.
2	"Hammock Time"	August 31, 2009
Warehouse Mouse tries to read a book, but keeps falling off his hammock. He finally decides to untie the hammock and spreads it out on the floor.
3	"Going Bananas"	September 7, 2009
Warehouse Mouse tries to get the peel off of a banana. When he jumps on it, the banana pops out of its peel, bounces off the wall, goes through a fan where it is cut to slices, and then lands in a bowl.
4	"Fly Away"	September 14, 2009
A fly lands on Warehouse Mouse's strawberry and he tries to get rid of it. He then decides to eat the strawberry inside a net which he tried to catch the fly with.
5	"Balloon"	September 21, 2009
Warehouse Mouse trips over Rich's drumsticks and his helium balloon gets stuck up high in the warehouse. He finally builds a catapult to launch himself high enough to reach it, and then rides the balloon down to safety.
6	"Big Cheese"	September 28, 2009
Warehouse Mouse gets a giant piece of cheese from Nina, but he can't move it into his mouse hole. He tries about everything he can to get it in and finally decides to eat it outside of his mouse hole.
7	"Can Can't"	December 7, 2009
Warehouse Mouse tries to get an empty apple juice can into a high-up recycling bin. He gets it in by tipping the bin over, and putting it back up, but when he gets another can he needs to put that in and he has to tip the bin over again.
8	"Stuck On Me"	January 18, 2010
While wrapping Smitty's birthday present Warehouse Mouse gets a ribbon stuck on his tail. While trying to get it off, he ends up tying it into a perfect knot and sticks it on the present.
9	"Picture Perfect"	January 25, 2010
Warehouse Mouse has a problem hanging Smitty's picture, since it keeps swinging to an angle. He then decides to make all the pictures the same angle as Smitty's picture.
10	"No Space Case"	February 2, 2010
Warehouse Mouse is packing his suitcase for his holiday. However, he isn't able to close the suitcase. In the end, he decides to have his holiday at home.
