= List of Imagination Movers episodes =

American musical sitcom

Imagination Movers is an American musical sitcom developed by Rick Gitelson and based on the format and music of the New Orleans music group of the same name that premiered its first two episodes consecutively on September 6, 2008, on Disney Channel's Playhouse Disney/Disney Junior daily block.

The series finale aired on April 14, 2013.

== Series overview ==
Season	Episodes	Originally released		
Season	Episodes	First released	Last released	Network
1	26	September 6, 2008	August 15, 2009	Playhouse Disney
2	25	September 5, 2009	November 18, 2010	Playhouse Disney
3	24	February 14, 2011	April 14, 2013	Disney Junior

== Episodes ==
=== Season 1 (2008–2009) ===
No. overall	No. in season	Title	Directed by	Written by	Songs	Room	Original release date
1	1	"No Noise Is Good Noise"	Francine McDougall	Randi Barnes, Rick Gitelson and Scott Gray	"I Heard That", "Nina's Song"	The Noisy Room	September 6, 2008
The Movers investigate the source of a loud noise that keeps interrupting their songs.
2	2	"The Tooth Hurts"	Francine McDougall	Scott Gray, Rick Gitelson and Randi Barnes	"Toothache", "Warehouse Mouse", "Lost"	The Maze Room	September 6, 2008
Warehouse Mouse has a cavity and hides to avoid a trip to the vet, so the Movers try to catch him.
3	3	"Bad Hair Day"	David Kendall	Scott Gray and Rick Gitelson	"Bad Hair", "Take a Picture"	-	September 8, 2008
Scott's hair causes problems when Nina tries to take a picture for the newspaper.
4	4	"A Puppy Problem"	Jonathan Judge	Rick Gitelson and Scott Gray	"Playing Catch", "Puppy Dog"	The Squeaky Toy Room	September 9, 2008
The Movers try to figure out who the owner of a lost dog is.
5	5	"Body Language"	Henry Chan	Rick Gitelson, Scott Gray and Michael G. Stern	"Buckets and Cans", "Get Up"	The Drum Room	September 10, 2008
The Movers try to communicate with Drab Dull (Shayne Tingle). Guest Stars: Shayne Tingle as Drab Dull
6	6	"Super Goop"	Jonathan Judge	Sheila Dinsmore, Rick Gitelson and Scott Gray	"Shakeable You", "What's in the Fridge?"	The Really Cold Room	September 11, 2008
Dave's "Super Goop" causes Rich and Smitty to be accidentally glued together.
7	7	"Heavy Reading"	Henry Chan	Scott Gray and Rick Gitelson	"Good Ideas", "Rollin'"	The Wheel Room	September 12, 2008
The guys try to move around Peggy's (Tracy Martin) world's largest phone book. Guest Stars: Tracy Martin as Peggy
8	8	"It's a Breeze"	David Kendall	Scott Gray and Rick Gitelson	"Gust of Wind", "Give Me Your Hand"	The Wind Room	September 13, 2008
The Movers try to determine the source of a strong wind blowing through the warehouse especially at Knit Knots' office.
9	9	"A Bee Story"	Joe Menendez	Rick Gitelson and Scott Gray	"Clean My Room", "Springtime", "Try Again"	The Magnet Room	September 15, 2008
The Movers try to capture a Robo-Bee using only their imagination.
10	10	"The Un-Party"	Jonathan Judge	Scott Gray and Rick Gitelson	"Birthday", "Have Some Fun Today"	The Opposite Room	September 17, 2008
The Movers have a party for Knit Knots' birthday but have to avoid anything that Knit Knots finds "exciting" for it.
11	11	"Too Cool"	David Kendall	Scott Gray and Rick Gitelson	"Sunblock", "Recipe (Stir it Up)"	The Really Cold Room, The Sun Room	September 18, 2008
The warehouse is freezing cold, so the guys investigate the source.
12	12	"Sneeze and Thank You"	Henry Chan	Randi Barnes, Rick Gitelson and Scott Gray	"Ah-Choo", "Clean My Room"	-	September 20, 2008
The Movers and Nina try to determine what is causing Dave to sneeze so much.
13	13	"Bucket of Trouble"	Jonathan Judge	Rick Gitelson	"Do It By Myself", "Pop", "Springtime (instrumental)"	The Bubble Garden	September 22, 2008
The Movers make a commercial, but Rich accidentally gets his foot stuck in a bucket.
14	14	"Finders Key-pers"	Henry Chan	Laurie Israel & Rachel Ruderman, Rick Gitelson, Scott Gray and Randi Barnes	"Idea Box", "Where'd You Go", "Warehouse Mouse"	The Lost and Found Room	September 27, 2008
The guys help Knit Knots locate his missing keys.
15	15	"Wayne Dance"	Henry Chan	Randi Barnes, Rick Gitelson and Scott Gray	"Get Up", "Shakeable You"	The Dancing Room	October 4, 2008
The Movers help Wayne (David Magidoff) learn how to dance. Guest Stars: David Magidoff as Wayne
16	16	"Hiccups"	Francine McDougall	Laurie Israel & Rachel Ruderman, Rick Gitelson and Scott Gray	"Boing Cluck Cluck", "The Boom Boom Song"	The Not Too Scary Room	October 11, 2008
Knit Knots is unable to finish a recording after he gets the hiccups. Note: This episode aired following the premiere of the Mickey Mouse Clubhouse episode Mickey's Silly Problem.
17	17	"All Broken Up"	Jonathan Winfrey	Scott Gray, Rick Gitelson and Randi Barnes	"Fix it Up", "We Can Work Together"	The Clock Room	October 18, 2008
The Movers accidentally break Nina's clock and then try to fix it.
18	18	"Big Pumpkin Problem"	Joe Menendez	Randi Barnes, Rick Gitelson and Scott Gray	"Grow the Pumpkin", "Now We're Cooking"	The Garden Room	October 25, 2008
Smitty is entering the pumpkin contest. The Movers grow Smitty's giant pumpkin that has trouble getting through the warehouse door.
19	19	"Have a Ball"	Joe Menendez	Sharon Soboil, Rick Gitelson, Scott Gray and Randi Barnes	"Kick It", "Playing Catch"	The Sports Room	November 8, 2008
Dean (Michael Battle) asks the guys to help him catch a football with a small problem: he cannot see very well. Note: This episode was aired following the premiere of the Mickey Mouse Clubhouse episode Mickey's Thanks-A-Bunch Day. Guest Stars: Michael Battle as Dean
20	20	"Knit Knots Gets Stuck"	Jonathan Winfrey	Randi Barnes, Rick Gitelson and Scott Gray	"Please and Thank You", "Paint the Day Away"	The Painting Room	November 22, 2008
The guys try to help Knit Knots get out of a jumpsuit designed by Dave.
21	21	"Present Problem"	Francine McDougall	Scott Gray, Rick Gitelson and Randi Barnes	"Give a Gift", "Gotcha", "It's Christmas"	The Scale Room	December 6, 2008
The guys try to determine which unlabeled present belongs to each Mover.
22	22	"Who's Afraid of the Big Bad Mouse?"	Skot Bright	Randi Barnes, Rick Gitelson and Scott Gray	"Fix It Up", "Farm"	The Farm Room	January 31, 2009
A television repairman named Joe (Frank Crim) is afraid of Warehouse Mouse, so the Movers try to have him around other small animals to make him not so afraid of mice. Guest Stars: Frank Crim as Joe
23	23	"March of the Movers"	Jonathan Winfrey	Scott Gray, Rick Gitelson and Randi Barnes	"What's in the Fridge? (instrumental)", "March Like a Mover", "Today's Parade"	The Outside Room	March 1, 2009
A trombonist named Maggie (Monica McSwain) has trouble playing and marching at the same time. Guest Stars: Monica McSwain as Maggie
24	24	"Treasure of the Warehouse"	Joe Menendez	Scott Gray, Rick Gitelson and Randi Barnes	"My Favorite Snack", "Jungle Room"	The Jungle Room	March 21, 2009
A famous treasure hunter named Brick Ford (Julian Stone) needs help finding his father's treasure. Guest Stars: Julian Stone as Brick Ford
25	25	"Mother's Day Gift"	Francine McDougall	Scott Gray, Rick Gitelson and Randi Barnes	"Mother in You", "I Want My Mommy"	The Gift Room	May 9, 2009
The movers help Nina find the perfect Mother's Day present for her mom.
26	26	"Rockabye Rich"	Joe Menendez	Randi Barnes, Rick Gitelson and Scott Gray	"Sleeping Bag", "One More Book", "Last Song"	The Relaxation Room	August 15, 2009
Rich has trouble getting to sleep.

=== Season 2 (2009–2010) ===
No. overall	No. in season	Title	Songs	Original release date
27	1	"Captain Terrific"	"Bounce, Up! Up! Up!"	September 5, 2009
Captain Terrific (Daran Norris) is having trouble flying, and the Imagination Movers try to find out why. Guest Stars: Daran Norris as Captain Terrific
28	2	"It's a Mystery"	"I'd Eat it Anyway", "Here We Go"	September 12, 2009
Someone is stealing the Imagination Movers' food, but they have to go in their van and find out who took their food.
29	3	"Mousesitting"	"The Wah-Wah Song", "Have Some Fun Today"	September 19, 2009
Warehouse Mouse is babysitting his crying nephew, Gouda (Kristen Charney), while his sister is at the vet's office and the Imagination Movers try to find a way to make him stop crying.
30	4	"Slip Slidin' Away"	"Slippin and-a Slidin'", "My Friends and Me"	September 26, 2009
Dave has used a little too much wax on the floor, and the Imagination Movers can't stop slipping and sliding around the warehouse. They need to find a way to get to the magic wax remover.
31	5	"Second Chance Pants"	"Everybody's Game", "Riding My Bike"	October 10, 2009
The famous bike rider "Pants" (Willie Garson) is having trouble riding his bike. The Imagination Movers help him. (Guest Nancy O'Dell) Guest Stars: Willie Garson as Pants Armstrong, Nancy O'Dell as Becky Collins
32	6	"A Monster Problem"	"Knocking at Your Door", "Friendly Guy"	October 24, 2009
A monster (Tom Kenny) comes to the idea warehouse on Halloween so he can get help to become less scary. Guest Stars: Tom Kenny as Eddy the Monster
33	7	"A Fairy Tale Ending"	"One More Book", "When You Grow Up"	November 14, 2009
The Imagination Movers are surprised when Cinderella (Nicole Gale Anderson) turns up at their door. (Guest Jason Dolley) Guest Stars: Nicole Anderson as Cinderella, Jason Dolley as Prince Charming
34	8	"Mouse and Home"	"Paint the Day Away", "Springtime!"	November 21, 2009
The Imagination Movers try to help Warehouse Mouse find a new home that will fit his new, bigger bed.
35	9	"Happy Ha Ha Holidays!"	"Tag!", "Christmas Time"	December 5, 2009
The Imagination Movers help Santa Claus (David Titus) when he loses his special "ho ho ho" laugh, but his elves took the Christmas present and it's all up to the Imagination Movers. Guest Stars: David Titus as Santa Claus
36	10	"Snow Day"	"We Can Work Together", "Let the Sun Shine In"	December 12, 2009
The Imagination Movers work to free themselves and Nina when a tremendous snowstorm traps them inside the Idea Warehouse.
37	11	"Muffin Man"	"Snackin' ABC's", "Now We're Cooking"	January 16, 2010
The Muffin Man (Duff Goldman) has made some muffins that everyone in the town loves and has many orders to fill. Guest Stars: Duff Goldman as Baker Ben
38	12	"Farmhouse Mouse"	"Sunrise/Sunset", "Seven Days a Week"	February 6, 2010
Warehouse Mouse's cousin, Farmhouse Mouse (James Murray), visits the Warehouse. The Imagination Movers and Nina help to solve conflict when the mice disagree on what activities to enjoy.
39	13	"Tooth Fairy"	"Can You Do It?", "Last Song"	February 28, 2010
The new tooth fairy (Cheri Oteri) comes to the idea warehouse when kids keep awaking before she can get a hold of their teeth. Guest Stars: Cheri Oteri as Gladys
40	14	"Ace Mulligan"	"Everybody's Game", "Luck of the Irish"	March 13, 2010
A pro golfer (Travis Guba) loses his lucky hat and enlists the Movers to help him make a putt again. Guest Stars: Travis Guba as Ace Mulligan
41	15	"Out of Tunes"	"Recipe (Stir it Up!)", Here We Go"	March 26, 2010
A blues musician (Chris Thomas King) is out of ideas. But then the Imagination Movers make some tunes. Guest Stars: Chris Thomas King as T-Bone Crosby
42	16	"Power Play"	"I Am Energy", "Gust Of Wind"	April 17, 2010
The Movers are using too much electricity, and decide to see what they can do to be greener. They add solar panels, a water wheel and a wind mill and generate their own power.
43	17	"Bye Bye Butterfly"	"Easy Come, Easy Go", "Butterfly"	May 1, 2010
A rare butterfly moves into the warehouse, and the Imagination Movers must help an entomologist (Lauren Pritchard) study it. Guest Stars: Lauren Pritchard as Dr. Felicia Flutter
44	18	"Birthday Ball"	"Try Again", "Going to Have a Party"	May 22, 2010
A famous baseball player (Joey Fatone) comes to the Imagination Movers when a baseball game and his son's birthday party land on the same day. Guest Stars: Joey Fatone as Joey Giordano
45	19	"Trouble in Paradise"	"Riding the Waves", "On My Way Home (Hawaiian Lullaby)"	June 26, 2010
The Imagination Movers and Warehouse Mouse help Nina find a Hawaiian talent to perform at her Grandmother's birthday in Hawaii by doing anything that is popular in Hawaii.
46	20	"Gimme Strength"	"Getting Stronger", "My Favorite Snack"	July 24, 2010
The Imagination Movers help strongman Gunther the Great (Sam Zeller) regain strength through healthy eating, weight lifting and muscle-building exercises for a show in the circus. Guest Stars: Sam Zeller as Gunther the Great
47	21	"Nina Gets the Giggles"	"Get Serious", "Can You Do It?"	September 13, 2010
Nina can't stop her giggling while planning to play her harp right before a music recital, so the Imagination Movers try to help her before her recital. (Guest French Stewart)
48	22	"Seeing Stars"	"Going to the Movies", "Gotcha!"	November 15, 2010
The Imagination Movers help a famous movie director named Stanley Spillburger. Guest Stars: Matthew Porretta as Stanley Spillburger
49	23	"Mouse Day"	"Idea Box", "It's a Holiday"	November 16, 2010
Warehouse Mouse is disappointed to learn that there isn't a holiday for mice, so the guys try to come up with the perfect holiday celebration for their friend.
50	24	"Knight Time"	"The Boom Boom Song", "There Once Was a Knight"	November 17, 2010
The Imagination Movers and Nina help a timid, cowardly knight named Sir Fears-a-lot (Brian Stepanek) conquer his fear of the dark so he can rescue a princess. Guest Stars: Brian Stepanek as Sir Fears-a-lot
51	25	"The Tale of Captain Kiddo"	"Caribbean Rhapsody", "Sensible Life of a Pirate"	November 18, 2010
The Imagination Movers set out to discover Captain Kiddo's (Joshua Gomez) hidden pirate skills in time for him to set sail again. Guest Stars: Joshua Gomez as Captain Kiddo

=== Season 3 (2011–2013) ===
No. overall	No. in season	Title	Songs	Original release date
52	1	"Goldilocks and the Four Movers"	"My Favorite Snack", "Please and Thank You"	February 14, 2011
The Movers must help Goldilocks (Abbie Cobb) fix her friendship with the three bears. After they Brainstorm, Nina enters and suggests that Goldilocks and the Movers invite the bears to a picnic. (Guest Shane Partlow) Guest Stars: Abbie Cobb as Goldilocks, Shane Partlow as Petey the Messenger
53	2	"The Idea Cafe"	"Breakfast Time Holler", "Now We're Cooking"	February 25, 2011
The Imagination Movers find out that their favorite cafe is closing. (Guest Reginald VelJohnson) Guest Stars: Reginald VelJohnson as Bernie
54	3	"Wishful Thinking"	"Magic", "Patience"	March 11, 2011
The Imagination Movers help a genie (Brian Beacock) restore his wish granting powers. Guest Stars: Brian Beacock as Al the Genie
55	4	"Slam Dunk Solution"	"Robot Chase Song", "Bounce"	March 25, 2011
Smitty's too busy water the plants. The Movers find someone to replace Smitty. Richard "Rip" Hamilton of the Detroit Pistons shoots hoops with the Imagination Movers. Guest Stars: Richard "Rip" Hamilton as Himself
56	5	"One Cool Mover"	"Boing Cluck Cluck", "Be Yourself"	April 15, 2011
Clutch (David DeLuise) stops by the Idea Warehouse to help the Imagination Movers get his motorcycle fixed.
57	6	"The Prince Frog"	"Wanna Be a Frog", "Kick It"	May 6, 2011
The Imagination Movers help an out of place prince (Eric Artell) turn back into the frog he once was before he magical transformation.
58	7	"Fathers Know Best"	"Calling All Movers", "Dad Says"	June 17, 2011
The Imagination Movers plan a Father's Day barbecue.
59	8	"Castaways"	"Take a Look at This Place", "On My Way Home (Hawaiian Lullaby)"	July 1, 2011
The Imagination Movers help Nina prepare for Hawaiian Day at the Idea Cafe.
60	9	"Haunted Halloween"	"Dance Like It's Halloween", "The Boom Boom Song"	October 28, 2011
Pete the Plumber (Brian Stepanek) gets lost in The Idea Warehouse and is mistaken for various scary monsters. Guest Stars: Brian Stepanek as Pete the Plumber, Tom Kenny as Eddy the Monster
61	10	"A Little Elf Esteem"	"Reindeer Party", "Give a Gift"	December 23, 2011
The Imagination Movers help a Christmas elf (Gloria Garayua) lift her holiday spirits and believe in herself.
62	11	"Snorey Morrie"	"I Heard That", "Where'd You Go?"	April 2, 2012
Dave's uncle comes to visit the warehouse, but keeps everyone up with his loud snoring.
63	12	"Walkaway Walkie"	"What's That Sound?", "Puppy Dog"	April 3, 2012
Dave misplaces his walkie talkie so he uses its sounds to find it.
64	13	"Award to the Wise"	"On Your Marks", "Eureka! (Feel the Beat)"	April 4, 2012
Dave gets a science award for one of his inventions.
65	14	"Nina's Day Off"	"Gotta Get Our Work Done", "We Can Work Together"	April 5, 2012
The Imagination Movers decide to run the Idea Cafe while Nina takes a day off.
66	15	"Say Cheese"	"Cheese", "Try Again"	April 6, 2012
The Imagination Movers try to find out why a prized goat has stopped making milk. They know that Nina needs the milk for her special grilled cheese sandwiches.
67	16	"Have You Ever Seen a Unicorn?"	"Shakable You", "I've Never Seen a Unicorn"	May 7, 2012
The Imagination Movers help a Princess (Tania Gunadi) try to catch a Unicorn.
68	17	"Scott and the Beanstalk"	"On Your Marks", "Teddy Bear Song"	May 21, 2012
The Imagination Movers try to rescue Scott's Teddy Bear.
69	18	"Uffle-Fluffs"	"Boing Cluck Cluck", "Spaceman"	February 18, 2013
Fuzzy creatures from the moon multiply in the warehouse and the Imagination Movers need to round them all up.
70	19	"Switcheroo"	"We're on a Mission", "Up, Up, Up"	February 19, 2013
Rich and Warehouse Mouse switch bodies with each other.
71	20	"Shall We Dance"	"The Greatest Dance", "Get Up"	February 20, 2013
Two professional ballet dancers need the Imagination Movers' help with their performance.
72	21	"Mouse Scouts"	"Everybody's Game", "Cheese", "Getting Stronger"	February 21, 2013
The Imagination Movers try and convince Warehouse Mouse to join the Mouse Scouts.
73	22	"How the West Was Fun"	"Good Guys", "Up, Up, Up"	February 22, 2013
The Imagination Movers try to help a cowboy go across a canyon.
74	23	"Aloha Nina"	"Nina's Song", "We Can Work Together", "Now We're Cooking", "Here We Go", "On My Way Home (Hawaiian Lullaby)"	April 7, 2013
The Imagination Movers think Nina will move away to Hawaii and panic.
75	24	"Save the Warehouse"	"Here We Go", "Moving On"	April 14, 2013
A city planner named Ms. Crump (who mainly goes by the name The Diana) visits the Warehouse with the intention of building a parking lot on the space, so the Movers try to convince her that would be a mistake.

==== Imagination Movers in Concert (2011) ====
Originally aired on March 6, 2011, there is a special episode that aired during Season 3.

No.	Title	Songs	Original release date
1	"Imagination Movers in Concert"	"My Favorite Snack", "Shakable You", "On My Way Home", and more	March 6, 2011
