= Imagination Movers =

American children's band

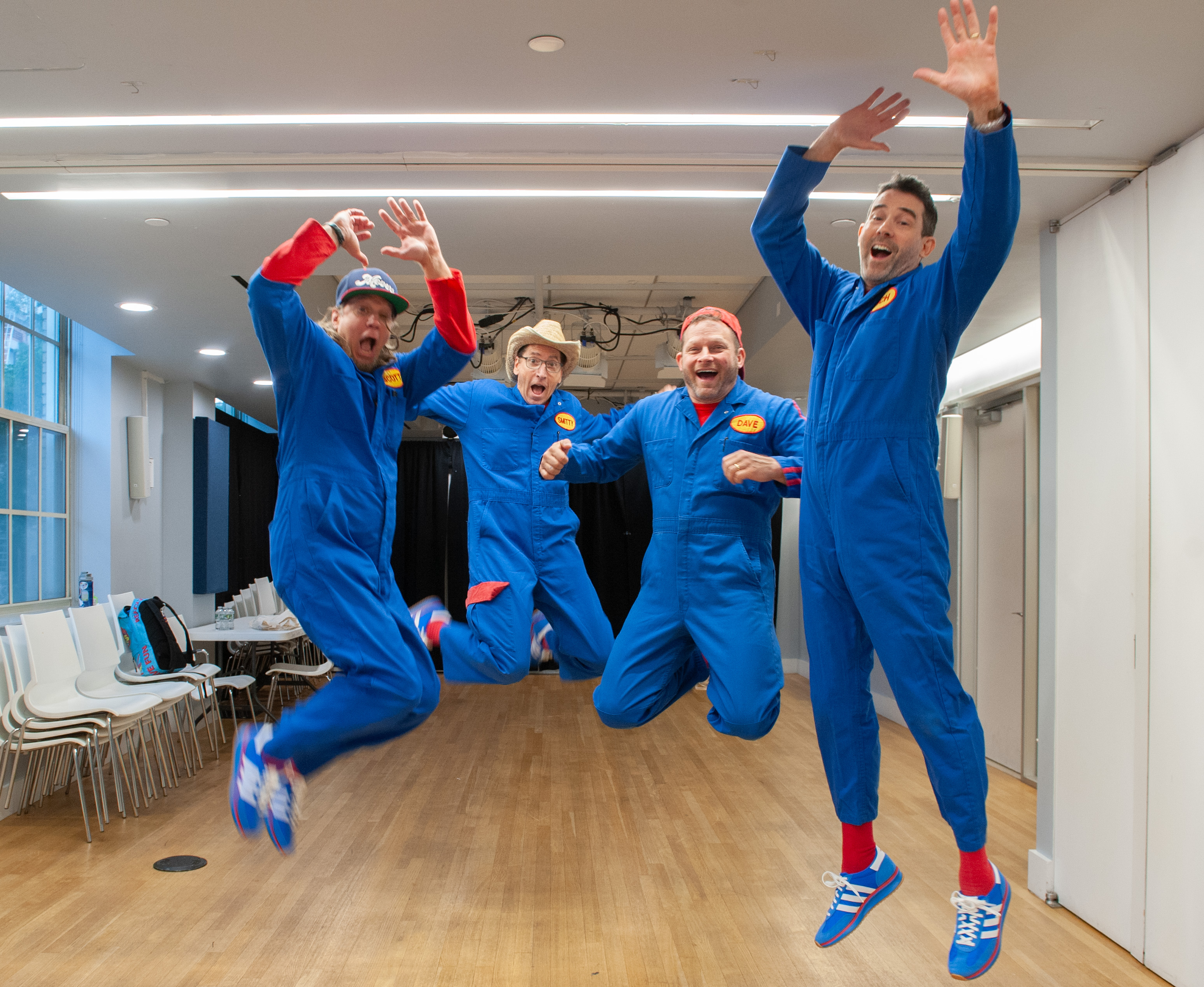
- Scott Durbin, Scott "Smitty" Smith, Dave Poche, and Rich Collins in 2026

Background information
- Origin: New Orleans, Louisiana, United States
- Genres: Children's music, ska, indie rock, alternative
- Years active: 2002–present
- Labels: Walt Disney, Rec Room, Razor & Tie, Imagination Movers, LLC/Astronaut Walk Records
- Members: Rich Collins; Scott K Durbin; Dave Poche; Scott "Smitty" Smith
- Website: http://www.imaginationmovers.com

The Imagination Movers are an American children's band formed in New Orleans, Louisiana, in 2002.

The line-up includes drummer and multi-instrumentalist Rich Collins, keyboardist and banjo/mandolin player Scott K Durbin, bassist Dave Poche, and guitarist Scott "Smitty" Smith. Members of the group were longtime friends and neighbors. They started with the four members seeing a need to encourage creativity in children, provide positive male role models, and create music and content that "spoke to them, not down to them." Durbin worked in combination with the other Movers to create a live-action television show that was a combination of shows like Mister Rogers' Neighborhood, Captain Kangaroo, and The Monkees, with the music they enjoyed, such as the Beastie Boys, The Police, and U2.

In their early days, the four Movers worked every night after their children's bedtime, from 9 p.m. to midnight, writing songs, developing plot lines, and fine tuning the concept, including creating Knit Knots, Carla (who became Nina), Warehouse Mouse, as well as developing their gadgets.

== Career ==
Created by four friends in New Orleans, the Imagination Movers began as a television/music concept that was pitched to local PBS affiliates. WLAE-TV was the first to take an interest in the group and later introduced them to Beth Courtney, the President and chief executive officer at Louisiana Public Broadcasting. Soon after, LPB began airing one-minute music videos written and produced by the Imagination Movers themselves.

The Movers built a sizable regional following by setting educational songs for children to melodies and rhythms that adults also appreciate. They sold more than 100,000 copies of their self-produced CDs and DVDs. Their three indie CDs: Good Ideas, Calling All Movers, and Eight Feet along with their grassroots DVD Stir It Up have, combined, won 14 national awards, from such groups as the National Association of Parenting Publications and Parents' Choice. Moreover, Kids Place Live put many of the Movers early catalog into heavy rotation, further increasing the bands national audience.

In 2005, Disney took notice and initiated negotiations to add the Movers to the company's roster. The Movers rejected deals from Disney twice, insisting on staying the PBS route. Then, Hurricane Katrina interrupted all plans in August when the flood protection designed and built by the Army Corps of Engineers to protect New Orleans failed. The resulting floodwater destroyed the band's office and the homes and jobs of Collins, Durbin, and Poche, but the deal was signed in the spring of 2006.

A pilot episode was produced in 2006, and music videos started appearing on Disney Channel's Playhouse Disney block. Soon after, in 2008, Walt Disney Records introduced the Imagination Movers' music to the nation with the release of the Movers' first nationally released CD, Juice Box Heroes. The album's tracklisting was curated from the Movers first three independent albums: Good Ideas, Calling All Movers, and Eight Feet.

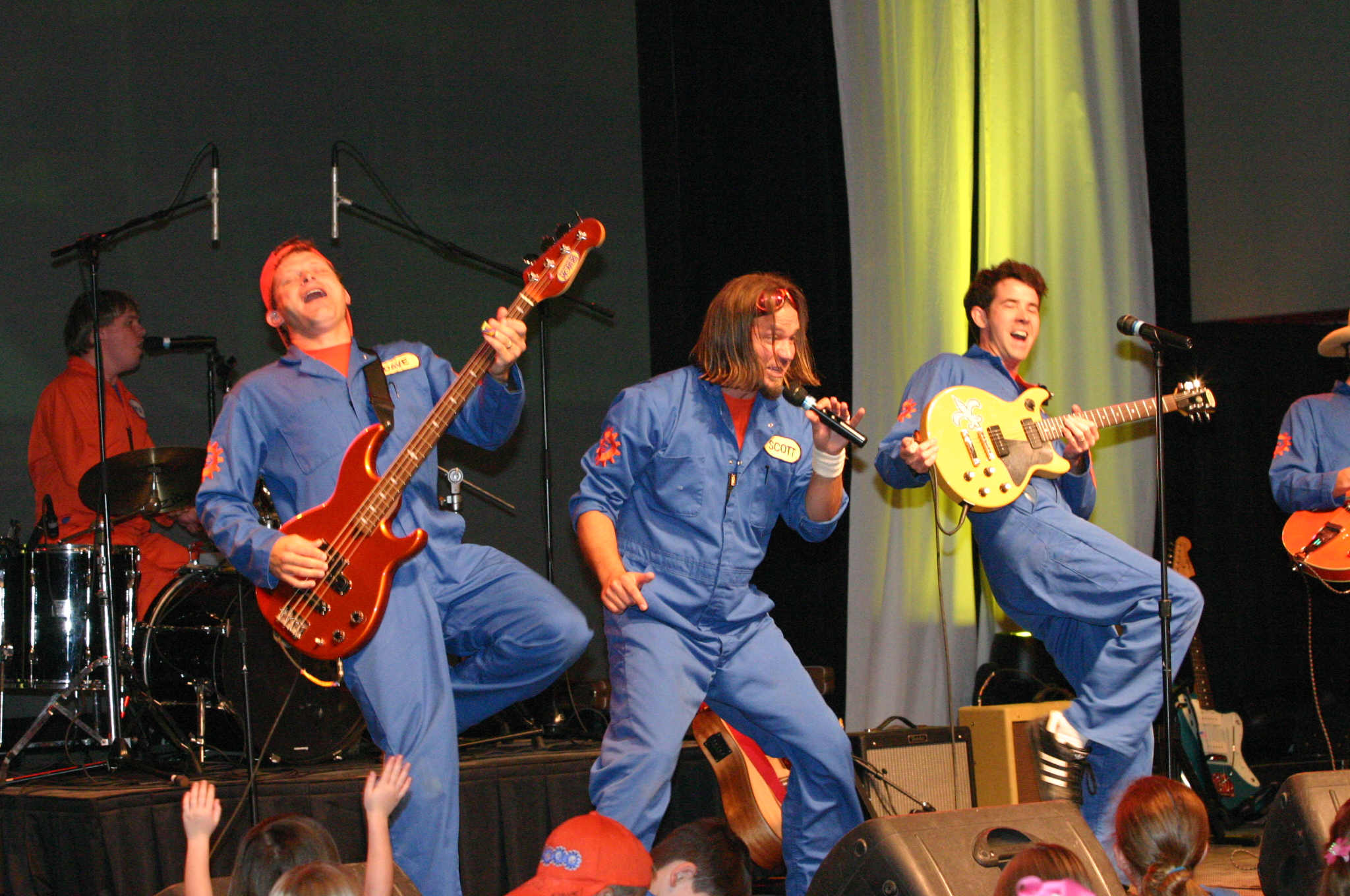
The Imagination Movers in 2007 in New York City

In September 2008, a 22-minute show featuring the group began airing on the Disney Channel's preschool programming block known as Playhouse Disney, and eventually airing on Playhouse Disney's replacement, Disney Junior. The Movers starred and were also co-executive producers of the show. Despite creating the show, the Movers were forced to settle for a placard stating the show was based on the music and format of the Imagination Movers. Moreover, the show was incorrectly labeled a variety show by the channel, thereby cheating the Movers out of a created by credit and considerably underpaying them for their creative IP.

The Movers wrote and performed all the songs heard on their eponymous show. Moreover, the Imagination Movers have received critical acclaim for their live concert performances. Indie Kids Rock reviewed the group, saying they were "the U2 of kids music with a big anthemic pop/rock sound, catchy lyrics, & of course, imagination".

In October 2009, the Imagination Movers started the Live from the Idea Warehouse Concert Tour 2009. Traveling from mid-October to mid-December 2009 their live performances include many of their favorite songs and dancing, as well as video appearances of Warehouse Mouse. The success of the tour led the Movers to grace the cover of Pollstar, a professional trade publication for the concert and live music industry.

Beginning in early February 2011 and wrapping up in late May 2011, the Imagination Movers presented their In a Big Warehouse Concert Tour, playing more than 100 shows in 50+ cities across North America.

From March to October 2012, the Imagination Movers toured North America on their post-Disney Rock-O-Matic tour. The show maintained several elements of the original TV concept, such as an on-stage "idea emergency" and several sets from their older catalog. The tour promoted the Imagination Movers' new album/DVD release, Rock-O-Matic, which featured all new music from the band. During the ROM tour, the Movers fired and sued their manager for promoting the interests of a rival group.

In the summer of 2013, Imagination Movers released a digital-only release, marking their fourth album on Disney records, entitled Back in Blue. The album consists of 26 songs, covering most of the songs written for season three of the TV series and any other unreleased material penned by the Movers for the television show.

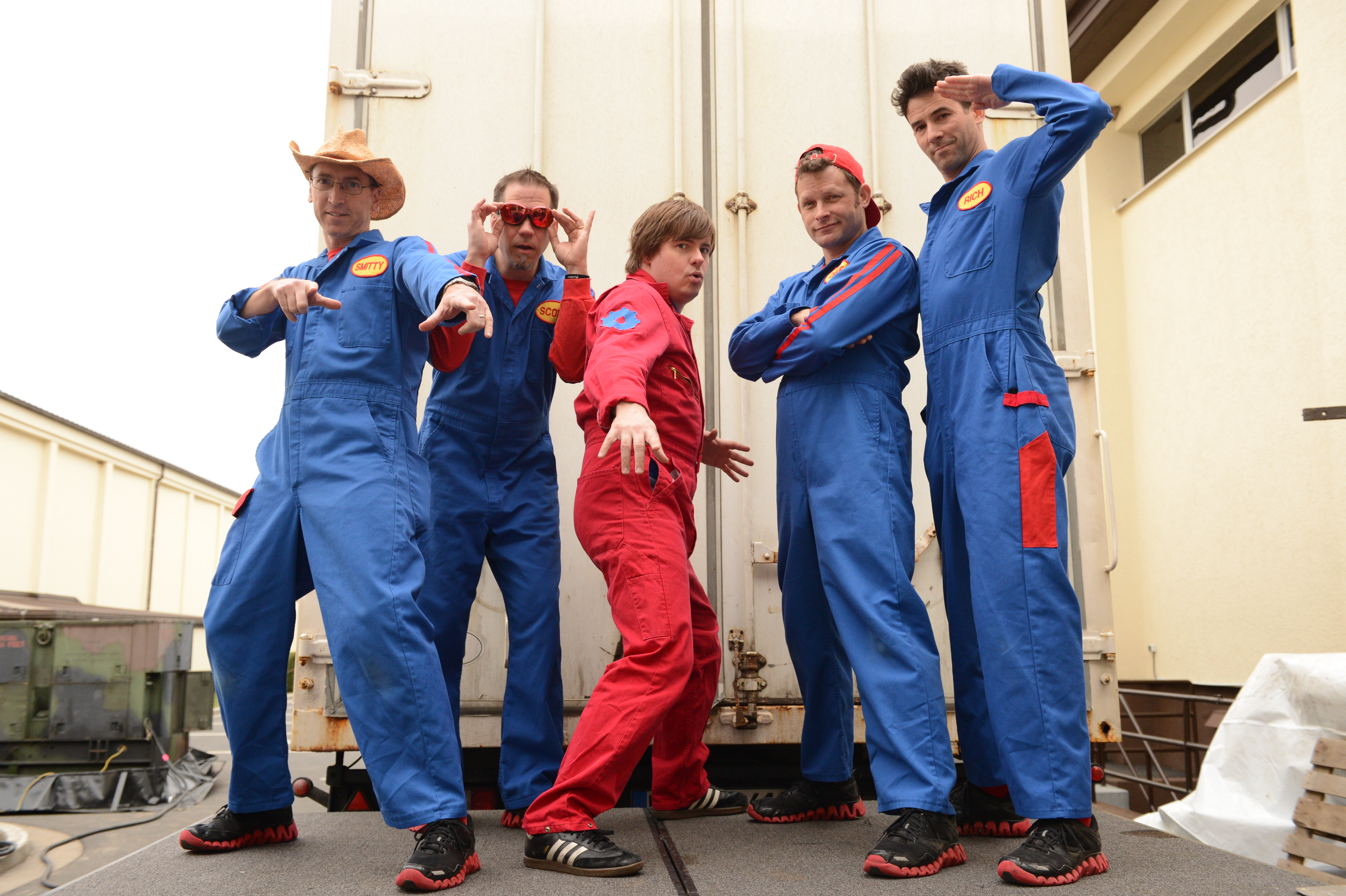
The Imagination Movers in 2013 at Spangdahlem Air Base, Germany

In fall 2013, the Imagination Movers teamed with Blue Cross Blue Shield Association to present the Think Big Tour, an educational 60-minute concert traveling throughout the state of Louisiana.

In May 2014, Disney Junior Canada presented the Imagination Movers Live in Concert Tour with special guest Warehouse Mouse. The tour covered seventeen Canadian cities, starting September 13 in Victoria, BC, and ending in Glace Bay, NS, on October 2, with most of the dates selling out. The tour featured the Movers performing songs from their hit Disney Junior series and their chart-topping album Back In Blue, which debuted as the No. 1 Children's Album on iTunes in Canada.

During the fall of 2014, 9 Story Entertainment announced that it had entered into a development deal with the Imagination Movers. 9 Story teamed with the band on a concept called Super Movers, a fresh new animated/hybrid program targeted towards children ages 4 to 7 years old, bursting with comedy, adventure, and music. The show's main message is that "Everybody has the power to become a superhero!" Two years later, the Movers released the single Super Movers, an upbeat, ska-inspired audio treat and a musical video, which was the trailer for the animated show. The song hit number one on the Children's Charts on both iTunes and Amazon in the US and Canada. The animated series, however, never found a network or streaming platform and was eventually abandoned.

In 2015, the Imagination Movers released their ninth album, a CD/DVD entitled Licensed to Move. The project was crowd funded through PledgeMusic. The album featured such hits as Here Comes Summer, Dump Truck, and "Following My Mom Around".

In 2017, the Imagination Movers crowdfunded their tenth album through Indiegogo, entitled 10-4. The album was released on December 14, 2018. The song Is That Wrong landed on the 13 Under 13 Countdown. The album also features a collaboration with Lisa Loeb, entitled Butterfly Wings as well as Tow Truck with The Durbulence, a moniker used by Scott Durbin's son, Brewster Durbin, a 2018 John Lennon Songwriting winner in the Hip-Hop category.

In the summer of 2021, the Movers released their first new product, a single called Happy and the Happy to Be Here EP, through children's music label 8 Pound Gorilla Records. Two music videos were part of the release, including Happy and Robot Breaks Down, which can be viewed on the Movers YouTube channel. The 76 episodes of the Imagination Movers television show, which initially aired on Playhouse Disney and later Disney Junior from 2008 to 2013, were made available on Disney+.

In 2022, the Mover song Watermelon Meow Meow became a viral hit, averaging over 1 million monthly streams on Spotify alone. Watermelon Meow Meow's music video commemorates the song's 10-year anniversary and success on streaming platforms The song surpassed 20,000,000 streams on Spotify.

As forerunners of alternative music for children of all ages and their families, the Movers celebrated over 20+ years of entertaining families throughout the world in 2023, by releasing a compilation album entitled Coveralls: Songs from the Imagination Movers.

The compilation of artists includes indie-pop groups Royal Teeth and Givers, ska band Mustard Plug, the Brooklyn-based alt band Laundry Day, Canadian shimmer pop Soul Push, surf rockers One South Lark and The Durbulence, along with the rootsy, Celtic-influenced sounds of Carbon Leaf. The album has received superlative reviews with songs like Happy by Soul Push making the editorial New in Alternative Music playlist on Apple Music.

On March 1, 2024, the Imagination Movers performed their first-ever show for older audiences at the Tipitina's music venue in New Orleans. During the set, the Movers performed many of their hits along with covers of popular songs from Beastie Boys, 5 Seconds of Summer, The Killers, and Harry Styles, to name a few.

At the beginning of 2024, the Movers released the first single from their upcoming 11th studio album, Blue Skies. The quirky, interactive earworm, Ice Cream Sandwich, immediately found its way on a Spotify editorial playlist for new music for kids, and was quickly accompanied by an eclectic music video, directed by Mover Rich's daughter, Abby Collins.

On April 1, 2024, the Movers released their second single Road Trip. The Daily Advertiser described it as the perfect family road trip song. Moreover, the song was named a finalist in the 2024 Great American Songwriting Contest. Summer Campers marked the third single release on May 10, 2024, and was one of three songs that achieved Number One hits on Kids.Radio, a children's app and streaming service. The others being What I Couldn't Do Yesterday I Can Do Today and Please and Thank You from Calling All Movers also hit number one.

A month later, the Movers celebrated their unofficial birthday, June 18, by releasing their 11th album Blue Skies. Music Critic David Kunian had this to say about the release, "A great record that kids will really like with catchy melodies, down-to-earth, fun lyrics and musical styles that reach from ’90s ska, ’80s new wave, and 2000s power pop." Music videos from the album can be seen on YouTube and include Jet Packs, Duck Race, Ice Cream Sandwich, and Road Trip.

On September 27, the Movers released their cover of the 5 Seconds of Summer song Youngblood, recorded live during their 18+ show at Tipitina's. The Tipitina's live show performance in March made the Top 5 shows of 2024 as determined by Antigravity Magazine, a monthly magazine specializing in original content that spotlights New Orleans artists and those visiting the area.

In 2025, the Movers released four singles, Fine (The Sharing Song), Take Time, Kindergarten Graduation (The Swell Version), and Numbers (EK Meatball Remix) in advance of their 12th album The Carryover Effect Mixtape. The Movers dropped the ten song album on August 29, 2025. Review of the album stated, "Artistically complex and enjoyable for all audiences while having easy-to-understand messages palatable to children."

== Members ==
=== Rich Collins ===
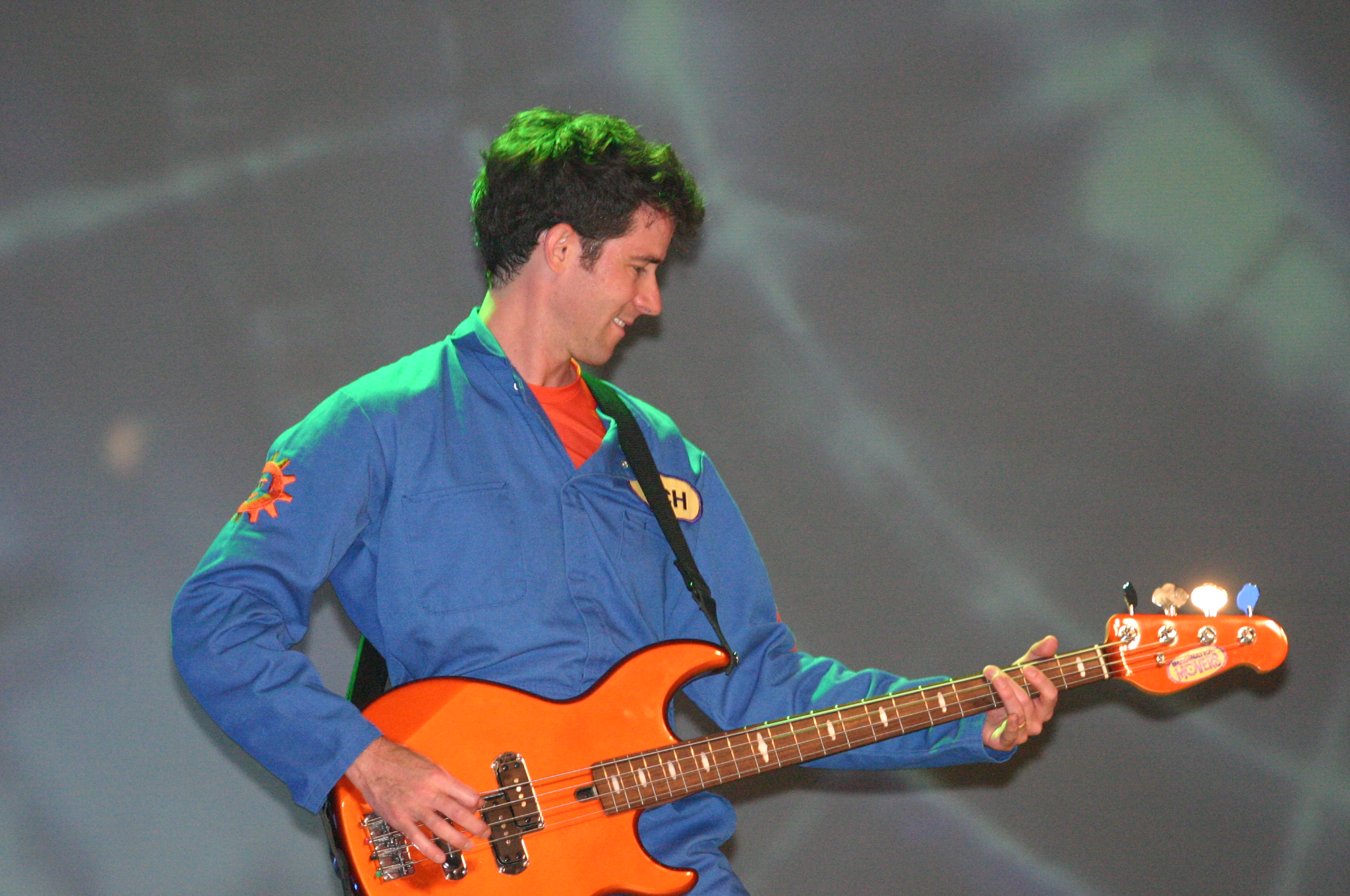
Rich Collins in 2007

Collins, a multi-instrumentalist, works the controls in the recording studio. He is the Imagination Movers' drummer on the television show but plays guitar, bass, and occasionally drums in concert. His drum sticks double as "Scribble Sticks", which he uses to draw words and pictures on the TV screen.

Originally from Silver Spring, Maryland, Collins graduated from The Catholic University of America and relocated to New Orleans in the early 1990s to form a rock band, Dubly. He is married and has five children, his home was destroyed in 2005, during Hurricane Katrina. Before the Imagination Movers, Collins worked as a journalist. He also worked on his own music and released his second album, Golden Pick, in 2016, following the release of his solo debut, That Escalated Quickly, in 2013.

Presently, Rich works as a business reporter for the Times-Picayune.

=== Scott Durbin ===
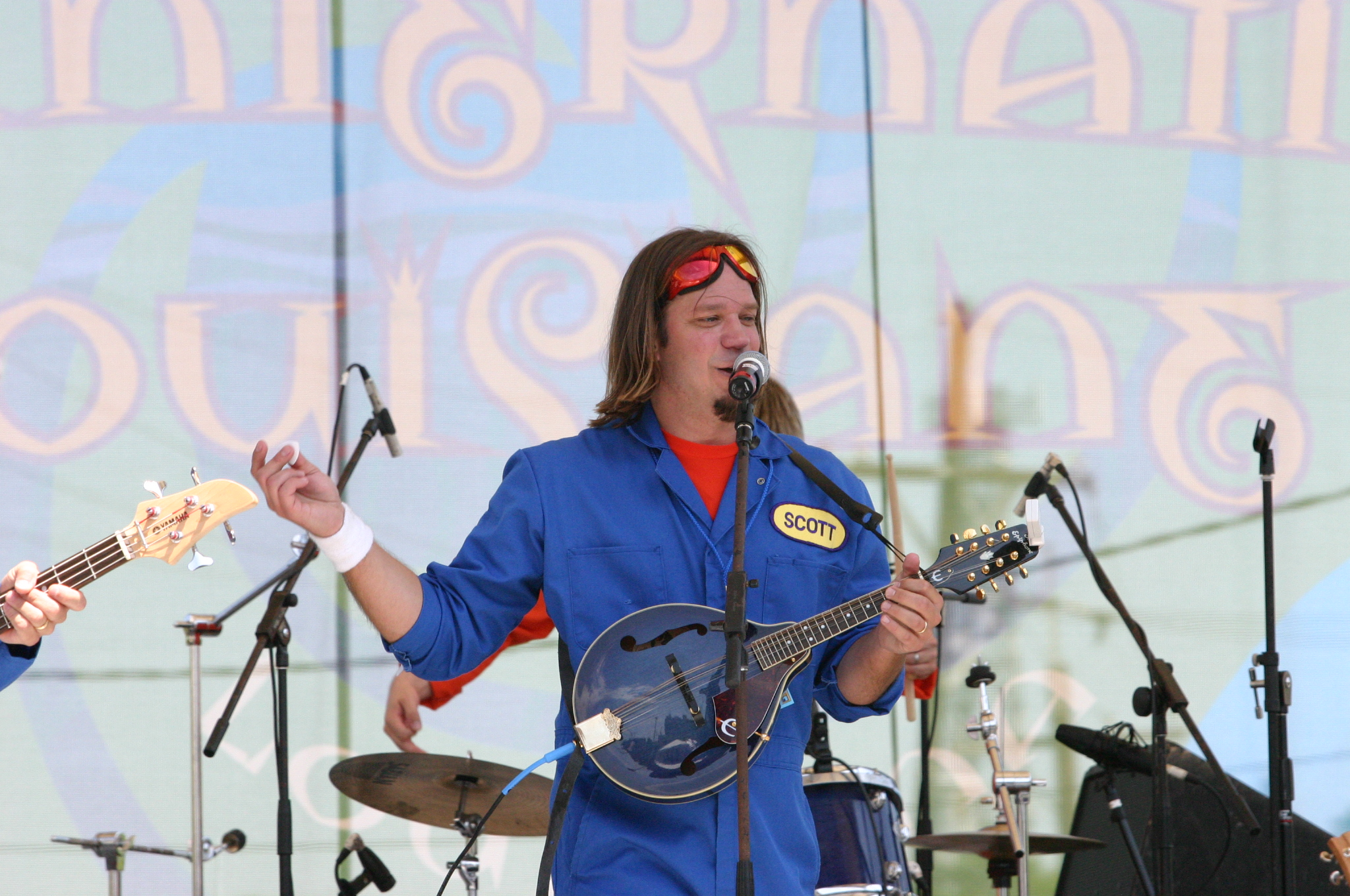
Scott Durbin in 2007

The initial inspiration for Imagination Movers came from Durbin in 2002, who wanted to create a local live action children's show that presented strong male role models for them. Durbin was inspired by the likes of Captain Kangaroo and Fred Rogers as well as the musical stylings of The Police and De La Soul.

The son of a second-generation Methodist minister and chaplain in the US Army, Durbin spent most of his early childhood as an army brat, residing in various places around the world including Washington, D.C., San Antonio, and Thailand, before his family moved to New Orleans when he was around seven years old. He studied abroad in both high school and college, living in Japan and Denmark. He has since moved because of Hurricane Katrina. He currently lives in Lafayette.

Before the formation of the Movers, Durbin received his undergraduate degree in religious studies from Centenary College of Louisiana and his graduate teaching certification from the University of New Orleans. He taught for a total of ten years, which inspired him to form the Imagination Movers. The first six years were at Norco Elementary 4–6 in the St. Charles Parish Public School system where he was awarded Teacher of the Year from his school. Later, he joined the faculty at Isidore Newman School in Orleans Parish and again received recognition, receiving the New Teacher of the Year award his first year there. He is married and has two children.

In the Idea Warehouse, Durbin, who plays the mandolin, keyboards, and melodica on the show, also wears "Wobble Goggles", which allow him to see things from a variety of perspectives.

In 2018, Durbin suffered a subarachnoid hemorrhage while performing with the Movers in Virginia and spent a few days in ICU. He later recovered fully from it.

Durbin joined the faculty at the University of Louisiana at Lafayette as an instructor and coordinator of the Music Business Program in 2015. He is currently an Assistant Professor and received the Sue and Chuck Lein Endowed Professorship in Music Business in 2021. Additionally, in 2023, Scott received the "Rising Star Award", an award recognizing junior faculty members showing great promise in scholarship in their respective colleges. In 2024, Durbin received an Eminent Faculty Award from the University of Louisiana at Lafayette for Service Leadership. And recently, Durbin received tenured from the University of Louisiana at Lafayette and promoted to associate professor. As a result, Scott Durbin is often asked to moderate or participate on panels on the music business.

Durbin's son, Brewster Durbin, has also taken a musical path in life, releasing music under his own name and co-producing tracks for Imagination Movers. He also has opened for numerous Imagination Movers shows.

=== Dave Poche ===
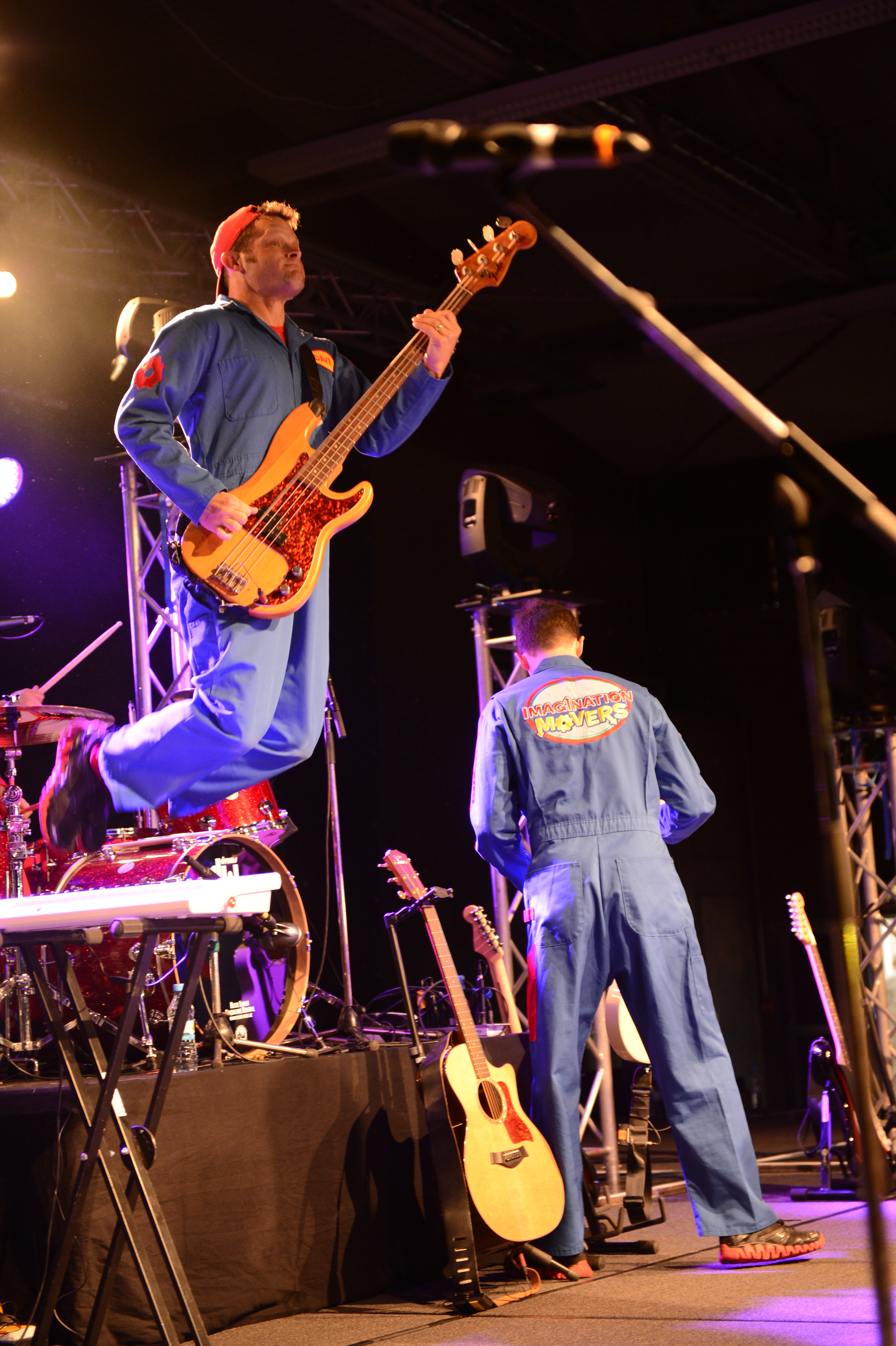
Dave Poche (left) in 2013

An architect by trade, Poche was part of the design team for the New Orleans Saints practice facilities and also designed various New Orleans–based banks, office buildings, and hotels. He also worked on several designs that are part of the post-Katrina rebuild efforts.

As "Imagination Mover Dave," Poche is the Movers' "jack-of-all-trades", using his red gadget hat as a storage device for a variety of objects, many of which he uses to make his gizmos and contraptions. Poche is also responsible for creating the concept of the Warehouse Mouse puppet, a mainstay in the series.

An active father, he has taken time from his busy schedule to serve as a Cub Scout den Akela as well as a coach for his children's T-ball, basketball, and soccer teams.

While he has no formal theatrical or musical training, Poche did fiddle with the bass briefly in college and has a colorful performance background that includes a stint as a stand-up comic. Like his fellow Movers, he is inspired by 1980s and '90s rock, pop and alternative music and by his front-lines experience dealing with issues his children experienced.

Originally from Baton Rouge, Poche received his degree from Louisiana State University and moved to his wife's hometown of New Orleans. Despite their home being destroyed in Hurricane Katrina, the couple returned to the New Orleans area where they currently reside with their children.

=== Scott "Smitty" Smith ===
Smitty, a District Chief in the New Orleans Fire Department, was part of the Hurricane Katrina search-and-rescue effort. While he was the only Mover not to have his home damaged in the storm, his firehouse was destroyed.

Guitarist for the Movers, Smith is the outdoorsman of the group; growing up in Southern Louisiana, he hunted and fished every weekend as a child, and continues to do so in his spare time. He enjoys exploring America's National Parks. Smith brings his outdoor experiences to the group by blowing duck and goose calls on some of the band's songs, including "I Heard That" and is a wooden duck carver.

An English Literature graduate of the University of New Orleans, Smith's given Mover prop is his trusty journal, which represents his Indiana Jones-like scholarly personality and is used as a resource when the Movers are trying to solve a problem.

A New Orleans native, Smith resides in New Orleans with his wife, Mary, their daughter, and three dogs.

=== Kyle Melancon ===
Kyle Melancon is a touring member of the Imagination Movers.

== Personnel ==
=== Official members ===
- Rich Collins – lead vocals, drums, guitar, bass
- Scott K Durbin – vocals, keyboards, mandolin, banjo
- Dave Poche – vocals, bass
- Scott "Smitty" Smith – vocals, guitar, bass

=== Touring members ===
- Kyle Melancon – drums, percussion, backing vocals
- Rex Collins - guitar

== Recognition ==
On March 22, 2008, the Imagination Movers were one of the entertainment groups to perform at the annual White House Easter Egg Roll on the White House South Lawn. Again in 2009, the Movers performed at the annual White House Easter Egg Roll for U.S. President Barack Obama.

On August 21, 2008, the Imagination Movers performed on Good Morning America.

The Imagination Movers won a 2009 Daytime Emmy Award for Outstanding Original Song in the category of Children's and Animation for their original song "Boing, Cluck, Cluck".

The Movers have been nominated twice for Daytime Emmy Awards in the category of Outstanding Original Song in 2009 and 2011.

In 2011, the Imagination Movers series received a WGA Award for Children's Episodic & Specials, for the season 2 episode "Happy Ha-Ha Holidays", written by that season's staff writers: Michael G. Stern, Randi Barnes, Rick Gitelson (who also developed the series), and Scott Gray.

According to Pollstar, the Movers ranked number 79 on the Top 100 tours North American tours of 2011. Due to their success as live performers, the Imagination Movers were also featured on the cover of Pollstar.

The Imagination Movers were National Buddy Walk Partners with the National Down Syndrome Society.

From the 2024-2025 Listeners' Choice Awards of The Parents' Pick Award-Winning Kids.Radio, the Imagination Movers were voted as Favorite Artist, Favorite Album, and Favorite Song.

== Discography ==
The band has released thirteen albums, one compilation album, two EPs, and multiple DVDs.

Rec Room Records

- Good Ideas (2003)
- Calling All Movers (2004)
- Stir It Up – DVD release (2004)
- Eight Feet (2005)
- Licensed to Move CD/DVD (2015)
- 10-4 (2018)

Disney Records

- Juice Box Heroes (2008)
- For Those About to Hop (2009)
- In a Big Warehouse (2010)
- Back In Blue (2013) – digital release only

Imagination Movers, LLC | Astronaut Walk Records

- Rock-O-Matic – CD/DVD (February 28, 2012)
- Happy to Be Here – EP (August 2023)
- Coveralls: Songs from the Imagination Movers (June 2023)
- Blue Skies (June 18, 2024)
- The Carryover Effect Mixtape (August 29, 2025)
- Christmas Mischief EP (December 5, 2025)

== Series ==
=== Episodes ===
Season	Episodes	Originally released		
Season	Episodes	First released	Last released	Network
1	26	September 6, 2008	August 15, 2009	Playhouse Disney
2	25	September 5, 2009	November 18, 2010	Playhouse Disney
3	24	February 14, 2011	April 14, 2013	Disney Junior
