= Mel Leavitt =

American historian and journalist

- Broadcast journalist
- Born: Mahlon Tirre Leavitt; June 13, 1927; St. Louis, Missouri, U.S.A.
- Died: August 8, 1997 (aged 70); New Orleans, Louisiana, U.S.A.
- Occupations: Television journalist, historian
- Years active: 1949-1997

Mel Leavitt (né Mahlon Tirre Leavitt) was a local historian and broadcast journalist that served the New Orleans, Louisiana, market from 1949 until near the time of his death in 1997 at age 70. His 35-year broadcast career was primarily at WDSU-TV, a New Orleans television station. He was the first broadcaster of U.S. Senate Hearings, specifically the Kefauver Hearings, for which he earned the Raytheon Award.

Leavitt was born in St. Louis, Missouri, and began his journalism career as a teenager at the St. Louis Globe-Democrat. After majoring in journalism at the University of Missouri in Columbia, he entered the US Army where he wrote for The Stars and Stripes. He subsequently began broadcasting for a AAA baseball farm team called the Newark Bears. These broadcasts led to a weekend radio show called The Inside of Sports for the Mutual Radio Network. From there, he was hired in 1949 by New Orleans businessman Edgar Stern to work for WDSU-TV, which had recently started broadcast operations.

Leavitt's productions earned two Peabody Awards and a Freedoms Foundation Award in 1981, as part of his Byline Mel Leavitt series. Leavitt's production The Ku Klux Klan was received an Emmy Award in 1965. His production The Huey Long Story earned a first prize from the American Association for State and Local History. Leavitt authored three books documenting significant people and events in the history of New Orleans. Additionally, he wrote forewords to cookbooks on New Orleans cuisine, most significantly one featuring the Creole cuisine of noted New Orleans restaurant The Court of Two Sisters.

Leavitt broadcast on other venues in New Orleans, including public broadcasting station WYES-TV, then ABC affiliate WVUE-TV, public broadcasting station WLAE-TV, and then independent station WGNO-TV, in addition to NBC affiliate WDSU-TV. His television series included 30 years as host of The Prep Quiz Bowl. At WGNO-TV, he produced and starred in a 30-minute television magazine show called Mel Leavitt's Magazine, which was subsequently known as Real New Orleans. He co-hosted a series of historical features at WLAE-TV focused on the history of the New Orleans area. Other Leavitt productions include a history-related quiz show called Do You Know Louisiana?, a late-night talk show Tonight with Mel, The Wonderful World of Cajuns, and The Battle that Missed the War.

Leavitt married fellow New Orleans broadcast journalist Naomi Bryant.

== Books ==
- Mel Leavitt, A Short History of New Orleans, Lexikos Publishing, 1982, ISBN 0-938530-03-8.
- Mel Leavitt, Great Characters of New Orleans, Lexikos Publishing, 1984, ISBN 0-938530-31-3.
- Mel Leavitt, New Orleans, America's International City: A Contemporary Portrait, Windsor Publications, 1990, ISBN 0-89781-425-8.
