= Spaceflight (TV series) =

- Written by: Blaine Baggett
- Directed by: Blaine Baggett
- Narrated by: Martin Sheen
- Country of origin: United States
- Original language: English

Production
- Producer: Blaine Baggett
- Editor: Kris Shacklette
- Running time: 1987

Original release
- Network: PBS
- Release: 1985

Spaceflight is a 1985 American documentary miniseries about crewed spaceflight, originally broadcast by PBS in four parts. It is narrated by Martin Sheen and features interviews with many former astronauts from the Mercury, Gemini, Apollo, and Space Shuttle programs. The series is a co-production of WETA-TV and WYES-TV. The final episode (Part 4) was redone after the Space Shuttle Challenger disaster (the revision covered the inquiry and the return to flight as well).

== Episodes ==
- Thunder in the Skies
- The Wings of Mercury
- One Giant Leap
- The Territory Ahead
