= Fredrick Barton =

American novelist and film critic

Fredrick Barton (aka, Rick Barton) is an American novelist and well-known New Orleans film critic. He is the author of five novels: The El Cholo Feeling Passes, Courting Pandemonium, With Extreme Prejudice (reissued as Black and White on the Rocks), A House Divided and In the Wake of the Flagship. He has also published a book of essays on “faith, love, politics and movies” titled Rowing to Sweden.

Barton holds a BA from Valparaiso University, an M.A. from UCLA, an MFA from the University of Iowa, and an honorary Ph.D. from Valparaiso University. He was the founding director of the MFA program in Creative Writing at the University of New Orleans, where he also served as Dean of Liberal Arts and Provost and Vice Chancellor for Academic Affairs and now serves as Writer in Residence. Barton lives in New Orleans.

== Themes ==
A theme throughout Barton’s work is the exploration of social justice through stories of love and friendship, often set at pivotal points in history. A House Divided is a murder mystery centering on an interracial friendship in the civil rights era. The El Cholo Feeling Passes is a love story playing out through the Women’s Movement and the Vietnam War. Black and White on the Rocks (previously released as With Extreme Prejudice) deals with racial prejudice and corruption in New Orleans. Set in the 1970s against the backdrop of Title IX ruling, in Courting Pandemonium a basketball coach is put through the wringer by radical feminists and evangelical Christians alike when he encourages a female star athlete to join the boys' team. The main character from The El Cholo Feeling Passes returns in Barton’s satirical In the Wake of the Flagship as an interim president of an underfunded public college recovering from hurricane devastation facing bureaucracy and corruption; though this novel is not set in New Orleans, Barton’s position as Provost and Vice Chancellor for Academic Affairs at the University of New Orleans during Hurricane Katrina and the university's recovery is well known.

== Awards ==
A House Divided, a novel based on the political assassinations of the 1960s, won the William Faulkner Prize for fiction in 2000. His other awards include a Louisiana Arts Prize; the Stephen T. Victory Award, the Louisiana State Bar Association’s prize for writing about legal issues; and the Award of Excellence from the Association of Religious Journals for his feature essay “Breaches of Faith” about New Orleans recovery efforts after Hurricane Katrina. He has also won the New Orleans Press Club's annual criticism prize eleven times and the Press Club highest honor, the Alex Waller Memorial Award.

== Bibliography ==
=== Fiction ===
- (1985) The El Cholo Feeling Passes
- (1986) Courting Pandemonium
- (2004) A House Divided
- (2013) Black and White on the Rocks (previously published as With Extreme Prejudice)
- (2015) In the Wake of the Flagship

=== Nonfiction ===
- (2010) Rowing to Sweden: Essays on Faith, Love, Politics and Movies

=== Film Review Series ===
==== Televised ====
- (1982–85) WDSU
- (1986-2010) WYES-TV series "Stepping Out"

==== Print Column ====
- (1981-2008) Gambit (newspaper)
