= Charles Zewe =

Charles Fredrick Zewe II is a former anchor for CNN Headline News in the 1990s, and also a correspondent for the CNN Southwest Bureau in Dallas.

== Biography ==
Zewe received his bachelor's degree from Louisiana State University, his master's degree from Loyola University New Orleans, and his Ph.D. from LSU. Zewe had his start in the New Orleans market, first reporting for The States-Item newspaper and then anchoring and executive-producing for stations WWL-TV (1971–1976) and WDSU-TV (1976–78/1981–87), as well as Public Affairs Director and anchor of the daily public affairs program Journal at WYES-TV (1978–80). He also was LSU System Vice President for Communications and External Affairs from 2005 to 2013, serving as the chief spokesman for the seven-campus Louisiana State University System.

He is married to Gayle (née Traina) Zewe; they have two sons, Charles F. Zewe III and Scott C. Zewe.
