= WYES-TV =

Television station in New Orleans

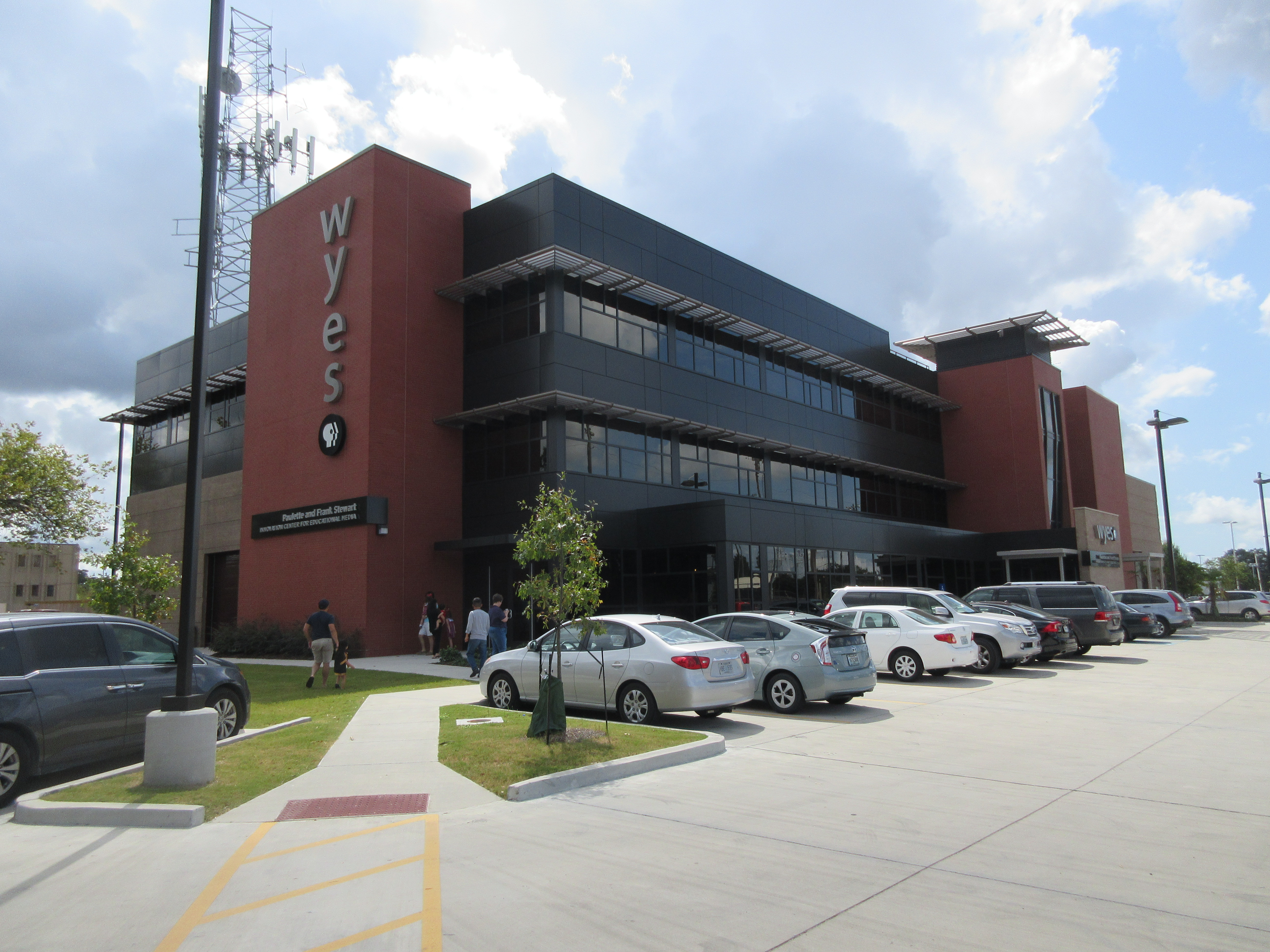
- WYES-TV's Navarre Avenue studios are officially named the Paulette and Frank Stewart Innovation Center for Educational Media.
- New Orleans, Louisiana; United States
- Channels: Digital: 28 (UHF); Virtual: 12
- Branding: WYES PBS

Programming
- Affiliations: 12.1: PBS; for others, see § Subchannels

Ownership
- Owner: Greater New Orleans Educational Television Foundation

History
- First air date: April 1, 1957
- Former call signs: WYES (1957)
- Former channel numbers: Analog: 8 (VHF, 1957–1970), 12 (VHF, 1970–2009); Digital: 11 (VHF, 2004–2024)
- Former affiliations: NET (1957–1970); Silent (August–December 2005)
- Call sign meaning: The word "yes"; -or-; "We're Your Education Station"

Technical information
- Licensing authority: FCC
- Facility ID: 25090
- ERP: 1,000 kW
- HAAT: 306 m (1,004 ft)
- Transmitter coordinates: 29°57′14″N 89°56′58″W

Links
- Public license information: Public file; LMS
- Website: www.wyes.org

WYES-TV (channel 12) is a PBS member television station in New Orleans, Louisiana, United States, owned by the Greater New Orleans Educational Television Foundation. The station's studios are located at the Paulette and Frank Stewart Innovation Center for Educational Media on Navarre Avenue in the city's Navarre neighborhood, and its transmitter is located on Magistrate Street in Chalmette.

WYES-TV is the only independently owned public television station in Louisiana as it is not part of Louisiana Public Broadcasting (LPB), which owns all of the PBS member stations in the state that are located outside of New Orleans, and maintains a programming agreement with and partial ownership of the city's independent public television station, WLAE-TV (channel 32). WYES-TV is also available on cable providers in Biloxi and Gulfport, Mississippi, despite the presence of Mississippi Public Broadcasting (MPB) transmitter WMAH-TV. WYES-TV carries PBS and American Public Television (APT) distributed programs, as well as programs from other distributors. Many national programs produced by WYES-TV are distributed by APT.

== History ==
WYES-TV traces its history to 1953, when a group of civic leaders led by Marion Abramson formed the Greater New Orleans Educational Television Association. The Federal Communications Commission (FCC) had assigned the VHF channel 8 allocation in the New Orleans market for non-commercial use, and the group quickly snapped up the license.

After numerous fits and starts, the station first signed on the air on April 1, 1957, on VHF channel 8. It was the 12th educational television station to sign on in the United States and the second in Louisiana as well as New Orleans' third television station (behind WDSU and WVUE, but before WWL-TV and WGNO). The state's first educational station, KLSE signed on a month earlier from Monroe, but went off the air in 1964, making WYES the oldest continuously operating educational station in Louisiana. After KLSE shut down, WYES would be the only educational station in the state until LPB flagship WLPB-TV in Baton Rouge signed on in September 1975. It originally operated as a member of National Educational Television (NET); the station joined the Public Broadcasting Service (PBS), when NET was reorganized in 1970.

On June 8, 1970, at 8 p.m., the station swapped channel positions with then-ABC affiliate WVUE and moved to channel 12, where the station remains today as its virtual channel. This was done in order for WVUE to be able to have a stronger broadcast signal which did not interfere with Jackson, Mississippi CBS affiliate WJTV, which also broadcasts on channel 12.

On July 8, 1984, WLAE-TV signed on as a secondary PBS member station for the market. It was owned by a partnership of the Willwoods Community and LPB; the latter bought a stake in order to get its Louisiana-focused programming into New Orleans. Through PBS' Program Differentiation Plan, WLAE carried only 25% of the programming broadcast by PBS, with channel 12 carrying the remainder of the network's programs. WYES became one of the earliest TV stations in the United States (and the first in New Orleans) to broadcast in stereo, doing so in May 1985. WYES became the market's exclusive PBS member once again on August 1, 2013, when WLAE ended its membership with the network to increase its focus on its locally produced programming. Among the PBS shows that WLAE had carried prior to leaving PBS were Sesame Street, which it shared with WYES, and the PBS NewsHour, whose removal from channel 32 resulted in the news program only being available in the market through WYES-TV's World subchannel on digital channel 12.2 until it was added to that station's primary channel the following month on September 2; the program had aired on WLAE under a longstanding arrangement with WYES.

WYES-TV's previous logo, used from 1980 to 2001.

Alternate version of WYES-TV's logo, used from 2001 to 2008.

=== Hurricane Katrina ===
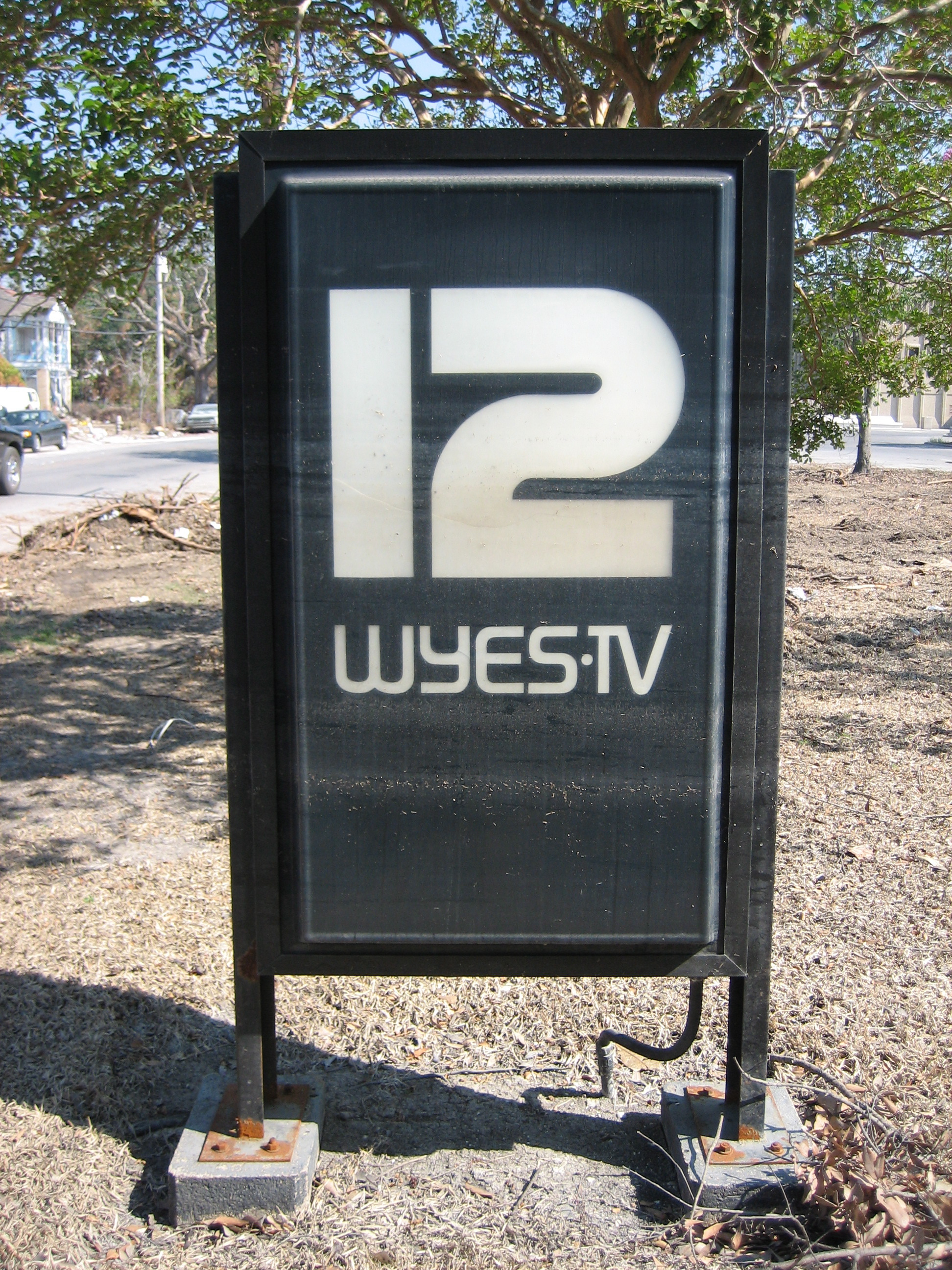
Sign in front of WYES' New Orleans studio building, with visible high water lines from Katrina's earlier flooding.

Due to massive flooding caused by the levee failures that occurred during Hurricane Katrina's landfall on August 29, 2005, WYES' Navarre Avenue studios, where the station had been based for nearly its entire existence, sustained severe damage from flood waters of up to five feet (1.5 m). The Navarre neighborhood is located in a low-lying area that sustained particularly severe damage due to flooding. The station's transmitters were spared serious damage, but the storm damaged a backup generator that provided emergency power to the transmitter facility, keeping the station off the air for almost four months.

Following Katrina, WYES partnered with local cable providers including Cox Communications and Charter Communications to pipe in LPB's signal starting in November 2005. WYES restored its broadcast signal on December 30, operating from a temporary facility located on Veterans Boulevard and Phosphor Avenue in Metairie. It would take almost six years for WYES to return to New Orleans itself.

In May 2011, WYES began construction of a new 20,000-square-foot (1,900 m^{2}) broadcast facility located behind the original building that cost $7 million to build. Funding for its construction came from multiple sources, including funds raised during since-aborted plans for an unrelated facility, to have been known as the "Teleplex", that was planned to be built in the 1990s on the campus of the University of New Orleans. The facility was constructed in two phases: with a building that houses the station's technical equipment being built first, followed by another complex that would replace the original facility, which would house other operations. The station moved its fundraising operations back to the original Navarre Avenue facility in 2012, with the rest of the station's operations following suit later that year.

== Original programming ==
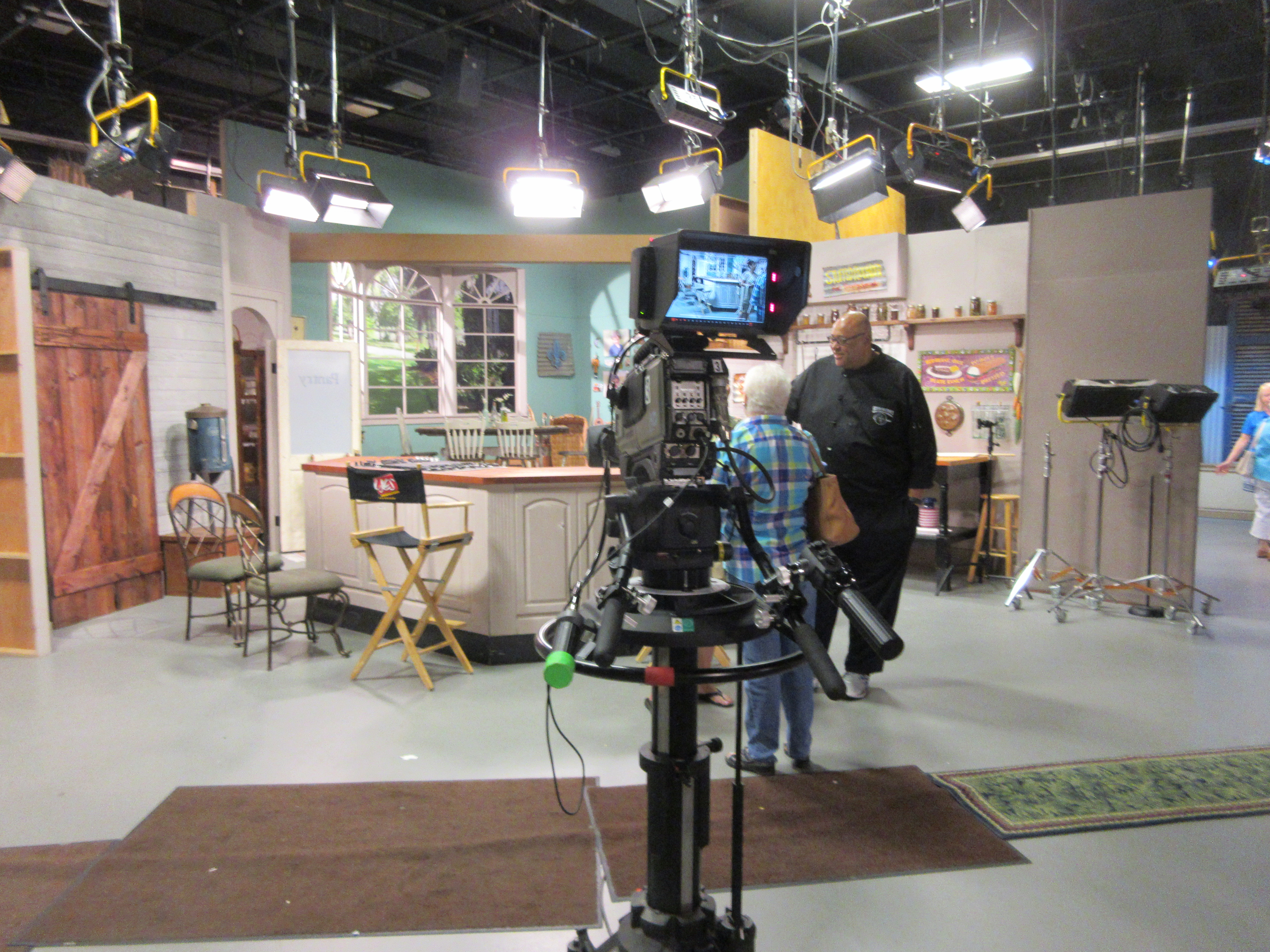
The set of Kevin Belton's New Orleans Kitchen.

WYES is best known outside of New Orleans as the home of the famous Louisiana chef and storyteller Justin Wilson, whose show originated from WYES-TV's studios. It is also known as the home for another famous Louisiana chef, Paul Prudhomme. WYES has been the originator of nationally syndicated cooking shows hosted by Kevin Belton, as well as Kitchen Queens: New Orleans, a series dedicated to the pioneering chef Leah Chase that spotlights women chefs at their New Orleans area restaurants.

In 1984, WYES premiered Informed Sources, a program devoted to in-depth discussion of the news by local journalists; it is still running today. Informed Sources was inspired by a former WYES show entitled City Desk, which ran from 1971 to 1978.

The 1985 documentary miniseries Spaceflight was co-produced by WYES. The Steven Banks Show, a short-lived PBS sitcom, was filmed at the WYES studios in 1994.

Since 1997 during Mardi Gras, WYES has televised coverage of the Rex ball hosted by Peggy Scott Laborde and Errol Laborde, including the "Meeting of the Courts" with the Mistick Krewe of Comus—an event considered the symbolic end of Carnival season.

== Notable people ==
- Fredrick Barton – film critic
- Mel Leavitt – journalist
- Paul Prudhomme – host
- Andrea Roane – news anchor
- Al Shea – theatre critic
- Justin Wilson – host

== Technical information ==
=== Subchannels ===
The station's signal is multiplexed:

Subchannels of WYES-TV
Subchannel	Res.	Short name	Programming
12.1	720p	WYES-HD	PBS
12.2	480i	WYESSD1	World
12.3	480i	WYESSD2	Create
12.4	480i	WYESSD3	PBS Kids
32.1	720p	WLAE HD	WLAE-TV (Edu. Ind.)
32.2	480i	Encore	WLAE Encore
32.3	480i	C TV	CatholicTV

Broadcast on behalf of another station

=== Analog-to-digital conversion ===
WYES-TV shut down its analog signal, over VHF channel 12, at 7 a.m. on June 12, 2009, the official date on which full-power television stations in the United States transitioned from analog to digital broadcasts under federal mandate. The station's digital signal continued to broadcasts on its pre-transition VHF channel 11, using virtual channel 12.
