= Joe Zewe =

American soccer player (born 1983)

Personal information
- Full name: Joseph Zewe
- Date of birth: June 22, 1983 (age 43)
- Place of birth: McKeesport, Pennsylvania, United States
- Height: 6 ft 1 in (1.85 m)
- Position: Forward

Youth career
- 2001–2004: Penn State Nittany Lions

Senior career*
Years	Team	Apps	(Gls)
2004	Reading Rage	13	(1)
2005–2006	Boldklubben 1909		
2006–2008	Viborg		
2008	Pittsburgh Riverhounds	7	(1)
2008–2009	Klaksvík		
2009	Pittsburgh Riverhounds	17	(0)
- * Club domestic league appearances and goals as of 11 October 2009

Joe Zewe (born June 22, 1983, in McKeesport, Pennsylvania) is an American soccer player, currently without a club.

== Career ==
=== Youth ===
Zewe grew up in the suburbs of Pittsburgh where he played for Pittsburgh Beadling. He also played collegiately for Penn State.

=== Professional ===
Zewe began his professional career in 2005 with B 1909 of the Danish 2nd Division. He left the team in May 2006, with three games remaining in the season, having scored 12 goals in all competitions.

In July 2006, Zewe signed a contract with Viborg FF of the Danish Superliga, and played for the team for 2 years before returning to the United States in 2008. Zewe played several games for his hometown Pittsburgh Riverhounds in the USL Second Division in 2008, but left due to mutual consent and in July 2008, and subsequently signed a contract with KÍ Klaksvík of the Faroe Islands Premier League Football.

Zewe returned to Pittsburgh in 2009.
