= WLAE-TV =

Television station in New Orleans

ATSC 3.0 station
- New Orleans, Louisiana; United States
- Channels: Digital: 23 (UHF); Virtual: 32
- Branding: WLAE

Programming
- Affiliations: 32.1: Educational Independent; 32.2: WLAE Encore; 32.3: CatholicTV

Ownership
- Owner: Willwoods Community (50%); Louisiana Educational Television Authority (50%); (Educational Broadcasting Foundation, Inc.)

History
- First air date: July 8, 1984
- Former channel numbers: Analog: 32 (UHF, 1984–2009); Digital: 31 (UHF, until 2019)
- Former affiliations: PBS (1984–2013)
- Call sign meaning: Louisiana Educational Television

Technical information
- Licensing authority: FCC
- Facility ID: 18819
- ERP: 168 kW
- HAAT: 274 m (899 ft)
- Transmitter coordinates: 29°58′58″N 89°57′9″W

Links
- Public license information: Public file; LMS
- Website: www.wlae.com

WLAE-TV (channel 32) is an educational independent television station in New Orleans, Louisiana, United States. The station is owned by the Educational Broadcasting Foundation, a partnership between the Willwoods Community (a Catholic organization) and the Louisiana Educational Television Authority (operator of Louisiana Public Broadcasting, the public broadcaster for Louisiana outside of New Orleans). WLAE's studios are located on 6th Street in the New Orleans suburb of Metairie, and its transmitter is located northeast of Chalmette.

Channel 32 was built by the Archdiocese of New Orleans and began broadcasting on July 8, 1984. It offered educational programming for schools, in line with the vision held by then-archbishop Philip Hannan, and served as a secondary PBS station for New Orleans, producing a range of local-interest programs. In the early 1990s, the archdiocese opted to reinvest in its schools and sought a buyer for WLAE. After discussions with other local and regional public broadcasters failed to materialize, the Willwoods Community—whose owner was one of channel 32's trustees at the time—acquired the station in 1992. In turn, it sold a half-interest to the Louisiana Educational Television Authority in 1995. After Hurricane Katrina, WLAE was not able to broadcast on its own for more than a year, but it offered programming via cable.

In the wake of state budget cuts, WLAE disaffiliated from PBS in 2013 to refocus itself on local programming. The station broadcasts weekly and monthly programming on local issues, as well as documentaries and state programs from Louisiana Public Broadcasting and a daily Catholic Mass.

== History ==
=== Construction and archdiocesan ownership ===
In 1981, the Roman Catholic Archdiocese of New Orleans, led by archbishop Philip Hannan, began planning an expansion into television. An archdiocesan subsidiary, Educational Broadcasting Foundation, Inc., applied to the Federal Communications Commission (FCC) for authority to build a station on New Orleans's previously unused channel 32. The FCC granted the construction permit on October 15, 1981, but the construction of WLAE was slowed by the need for environmental permits at the selected transmitter site location. One of the primary uses of the new station would be to provide educational programming into its school system—which, in 1981, enrolled 62,000 students at 120 schools—as well as public and other private schools.

WLAE entered a market already served in some form by two public television stations. New Orleans already had a local public TV station, WYES-TV (channel 12), and cable systems in New Orleans offered Louisiana Public Broadcasting (LPB), the public TV broadcaster serving the remainder of the state. LPB contracted with WYES-TV to broadcast its educational programming into New Orleans–area schools, but the relationship between the two entities grew strained when WYES tried to have LPB removed from the New Orleans cable systems. This contract served as the primary source of state funding for WYES, so when WLAE became an option for LPB to consider, it put channel 12 at financial risk.

WLAE began broadcasting on July 8, 1984, from studios and offices at the Notre Dame Seminary. When it started, it was the only PBS station in the country built and operated by a church. Its programming consisted of re-airs of PBS programs, though the network's primary outlet in New Orleans remained WYES; independently purchased public TV programming; and local programming covering public affairs, the arts, and Catholicism, though it also aired programming from other religious denominations. Its first live outside broadcast was the closing of the 1984 World's Fair, which took place in November. For the 1986–1987 school year, WLAE-TV took over the contract to carry LPB educational programming, serving more than 348,000 students; it lost the contract after one school year because its signal was not on cable in Assumption Parish, nor did its signal reach all parts of the parish. To replace the lost state-provided programs, the station produced its own educational lineup instead of airing PBS shows during the day. Instructional programming moved back to WLAE after one school year, when the archdiocese offered to pay the state to air it instead of the state paying WYES.

Under founding director Jerry Romig, WLAE sought to fill what he perceived as a void in New Orleans programming. While WYES-TV produced its own programs, these often were designed for national distribution, whereas WLAE programming was intended for a more local audience. In 1987, a WLAE documentary, The St. Charles Streetcar: Our Oldest Line, received an Iris Award from the National Association of Television Program Executives. When Pope John Paul II visited New Orleans in 1987, WLAE coordinated WYES and the three local commercial stations—WWL-TV, WDSU, and WVUE—in the television press pool. After the pope's visit, the station initiated a round of cutbacks spurred by weaker than expected public support. As a result, one of its most visible program producers, Peggy Laborde, departed WLAE; she moved to WYES, bringing the arts magazine Steppin' Out with her to channel 12.

Laborde, who had served as general manager, was replaced by John Curren, who had little background in public television but had run a New Orleans TV station: WNOL-TV (channel 38). Mark Lorando of The Times-Picayune interpreted the Curren hiring as indicating a strong desire for fundraising and sales experience. Under Curren, the station initiated weekly coverage of the Sunday Mass from St. Louis Cathedral.

In 1988, Hannan retired as archbishop of New Orleans but continued to be highly active in station affairs. His successor as archbishop, Francis B. Schulte, named him president of WLAE-TV, a role in which he raised funds and planned programming. He also hosted Focus, a newsmagazine, and traveled the world as a reporter for the program. Hannan's star power helped attract donations that reversed WLAE's previous financial deficits.

=== Sale to Willwoods ===
By the early 1990s, the Archdiocese of New Orleans found that it was no longer willing to fund long-term changes at WLAE-TV. Even though the station was self-supporting, the archdiocese had been recommended to implement changes to its school system that required additional costs, and the schools were found to be a higher priority. In 1991, the archdiocese held talks with the University of New Orleans and WYES-TV about buying WLAE-TV. LPB also negotiated to buy the station, which raised the specter of its employees losing their jobs in a centralization with the Baton Rouge–based state broadcaster. After more than a year of uncertainty, the Willwoods Community acquired the station from the archdiocese in 1992. Willwoods was a charitable organization founded by Paul Nalty, a lawyer who served on WLAE-TV's board of trustees. In a deal agreed in 1994 and finalized in 1995, Willwoods sold a half-interest in the Educational Broadcasting Foundation, owner of WLAE, to the Louisiana Educational Television Authority.

Under Willwoods, WLAE began on-air pledge drives for the first time since 1988. The station also narrowed its content focus. In 1997, the station signed on with the daily Catholic Mass, and then aired 10 hours of children's programming during the day and informational programming, including local shows, in the evening, plus overnight college telecourses. Focus continued to air, with Hannan doing less international reportage than previously.

In 2002, WLAE, WYES, and WWNO, the University of New Orleans (UNO)–owned public radio station, agreed to pool resources to build a common studio facility, dubbed a "teleplex", on a UNO campus at a cost of $19 million. The project, which had been discussed since the early 1990s, was also seen as enabling the television stations to begin broadcasting digital signals. The project received approval from the Louisiana State University System in August 2004, but the stations were still planning a capital campaign to raise funds by the time Hurricane Katrina hit New Orleans in August 2005. The storm destroyed a newly installed transmitter and caused water damage to WLAE's studios on Causeway Boulevard in Metairie. Conversely, WYES's studios were inundated with 5 feet (1.5 m) of water. WLAE's studios remained usable, and by the end of 2005, the station was feeding nightly public affairs programming to cable customers in New Orleans, who received LPB in the interim, and north of Lake Pontchartrain. WYES's Steppin' Out and Informed Sources returned to production in January 2006 using WLAE's studios. WLAE produced its own series covering the post-Katrina recovery, A Greater New Orleans: The Road to Recovery. The money given to WYES and WLAE originally for the teleplex was used to construct new master control facilities at each station; WLAE did not broadcast over-the-air for 18 months.

=== Disaffiliation from PBS ===
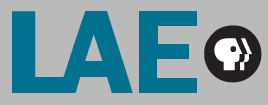
WLAE's last logo as a PBS station, used from c. 2006 to August 1, 2013

WLAE-TV operated as a secondary member of the network through PBS's Program Differentiation Plan and thus only carried 25% of the programming broadcast by PBS, while the remainder aired on WYES. Sesame Street was one of the few programs that was shown on both stations. In 2010, when WLAE faced a $270,000 budget cut, the station began contemplating disaffiliating from PBS to focus on local programming. It dropped PBS programming on August 1, 2013, with WYES becoming the only PBS station serving New Orleans. The PBS NewsHour was not available from the main channel of WYES for a month following the switch; prior to 2013, WLAE had aired it at 6 p.m. and on a subchannel of WYES at 9 p.m. WYES and WLAE explored a merger in 2020, but talks were abandoned.

In 2024, the Willwoods Community and WLAE-TV moved from a site on Howard Avenue in New Orleans into new facilities on 6th Street in Metairie.

== Funding ==
In fiscal year 2024, WLAE had total revenue of $1.599 million. $500,000 of this came from the Corporation for Public Broadcasting, including a $470,000 Community Service Grant. Foundations and nonprofit associations contributed $305,690, mostly in underwriting costs, and individuals donated another $189,000 in underwriting. The station had 211 members who donated $30,155 in the fiscal year.

== Local programming ==
WLAE concentrates on the production of local programming with multiple weekly and monthly series of local interest, including Inside New Orleans Sports; Affordable Housing Matters, hosted by former TV reporter Norman Robinson; NOLA Crime Crisis; and Faith & Marriage Today. It also produces documentaries on topics of local interest.

WLAE televises a daily Catholic Mass, presented live from the St. Louis Cathedral in the city's Jackson Square district. The telecast of the Daily Mass had been an issue with PBS in 2009. When the network's board re-interpreted its bylaws, it threatened to enforce existing provisions that programming be nonsectarian, but it opted to grandfather existing programs, including the Daily Mass, into this rule.

In addition to New Orleans programming, many LPB programs air in the New Orleans area on WLAE-TV.

== Technical information ==
Subchannels provided by WLAE-TV on the WYES-TV multiplex (ATSC 1.0)
Subchannel	Res.	Short name	Programming	ATSC 1.0 host
32.1	720p	WLAE HD	Main WLAE-TV programming	WYES-TV
32.2	480i	Encore	WLAE Encore	WYES-TV
32.3	480i	C TV	CatholicTV	WYES-TV

Subchannels of WLAE-TV (ATSC 3.0)
Subchannel	Res.	Short name	Programming
12.1	1080p	WYES-NG	PBS (WYES-TV)
32.1	1080p	WLAE-HD	Main WLAE-TV programming

WLAE-TV shut down its analog signal, over UHF channel 32, by early February 2009. The station's digital signal continued to broadcast on its pre-transition UHF channel 31, using virtual channel 32. On October 19, 2019, WLAE relocated its signal to channel 23 as a result of the 2016 United States wireless spectrum auction.

WLAE-TV had planned to convert to ATSC 3.0 operation in November 2024, with the station hosting WYES-TV's ATSC 3.0 feed and WYES broadcasting WLAE's 1.0 subchannels; however, this was delayed due to an emergency involving WLAE's engineer. The station requested special temporary authority to remain silent. WLAE activated its ATSC 3.0 signal on January 10, 2025, broadcasting from its transmitter northeast of Chalmette.

== See also ==
- Catholic television
