= Disney Jr. (programming block) =

American children's programming block

- Current logo used since June 1, 2024
- Network: Disney Channel
- Launched: April 6, 1997; 29 years ago
- Country of origin: United States
- Owner: Disney Entertainment Television (The Walt Disney Company)
- Headquarters: Burbank, California
- Formerly known as: Disney Channel Little Kids (1997–1999); Playhouse Disney (1999–2011); Disney Junior on Disney Channel (2011–2017)
- Original languages: English; Spanish (via SAP audio track)
- Official website: www.disneynow.com

Disney Jr., formerly Playhouse Disney and Disney Junior, is an American preschool programming block on Disney Channel. Aimed mainly at children aged two to six years old, its programming features a mix of live-action and animated series.

The block was rebranded as "Disney Junior on Disney Channel" on February 14, 2011, with the international programming blocks and television channels featuring the Playhouse Disney brand rebranding to Disney Junior later that year. The block later launched the "Mickey Mornings" sub-block in 2020.

== History ==
Logo used from February 1, 1999 to September 29, 2002

=== Playhouse Disney ===
==== Early years (1997–2002) ====
Before Playhouse Disney's launch, Disney Channel had aired a lineup of preschool-targeted programs to compete with Nick Jr. (which were mixed alongside animated series aimed at older children) during the morning hours since the channel's launch on April 18, 1983.

On April 6, 1997, Disney Channel underwent a relaunch that signified the beginning of its full conversion into a commercial-free basic cable channel, and its preschool block now utilized a similar graphics package for its promotions as that used for the channel's afternoon children's programs. After Disney Channel's preschool block premiered three new original series in 1998 (PB&J Otter, Rolie Polie Olie, and Out of the Box), the block rebranded as Playhouse Disney on February 1, 1999.

One of Playhouse Disney's most popular series was Bear in the Big Blue House, which debuted on October 20, 1997; the series was named by TV Guide as one of the "top 10 new shows for kids" that year. For the first three years of its run, the Playhouse Disney block originally aired each weekday from 8:30 a.m. to 2:30 p.m. Eastern Time, and weekends from 6:00 to 10:00 a.m. Eastern Time. Following each program, which usually ran 23 minutes (most of which, except for films, aired without promotional interruption), the remainder of the time period was filled by either short segments and music videos (the latter of which were originally aired under the banner "Feet Beat") or an episode of an acquired short series.

On April 16, 2001, Playhouse Disney introduced a new on-air graphics package produced by motion graphics company Beehive; actress Allyce Beasley began serving as the U.S. block's promo announcer at this time, a capacity she would hold until March 30, 2007. Radio Disney cross-promoted the block by rebranding its "Mickey and Minnie's Tune Time" block as "Playhouse Disney", and in 2002, the block's "Feet Beat" interstitials were renamed "BB's Music Time" to promote the Radio Disney block. On June 25, 2001, Disney-ABC Cable Networks Group (now Disney-ABC Television Group) announced plans to launch Playhouse Disney Channel, a companion digital cable and satellite channel that would have served the same target audience as the Disney Channel block; plans for the network were eventually canceled, although Disney-ABC International Television would launch dedicated Playhouse Disney channels and blocks in international markets (including Canada, Afro-Eurasia and Latin America) between 2002 and 2007. The Walt Disney Company acquired the broadcast rights to The Wiggles as part of their purchase of the Fox Family Channel in 2001; The Wiggles moved to Playhouse Disney in June 2002 and became one of the block's most watched shows during its run.

==== Marketing expansion (2002–2011) ====
Like Disney Channel, Playhouse Disney was a commercial-free service, but it did show short "promotional spots" (structured as short-form segments for Disney products targeted at the block's demographics) alongside underwriter sponsorships (with companies such as McDonald's) within breaks between programs beginning in 2002 (preschool-targeted programs that aired between 3:00 and 7:00 a.m. Central Time outside of the Playhouse Disney banner, included the promotional shorts for Disney entertainment products that were seen during Disney Channel's afternoon and nighttime schedule). On September 30, 2002, Playhouse Disney changed its logo to reflect Disney Channel's on-air rebranding. The block also removed most of its older interstitial material and introduced a mascot that month named Clay (voiced by Debi Derryberry), an anthropomorphic clay figure who often used the catchphrases "It's true!" and "Are you with me?".

On March 31, 2007, Ooh and Aah, two puppet monkeys (who served as the main characters for one of the short series featured on the Playhouse Disney lineup, Ooh, Aah & You) became the official hosts of the block, replacing Clay. Every summer starting in 2007, Playhouse Disney's end time was truncated to four hours on weekdays (from 6:00 to 10:00 a.m. Eastern Time). Episodes from Disney Channel's original series were aired during the late morning and early afternoon. However, the weekend schedule continued to air for seven hours. By this point, the Playhouse Disney block had expanded to air from 4:00 a.m. to 2:00 p.m. Eastern Time on weekdays, and 4:00 to 9:00 a.m. Eastern Time on weekends, each running a different schedule.

=== Disney Junior/Disney Jr. (2011–present) ===
On May 26, 2010, Disney-ABC Television Group announced the relaunch of Playhouse Disney as Disney Junior, which would serve as the brand for the Disney Channel block and a new standalone digital cable and satellite channel in the United States, as well as the new brand for the existing Playhouse Disney-branded cable channels and program blocks outside the US. The Playhouse Disney block ended its 14-year run on February 13, 2011, with the last program to air being an episode of the short series Handy Manny's School for Tools at 8:55 a.m. Eastern Time.

The Disney Junior block debuted on February 14, 2011. Several former Playhouse Disney series continued to air the relaunched block including Mickey Mouse Clubhouse, Special Agent Oso, Imagination Movers, Handy Manny, and Little Einsteins. With the relaunch of the block, the block's mascots Ooh and Aah and several of its older programs were removed (however, Ooh and Aah & You briefly returned on the Disney Junior website as a part of the Fan Favorites week of July 18, 2011, and was also later carried in reruns on the Disney Junior television channel. Additionally, its episodes are available on Disney Junior's YouTube channel as of January 6, 2011).

The 24-hour Disney Junior cable channel launched on March 23, 2012, mainly featuring a mix of original series and programs from the Playhouse Disney library (which largely aired as part of the channel's overnight schedule until mid-2014, when most of the Playhouse Disney shows were removed from the schedule completely after airing their series finales). Disney Junior replaced the channel space held by the Disney-owned soap opera-focused channel Soapnet on some cable providers, largely due to that channel's declining subscriber reach (being carried in 75 million households with pay television at the time of Disney Junior's launch). An automated Soapnet feed remained in operation for providers that did not yet reach agreements to carry the Disney Junior channel or providers that were required to continue carrying Soapnet in addition to Disney Junior until Soapnet fully shut down on December 31, 2013, at 11:59 pm, with the last program to air being an episode of General Hospital.

== See also ==
- Nick Jr. – a similar programing brand that originated as a program block on Nickelodeon in 1988 and a channel since 2009.
- Sprout – a defunct preschool-targeted digital cable and satellite network. It was rebranded as a youth audience channel, Universal Kids, in 2017, which was closed in March 2025.
- Cartoonito – a similar programing brand on Cartoon Network since 2006 in the UK and 2021 in America.
