= List of Night Court episodes =

The following is a list of episodes for the American television sitcom Night Court. The series originally aired on NBC from January 4, 1984 to May 31, 1992, with a total of 193 episodes produced, spanning nine seasons.

== Series overview ==
Season	Episodes	Originally released		Rank	Rating
Season	Episodes	First released	Last released	Rank	Rating
1	13	January 4, 1984	May 31, 1984	47	15.5
2	22	September 27, 1984	May 9, 1985	20	17.6
3	22	September 26, 1985	May 8, 1986	11	20.9
4	22	October 2, 1986	May 6, 1987	7	23.2
5	22	September 17, 1987	May 12, 1988	7	20.8
6	22	October 26, 1988	May 3, 1989	21	16.9
7	24	September 27, 1989	May 2, 1990	28	14.5 (Note: Tied with The Simpsons and Doogie Howser, M.D..)
8	24	September 28, 1990	May 8, 1991	50	11.5
9	22	September 18, 1991	May 31, 1992	46	12.0

== Episodes ==
=== Season 1 (1984) ===
No. overall	No. in season	Title	Directed by	Written by	Original release date	Prod. code	Rating/share (households)
1	1	"All You Need Is Love"	James Burrows	Reinhold Weege	January 4, 1984	206719	16.9/25
Harold T. Stone (Harry Anderson) becomes a night court judge in New York City. Working with him are court clerk Lana Wagner (Karen Austin), prosecutor Dan Fielding (John Larroquette), public defender Sheila Gardner (Gail Strickland), and bailiffs Bull Shannon (Richard Moll) and Selma Hacker (Selma Diamond). In his first case, he has to settle a dispute involving a woman threatening her husband with gunfire while at the same time trying to earn the trust of his staff, who are skeptical about his unorthodox judicial methods. Note: This is Gail Strickland's only episode as a cast member.
2	2	"Santa Goes Downtown"	Asaad Kelada	Reinhold Weege	January 11, 1984	185365	16.1/24
The season is merry as Harry deals with a man in a red suit charged with trespassing (Jeff Corey) and tries to restore the faith of a pair of cynical teenage runaways (Michael J. Fox and Olivia Barash). Note: Paula Kelly makes her first appearance as public defender Liz Williams, replacing Gail Strickland from the pilot episode.
3	3	"The Former Harry Stone"	Jay Sandrich	Tom Reeder	January 18, 1984	185362	13.4/20
Lana learns Harry has a criminal record when she tries to find out his age to settle a bet. Note: Terry Kiser makes his first appearance as sleazy reporter Al Craven.
4	4	"Welcome Back, Momma"	Jeff Melman	Reinhold Weege	February 1, 1984	185366	16.1/24
A woman who claims to be Harry's long lost mother (Janis Paige) and a beauty pageant operator appear before the court.
5	5	"The Eye of the Beholder"	Jeff Melman	Larry Balmagia	February 8, 1984	185363	16.2/24
The others try to pull Bull out of the dumps when he's turned down by a charitable organization because his size and appearance are intimidating to others.
6	6	"Death Threat"	Jay Sandrich	Bob Stevens	February 15, 1984	185367	17.6/27
Things are thrown into an uproar when Harry receives a threat via a rock thrown through the window and a bomb is discovered in the courtroom. Note: Phil Leeds appears as a man claiming to be God. George Murdock appears as a homicide detective. Jack Murdock appears as a bomb defuser.
7	7	"Once in Love With Harry"	Jay Sandrich	Reinhold Weege	February 22, 1984	185361	14.0/22
A hooker develops a crush on Harry and Dan loses a city council position to a dead man. Note: Jason Bernard appears as a judge.
8	8	"Quadrangle of Love"	Jeff Melman	Story by : R.J. Colleary; Teleplay by : R.J. Colleary, Chris Cluess and Stuart Kreisman	February 29, 1984	185369	15.9/24
Dan, Harry, and Bull all compete for the same pretty attorney (Caroline McWilliams); Harry tries to get tickets to see Mel Tormé. Note: George D. Wallace appears as a doctor. The end credits have a different background for this episode. Instead of the court, they show Harry and his little homemade Mel Tormé concert.
9	9	"Wonder Drugs"	Asaad Kelada	Howard Ostroff	March 7, 1984	185364	14.3/22
Lana disrupts the proceedings after taking a powerful cold medicine. Note: Jack Riley appears as a clown. Ron Feinberg appears as a man in a dress. Sandy Martin appears as a woman in the gallery.
10	10	"Some Like It Hot"	Jay Sandrich	Stuart Kreisman & Chris Cluess	March 14, 1984	185368	15.4/24
Russian Yakov Korolenko (Yakov Smirnoff), who is charged with selling stolen property, would rather burn down the courtroom and everyone in it than go to jail. Note: This episode marks the first appearance of Mike Finneran as courthouse handyman Art Fensterman. It also marks Karen Austin's final appearance as court clerk Lana Wagner, though she is listed in the opening credits through the end of the season.
11	11	"Harry and the Rock Star"	Jay Sandrich	Reinhold Weege	March 21, 1984	185360	15.8/24
Fans and reporters disrupt court proceedings when Harry dates a rock star (Kristine DeBell), and tries to cope with a new court clerk. Note: This is the first episode to have the evil laugh as part of the Starry Night Productions logo.
12	12	"Bull's Baby"	Jeff Melman	Bob Stevens	March 28, 1984	185362	13.7/21
The courtroom crew try to help Bull when a neighbor leaves her baby with him. Note: D.D. Howard appears as court clerk Charley Tracy. Alex Henteloff appears as a defendant.
13	13	"Hi Honey, I'm Home"	Gary Shimokawa	Tom Reeder	May 31, 1984	185361	16.4/28
Harry has to settle the legal status of a woman (Marcia Rodd) who remarried after her first husband Mitch Bowers (Charles Napier) was mistakenly declared dead, and who wants her back even though she is now seeing another man (Basil Hoffman). Note: D.D. Howard appears as court clerk Charley Tracy. Milt Kogan appears as a doctor. Paula Kelly makes her final appearance as public defender Liz Williams.

=== Season 2 (1984–85) ===
No. overall	No. in season	Title	Directed by	Written by	Original release date	Prod. code	Rating/share (households)
14	1	"The Nun"	Jeff Melman	Bob Stevens	September 27, 1984	185602	18.3/28
An impressionable young nun (Dinah Manoff) decides to leave her order after meeting Harry; Dan tries to hit on a temporary public defender. Note: Charles Robinson makes his first appearance as court clerk Mac Robinson. The unnamed temporary public defender (played by Sharon Barr) is not seen again. Randee Heller appears as a prostitute. Earl Boen appears as her client. Lu Leonard appears as an older nun.
15	2	"Daddy for the Defense"	Jeff Melman	Reinhold Weege	October 4, 1984	185601	17.4/26
A new public defender has a rough first day in court, thanks to Harry and her over-protective father (Eugene Roche); Selma returns to work delirious after surgery. Note: This episode was originally intended to be the season premiere. Markie Post, in her first-ever appearance on the show, appears in a one-episode guest stint as new public defender Christine Sullivan. Shelley Hack was originally cast as Christine, but she left the show before filming when it was decided she was not right for the part. Post was hired as her replacement before taping, but was only available for a single episode as she was still a regular on The Fall Guy;" she would join the cast permanently at the beginning of season three. Paul Lieber appears as a defendant.
16	3	"Billie and the Cat"	Lee Bernhardi	Zachary D. Wechsler	October 18, 1984	185604	16.2/25
Harry sends the new public defender, Billie Young (Ellen Foley), to jail for refusing to reveal the whereabouts of a cat her client is accused of kidnapping. Note: Ellen Foley makes her first appearance as public defender Billie Young.
17	4	"Pick a Number"	Jeff Melman	Ron Osborn & Jeff Reno	October 25, 1984	185605	18.1/27
The courtroom becomes a circus when a meek little fellow chooses Harry to decide what worthy person will receive the money from his winning lottery ticket.
18	5	"The Computer Kid"	Jim Drake	Bob Stevens	November 1, 1984	185607	15.5/24
A precocious, yet ill-mannered computer whiz barricades himself in Harry's office and threatens to wipe out all his school's records.
19	6	"Bull Gets a Kid"	Jeff Melman	Nat Mauldin	November 8, 1984	185608	15.9/24
Bull is finally allowed a foster son by a volunteer-fathers organization, but he winds up with a surprise when he learns the kid is a girl (Pamela Adlon, credited as "Pamela Segall") posing as a boy to help out her single mother.
20	7	"Harry on Trial"	Jeff Melman	Stuart Kreisman & Chris Cluess	November 15, 1984	185609	17.4/27
Harry is called before a disciplinary board for his unorthodox courtroom behavior at the instigation of another judge (Jason Bernard). Note: Ray Walston guest stars.
21	8	"Harry and the Madam"	Noam Pitlik	Tony Sheehan	November 22, 1984	185610	13.6/24
Harry feels a lot of official pressure when a notorious madame with a hot diary comes before his bench; Bull tries to save Mac's turkey from getting killed for Thanksgiving.
22	9	"Inside Harry Stone"	Jeff Melman	Stuart Kreisman & Chris Cluess	November 29, 1984	185606	17.9/27
Harry is reluctant to undergo tests for his ulcer symptoms, until Billie confesses her true feelings for him. Note: John Astin guest stars as a hospital patient named Kenny; he would later have a recurring role as Harry's father, Buddy Ryan.
23	10	"The Blizzard"	Jeff Melman	Reinhold Weege	December 6, 1984	185611	18.6/28
A blizzard traps everyone in the courthouse and Dan in an elevator with a gay man (Jack Riley) who confessed his attraction to him after a trial involving his pet dog.
24	11	"Take My Wife, Please"	Jeff Melman	Tom Reeder	December 13, 1984	185612	17.1/26
Mac marries Quon Le Duc (Denice Kumagai), a girl he knew in Vietnam, for her to stay in the country; Harry conducts court despite temporary blindness. Note: Michael Richards appears as a man who believes he is invisible, and the unofficial start of Seinfeld 4 years later
25	12	"The Birthday Visitor"	Gary Shimokawa	Ron Osborn & Jeff Reno	January 3, 1985	185613	17.3/25
When Billie takes Harry back to her place after celebrating his birthday, the duo's plans for romance are disrupted by an insecure intruder.
26	13	"Dan's Parents"	Jeff Melman	Reinhold Weege	January 10, 1985	185614	18.2/25
Dan's past is revealed when the parents (John McIntire and Jeanette Nolan, married actors in real life), whom he told everyone were dead, come from Louisiana to visit their successful "sonny boy".
27	14	"Nuts About Harry"	Jeff Melman	Tom Reeder	January 17, 1985	185603	19.1/28
Patients from a mental institution stage a strike to convince the court they're being mistreated at the hospital. Note: This was initially scheduled to be the second episode of the season but was postponed and instead aired out of sequence. Ellen Foley does not appear and is also missing from the opening credits; her character of Billie is not mentioned, and no explanation is given for her absence. Deborah Harmon appears as overeager idealistic newly-assigned public defender Sue Harper. James Cromwell and Kevin Peter Hall guest star as two members of a group of escapees from a mental home who wind up in court for not paying their taxi fare.
28	15	"An Old Flame"	Jeff Melman	Nat Mauldin	January 24, 1985	185615	17.2/26
Selma's old beau (Jack Gilford) wants to rekindle their romance and take care of her, and a substitute judge (Phil Leeds) isn't what he's cracked up to be.
29	16	"The Gypsy"	Alan Bergmann	Howard Ostroff	January 31, 1985	185616	19.7/28
Harry uses a little hocus-pocus to convince Bull he's cured of a curse on the court made by a disgruntled plaintiff, a powerful gypsy (Erica Yohn).
30	17	"Battling Bailiff"	Jeff Melman	Stuart Kreisman & Chris Cluess	February 7, 1985	185617	16.2/24
Bull quits his job in frustration and becomes a professional wrestler. Note: Lou Ferrigno guest stars.
31	18	"Billie's Valentine"	Jeff Melman	Bob Stevens	February 14, 1985	185618	19.3/29
Billie's new boyfriend turns out to be a professional problem, despite his romantic accomplishments.
32	19	"Married Alive"	Jeff Melman	Ron Osborn & Jeff Reno	February 21, 1985	185619	18.6/28
His friends believe the worst when Dan starts dating an awkward and plain young woman (Mimi Kennedy) who happens to be the daughter of a multimillionaire. Note: William Utay's first appearance as Phil Sanders the bum.
33	20	"Mac and Quon Le: Together Again"	Alan Bergmann	Tom Reeder	February 28, 1985	185620	17.4/27
Quon Le appears before the court for prostitution, and Harry has to choose between Billie and Dan for the mayoral commission. Note: Selma Diamond does not appear in this episode.
34	21	"World War III"	Alan Bergmann	Nat Mauldin	May 2, 1985	185621	17.6/28
Harry searches for Yakov's brother, a Russian circus defector. Meanwhile, Soviet and American agents (Leonard Stone and Gordon Jump) negotiate an arms agreement. Note: This is the final appearance of Selma Diamond before her death on May 13, 1985.
35	22	"Walk, Don't Wheel"	Reinhold Weege	Reinhold Weege	May 9, 1985	185622	16.0/26
A disabled law student takes Harry's refusal of her prom invitation as a slap against her handicap. Note: Selma Diamond does not appear. This is the final appearance of Ellen Foley.

=== Season 3 (1985–86) ===
No. overall	No. in season	Title	Directed by	Written by	Original release date	Prod. code	Rating/share (households)
36	1	"Hello, Goodbye"	Jeff Melman	Reinhold Weege	September 26, 1985	185711	22.9/34
Everyone tries to adjust to Selma's death as Harry interviews possible replacements, but Bull goes on a drinking binge instead; public defender Christine Sullivan is permanently assigned to the court, to both Harry and Dan's delight. Note: Markie Post and Florence Halop join the cast as public defender Christine Sullivan and bailiff Florence Kleiner, respectively. The episode ends with a brief tribute to Selma Diamond.
37	2	"The Hostage"	Jeff Melman	Bob Stevens	October 3, 1985	185713	20.4/30
A man charged with stealing electronic parts takes Dan hostage and demands the rest of the parts he needs to communicate with his home planet of Saturn.
38	3	"Dad's First Date"	Jeff Melman	Reinhold Weege	October 17, 1985	185716	21.3/33
Christine's father (Eugene Roche) has his first date in eight years and ends up in court, charged with soliciting a prostitute (Estelle Harris); Harry also must deal with the tenants of a clothing-optional building.
39	4	"Mac and Quon Le: No Reservations"	Alan Bergmann	Teresa O'Neill	October 24, 1985	185712	18.3/26
Mac tries to hide Quon Le from his prejudiced grandfather, who's going to loan Mac the money he needs to open a restaurant.
40	5	"Halloween, Too"	Alan Bergmann	Teresa O'Neill	October 31, 1985	185719	22.0/34
Harry falls hook, line and sinker for a beautiful woman, (Mary Margaret Humes) who turns out to be a real witch. Anne Ramsey appears as another member of the coven.
41	6	"Best of Friends"	Reinhold Weege	Howard Ostroff	November 7, 1985	185718	18.2/26
Dan has a real problem when his high school buddy comes to visit as a decidedly changed man. Meanwhile, the rest of the staff try to explain to Bull what a transgender woman is.
42	7	"Dan's Boss"	Jeff Melman	Bob Stevens	November 14, 1985	185720	21.7/33
Dan's life becomes a living hell when he cracks short jokes to a little person who turns out to be his boss. Note: First appearance by Daniel Frishman as Vincent Daniels. Also Robert Englund plays a character who believes Earth is being invaded by aliens.
43	8	"Up On the Roof"	Jeff Melman	Jeffrey Davis & Julie Fleischer	November 28, 1985	185717	19.9/33
Harry tries to free a rock star literally imprisoned by his overly solicitous entourage. Note: Markie Post's real-life husband, Michael A. Ross, portrays Eddie Devon in this episode.
44	9	"The Wheels of Justice"	Alan Bergmann	Jeff Reno & Ron Osborn	December 5, 1985	185714	21.2/32
45	10	"The Wheels of Justice"	Alan Bergmann	Nat Mauldin	December 12, 1985	185715	20.9/32
Part 1: Everyone is in a financial crisis when the city can't pay its employees, Harry has to evict a woman and son from a sleazy hotel, and a homeless couple from West Virginia (the picaresque Wheelers, played by Brent Spiner and Annie O'Donnell) tells their tale of woe. The Wheelers appear in several future episodes. Part 2: Things go from bad to worse, when Harry learns that the son from the previous case was shot in a robbery, and he resigns as judge.
46	11	"Walk Away, Renee"	Jim Drake	Teresa O'Neill	December 19, 1985	185723	20.1/31
Bull gets a new girlfriend, but the rest of the staff recognizes her as a gold-digging prostitute who's been in and out of court and jail many times. However, when Bull finds out and confronts Renee, his pity on her causes Renee to have an emotional meltdown. Meanwhile, Dan has a date with a dominatrix, but his injuries from Bull's rampage put a dent in his plans.
47	12	"Dan's Escort"	Jeff Melman	Bob Stevens	January 9, 1986	185724	21.7/32
Dan takes a job as a paid escort for a wealthy, lonely woman (Barbara Cason) who expects a lot for her money, and Yakov appeals to Harry for help when his wife is arrested on a visit to the U.S.
48	13	"The Night Off"	Jim Drake	Nat Mauldin and Reinhold Weege	January 16, 1986	185725	22.9/33
A burned-out older judge (Jeff Corey) brought in to substitute for Harry exhibits bizarre behavior: he issues a bench arrest for the Rockettes, imprisons Dan and Mac for contempt, and appoints Florence and Phil (William Utay) as the defending and prosecuting attorneys.
49	14	"Harry and Leon"	Jeff Melman	Nat Mauldin	January 23, 1986	185727	22.0/32
Harry takes pity on the building shoeshine boy (Bumper Robinson), who seeks refuge from a social worker trying to place him in another foster home.
50	15	"The Apartment"	Jim Drake	Teresa O'Neill	January 30, 1986	185728	21.2/31
Harry throws a surprise birthday for Dan whose date is extremely anxious to be home by midnight.
51	16	"Leon, We Hardly Knew Ye"	John Larroquette	Bob Stevens	February 6, 1986	185729	21.7/32
Harry's concern with Leon's imminent adoption blinds him to the presence of Mel Tormé in the courthouse.
52	17	"The Mugger"	Jim Drake	Robert Perlow & Gene Braunstein	February 20, 1986	185726	20.9/30
After being mugged, Christine becomes belligerent and mistrustful, and unable to do her job as public defender. She has to rediscover her compassion when her mugger is trapped in the cafeteria and threatens hostages with a grenade. Meanwhile, Phil gets a hot stock tip from an old Wall Street buddy, and Dan nearly bankrupts himself trying to wheedle it out of him.
53	18	"Could This Be Magic?"	Jim Drake	Jack Carrerow & Lisa A. Bannick	February 27, 1986	185725	22.8/34
Harry decides to help his idol, a down-and-out magician (Carl Ballantine), who goes on to help himself to Harry's possessions.
54	19	"Monkey Business"	Jeff Melman	Nat Mauldin	March 6, 1986	185721	20.9/31
Bull tries to save a baby orangutan from animal-research experiments.
55	20	"Flo's Retirement"	Tim Steele	Nat Mauldin	March 13, 1986	185730	20.8/31
The staff tries everything they can think of to postpone Florence's involuntary but mandatory retirement.
56	21	"Hurricane"	Jeff Melman	Reinhold Weege	May 1, 1986	185731	21.7/33
57	22	"Hurricane"	Jeff Melman	Reinhold Weege	May 8, 1986	185732	20.4/31
The courtroom becomes a delivery room when Hurricane Mel traps four pregnant women. Dick Butkus, Brent Spiner, Alix Elias, Pam Grier, and James Widdoes appear. Note: Final appearance of Florence Halop as Florence Kleiner; Halop died on July 15, 1986.

=== Season 4 (1986–87) ===
No. overall	No. in season	Title	Directed by	Written by	Original release date	Prod. code	Rating/share (households)
58	1	"The Next Voice You Hear..."	Jeff Melman	Reinhold Weege	October 2, 1986	185931	26.8/41
Harry's distracted from a courtroom full of ventriloquists and their dummies by the delivery of a letter from his mother, mailed fifteen years earlier. Note: First appearance of Marsha Warfield as bailiff Rosalind Russell and John Astin as Harry's stepfather Buddy Ryan.
59	2	"Giving Thanks"	Jeff Melman	Teresa O'Neill	October 9, 1986	185935	23.2/34
Christine tries to get out of Dan's demand to sleep with her after he saves her from choking to death on her lunch.
60	3	"Author, Author"	Jeff Melman	Dennis Koenig	October 16, 1986	185933	25.5/39
Bull tries his hand at writing a children's story for a contest, but when one of the judges personally appears to criticize how disturbing and violent it is, Bull becomes upset. Meanwhile, Dan is at the sexual mercy of a woman (Fran Drescher) diagnosed with multiple personality disorder.
61	4	"Halloween II: The Return of Leon"	Tim Steele	Linwood Boomer	October 30, 1986	185934	25.6/39
Harry looks forward to seeing Leon the orphan boy again while Dan does whatever he can to get invited to his boss' Halloween party. Note: Night Court was preempted by the fifth game of the 1986 World Series on October 23, 1986.
62	5	"Dan's Operation"	Jeff Melman	Bob Stevens	November 6, 1986	185936	25.8/38
63	6	"Dan's Operation"	Jeff Melman	Bob Stevens	November 13, 1986	185937	25.1/38
Dan refuses to admit his surgery has weakened him and overexerts himself into a coma. Later, his friends maintain a bedside vigil and reminisce about the good times they've had.
64	7	"The New Judge"	Jeff Melman	Linwood Boomer	November 20, 1986	185939	24.3/36
Dan makes a friend out of a substituting judge until he realizes the man is trying to bribe him, and his friends talk him into wearing a wire to entrap the man.
65	8	"Contempt of Courting"	Jeff Melman	Tom Straw	November 27, 1986	185938	20.1/36
Harry returns and finds a lovely woman substituting on the bench for him, who likes him a lot and jails Christine for mouthing off about perceived mistreatment of a client.
66	9	"Earthquake"	Jeff Melman	Dennis Koenig	December 4, 1986	185940	26.1/39
A mild earthquake traps Dan, Roz, and two sumo wrestlers in an elevator. Meanwhile Harry has to deal with three kids who are spitting images for Dan, Christine, and Harry himself.
67	10	"Prince of a Guy"	Tim Steele	Tom Reeder	December 11, 1986	185941	27.7/41
Harry tries to prevent the forced marriage of a Polynesian princess while her brother tries to bid on Christine.
68	11	"New Year's Leave"	John Larroquette	Tom Straw	December 18, 1986	185942	27.3/42
Harry deals sympathetically with an escaped felon (Harold Gould) whose only wish is to spend New Year's Eve in Times Square to celebrate his 42nd wedding anniversary.
69	12	"Murder"	Jeff Melman	Reinhold Weege	January 8, 1987	185943	24.4/38
Harry has to deal with a woman who confesses to him that she killed her husband that morning, a detective who can't get used to working without his partner, and a morose Dan who was rejected as a sperm bank donor.
70	13	"Baby Talk"	Jeff Melman	Tom Reeder	January 15, 1987	185932	26.6/39
Mac goes on a drunken spree in a cowboy bar after Quon Le spends them into bankruptcy and then announces her pregnancy.
71	14	"The Modest Proposal"	Jeff Melman	Howard Ostroff	January 29, 1987	185944	26.2/38
Harry scoffs when Christine announces her engagement.
72	15	"A Day in the Life"	Thomas Klein	Nat Mauldin, Teresa O'Neill and Bob Stevens	February 5, 1987	185945	24.9/36
Harry must judge all his cases by midnight.
73	16	"Rabid"	Jim Drake	Dennis Koenig	February 12, 1987	185946	25.4/38
The gang searches for a dog that saved Harry from a fire but has bitten Dan and may have given him rabies.
74	17	"Christine's Friend"	Jim Drake	Bob Stevens	February 19, 1987	185947	25.0/36
Harry and Dan compete to take Christine's hot friend (Sela Ward) away to a romantic weekend getaway.
75	18	"Caught Red Handed"	Harry Anderson and Howard Ritter	Harry Anderson	February 26, 1987	185948	N/A
Christine's new boss (Michael Gross) sexually harasses her and Harry helps Christine catch him in the act. Meanwhile, Dan meets his match in a woman (Teresa Ganzel) who has sworn herself to celibacy.
76	19	"Paternity"	Jim Drake	Teresa O'Neill	March 18, 1987	185950	18.5/28
Dan discovers that a smart-mouthed kid (Matt Shakman) who insults him may be his long-lost son.
77	20	"Here's to You, Mrs. Robinson"	Jim Drake	Tom Reeder	March 25, 1987	185949	16.6/25
Quon Le plans to become a US citizen before her baby is born, but she and Mac are both rushed to the hospital with pains just as Harry begins the swearing-in ceremony.
78	21	"Her Honor (Part 1 & 2)"	Jeff Melman	Linwood Boomer	April 29, 1987	185951	14.9/24
79	22	"Her Honor (Part 1 & 2)"	Jeff Melman	Linwood Boomer	May 6, 1987	185952	15.2/25
Part 1: Dan thinks he will become a new judge, but Christine is awarded the position. However, Harry discovers his name is not on the judge's reappointment list. Meanwhile, the Wheelers, the hick couple from West Virginia, become the proprietors of the concession stand. Part 2: Upon learning that Harry will not be reappointed as a judge, he disappears to perform an outrageous stunt, not realizing that Christine got Harry his job back.

=== Season 5 (1987–88) ===
No. overall	No. in season	Title	Directed by	Written by	Original release date	Prod. code	Rating/share (households)
80	1	"Her Honor (Part 3 & 4)"	Jeff Melman	Linwood Boomer	September 17, 1987	186201	18.5/31
81	2	"Her Honor (Part 3 & 4)"	Jeff Melman	Linwood Boomer	September 24, 1987	186203	24.9/40
Part 3: Christine nervously takes the bench as Dan and Mac try to cover for the newly-reinstated Harry, who's planning the greatest prank of all time. Part 4: Harry, while preparing to attempt his outrageous stunt, talks to and saves the life of a suicidal man. Christine realizes she cannot look at cases neutrally and goes back to being a defense attorney.
82	3	"Death of a Bailiff"	Jeff Melman	Bob Underwood	October 15, 1987	186202	23.2/38
Bull has a near-death experience after getting struck by lightning at the courthouse, and soon becomes overly charitable when he gives away everything in his life savings to the homeless.
83	4	"Ladies Night"	Jeff Melman	Paul J. Raley	October 22, 1987	186207	20.8/32
Christine and Roz visit a male strip joint to do some female bonding, but Harry and the guys show up just as the show gets going.
84	5	"Safe"	Tim Steele	Tom Reeder	October 29, 1987	186206	25.0/38
On Halloween, Harry traps himself inside a safe while practicing a magic trick and laments over his obsession with magic and pranks. Meanwhile, a man in a devil costume gives Dan $100 in exchange for his soul.
85	6	"Mac's Dilemma"	Jeff Melman	Gary Murphy & Larry Strawther	November 12, 1987	186205	24.7/38
An old friend who saved his life in Vietnam, Horace "Hondo" Jenkins (David Graf) asks Mac to lose his court records. Meanwhile, a Japanese man about to be honored by the governor dies just as he's being put in custody for soliciting prostitutes and Bull loses track of the man's corpse.
86	7	"Who Was That Mashed Man?"	Jeff Melman	Story by : Tom Straw & R.J. Colleary; Teleplay by : Tom Straw	November 19, 1987	186211	26.1/40
Dan's boss, Vincent Daniels, orders Dan to look out for Daniels' very sexy visiting niece, Kitty (Teri Hatcher) while Harry tries to prevent a TV hero of yesteryear from committing suicide after being taken to court over an order to not wear his costume or act like his character because of a movie adaptation.
87	8	"No Hard Feelings"	Jeff Melman	Tom Straw	November 29, 1987	186204	17.1/24
Harry hires a blind assistant (Elayne Boosler) whose abrasive sense of humor puts everyone on edge and Dan struggles with impotence when he meets a seductive prospective employer (Janice Lynde).
88	9	"Constitution"	Jeff Melman	Rich Reinhart	December 3, 1987	186209	22.2/35
89	10	"Constitution"	Jeff Melman	Rich Reinhart	December 10, 1987	186210	22.9/36
Part 1: Harry tangles with a desperate man holding an original draft of the Constitution hostage in the courtroom. Meanwhile, Roz struggles with being diagnosed with diabetes. Part 2: The Constitution draft hostage escalates in Harry's courtroom while Dan and Christine try to save Roz after her insulin overdose leads to erratic behavior.
90	11	"Let It Snow"	Jeff Melman	Tom Reeder	December 17, 1987	186213	25.0/40
A blizzard traps everyone in the courthouse and cancels holiday plans, including a visit from Bull's mother, the skipper of a garbage scow.
91	12	"Dan, the Walking Time Bomb"	Tim Steele	Gary Murphy & Larry Strawther	January 7, 1988	186212	25.5/39
A crazed man (Patrick Thomas O'Brien) handcuffs a briefcase to Dan that turns out to be rigged with a bomb. Meanwhile, Joy shows Bull what it's like to be blind.
92	13	"Hit the Road, Jack"	Jeff Melman	Dennis Koenig	January 14, 1988	186208	25.9/39
Christine's father makes plans to retire to Florida, but winds up living with her and hanging out with Dan.
93	14	"I'm OK, You're Catatonic/Schizophrenic"	Jeff Melman	Reinhold Weege	January 21, 1988	186215	25.1/38
Dan ties up Mel Tormé so Harry can meet him, but the judge is preoccupied with trying to keep his stepfather Buddy and his catatonic schizophrenic friend (Shelley Berman) out of the mental hospital.
94	15	"Chrizzi's Honor"	Jeff Melman	James Gates	February 11, 1988	186216	23.9/36
A very nice stranger (George Deloy) on the run from the mob crashes Christine's anniversary party of Prince Charles' marriage to Diana Spencer.
95	16	"Another Day in the Life"	Jeff Melman	Larry Strawther & Gary Murphy	February 18, 1988	186217	18.3/27
Panic grips the courtroom as the gang races to clear 207 cases in one session so a millionaire will donate money to save an orphanage and so Dan can win an office pool for the most convictions.
96	17	"Heart of Stone"	Tim Steele	Bob Underwood	February 25, 1988	186214	18.8/27
An old flame of Harry's drops by to renew their relationship but neglects to tell him she's married. Meanwhile, Dan bails out of bowling night with the staff so he can have sex with his latest fling, but he and Harry end up out on the ledge when Mac, Christine, Bull, and Roz go looking for them.
97	18	"Russkie Business"	Jeff Melman	Tom Reeder	March 25, 1988	186221	12.4/22
Soviet defector Yakov Korolenko returns for some help in getting a visa to return to Russia to visit his sick mother, while sparks fly between Harry and a charming Soviet consul named Ludmila Irena Medavoy (aka Irena Ferris). Meanwhile, Christine finds a secret admirer letter from Johnny Carson (who appears as himself) and thinks it's a trick.
98	19	"Jung and the Restless"	Tim Steele	Tom Straw	April 1, 1988	186220	13.1/23
The gang joins Roz in a therapist group she's required to attend to temper her hostile attitude at work, which turns into a police situation when a young, inexperienced gangbanger (Don Cheadle) holds everyone hostage.
99	20	"Top Judge"	Jeff Melman	Dennis Koenig	April 8, 1988	186219	10.7/19
Harry becomes uncharacteristically glum and morose when an elderly judge dies after one of Harry's pranks. His friends urge him to respond when a new judge (Gary Kroeger) lays claim to Harry's crown as the "King of the Courtroom Cutups."
100	21	"Mac's Millions"	Tim Steele	Linwood Boomer	May 5, 1988	186218	21.7/35
Mac quits after inheriting $2 million from his grandfather, leaving his friends at the mercy of the most incompetent court clerk in New York.
101	22	"Danny Got His Gun (Part 1)"	Jeff Melman	Gary Murphy & Larry Strawther	May 12, 1988	186222	19.9/33
Part one of three. Dan tries to dodge his active duty for the Army Reserve until he learns it will be in a tropical paradise with a beautiful lady officer.

=== Season 6 (1988–89) ===
No. overall	No. in season	Title	Directed by	Written by	Original release date	Prod. code	U.S. viewers (millions)
102	1	"Danny Got His Gun (Part 2 & 3)"	Jeff Melman	Gary Murphy & Larry Strawther	October 26, 1988	186461	26.6
103	2	"Danny Got His Gun (Part 2 & 3)"	Jeff Melman	Gary Murphy & Larry Strawther	October 26, 1988	186462	26.6
Parts two of three and conclusion. After a plane wreck, Dan is rescued by some Inuit and must save a tribeswoman by performing an emergency appendectomy. Meanwhile, the night court staff fear that Dan is dead and hold a funeral for him.
104	3	"Fire"	Jeff Melman	Bob Underwood	November 2, 1988	186463	17.4
A fire breaks out in the building so everyone is forced to retreat to the morgue for safety, but this doesn't stop Dan from watching the election results for his race for the state assembly.
105	4	"Harry and the Tramp"	Jeff Melman	Nancy Steen & Neil Thompson	November 9, 1988	186464	25.5
During a trial over a disturbance at an adult film award show, Harry learns that his date (Wendy Schaal) is one of the actresses.
106	5	"Educating Rhoda"	Jeff Melman	Harold Kimmel	November 16, 1988	186465	23.8
Bull falls for a sweet, but inept bailiff trainee (Denny Dillon) who allows a psychotic, movie-obsessed woman (Nana Visitor) to escape, and things get worse when Dan takes the woman to a sleazy motel during his lunch break.
107	6	"The Last Temptation of Mac"	Jeff Melman	Tom Reeder	November 23, 1988	186466	21.0
Christine wears herself out planning a Thanksgiving feast for the courthouse regulars and Mac faces the seduction of an attractive classmate (Renée Jones).
108	7	"The Law Club"	Tim Steele	Alison Rosenfeld	November 30, 1988	186467	24.5
Dan has to choose between Christine and membership in an exclusive law club when his sponsor demands his silence about his plans to seduce her to win a sexual scavanger hunt.
109	8	"Night Court of the Living Dead"	Tim Steele	Paul J. Raley	December 14, 1988	186468	25.4
An inventor runs away from court to avoid being committed to Bellevue, a man just out of a 20 year coma appears before the bench, and Christine fences with her replacement when a computer error declares her dead.
110	9	"The Night Court Before Christmas"	Tim Steele	Bob Underwood	December 21, 1988	186469	25.8
Buddy comes to visit Harry for the holidays and Roz is arrested for appropriating a sled full of toys and distributing them to needy children.
111	10	"Mental Giant"	Jeff Melman	Tom Reeder	January 11, 1989	186470	23.9
Bull scores very high on an I.Q. test and is offered a cushy job at a think-tank trying to communicate mentally with test animals.
112	11	"Rock-a-Bye Baby"	Jeff Melman	Nancy Steen & Neil Thompson	January 18, 1989	186473	25.2
Christine wears herself to a frazzle watching a neighbor's baby while the others monopolize her television watching a lacrosse game.
113	12	"Clip Show"	Jeff Melman	Larry Strawther & Gary Murphy	January 25, 1989	186471	29.2
114	13	"Clip Show"	Jeff Melman	Larry Strawther & Gary Murphy	January 25, 1989	186472	29.2
A city auditor (Richard Sanders) tries to investigate some of the more bizarre expenses attributed to Harry's court (via flashbacks) but he's interrupted by a clown (Jack Riley) wielding a gun and threatening to shoot everyone.
115	14	"The Trouble is Not in Your Set"	Jeff Melman	Mike Imfeld	February 1, 1989	186474	26.3
A woman (Marion Ross) who can't tell where her life begins and television ends interrupts the proceedings brandishing a grenade and demanding that her husband be released from prison and given a pardon.
116	15	"The Game Show"	Jeff Melman	Bob Underwood	February 15, 1989	186475	25.7
Bull goes on a game show to raise money for a rec center, but the gang has to hypnotize him so that he is not too nervous to go on. Meanwhile, a cantankerous, old female judge (Florence Stanley) wreaks havoc in the courtroom while Harry is away.
117	16	"This Old Man"	Jeff Melman	Nancy Steen & Neil Thompson	March 1, 1989	186476	27.8
Harry and the gang refuse to take Christine and her new beau seriously because of his age. Meanwhile, Dan dates a middle-aged woman after hearing that she's wealthy enough to help his campaign.
118	17	"Strange Bedfellows"	Jeff Melman	Tom Reeder	March 8, 1989	186477	26.9
Dan finally meets his opponent (Janet Zarish) for the state assembly seat on election day and falls in love with her. Meanwhile, Harry gives his flu to Mel Tormé in exchange for two concert tickets.
119	18	"From Snoop to Nuts"	Jeff Melman	Harry Anderson	March 15, 1989	186478	26.3
120	19	"From Snoop to Nuts"	Jeff Melman	Story by : Larry Strawther, Gary Murphy and Harry Anderson; Teleplay by : Gary Murphy & Larry Strawther	March 22, 1989	186479	24.4
Part 1: Christine is worried about Harry after he rants about the justice system being a joke after a mobster is acquitted of all charges and suddenly sees Harry talking to the acquitted mobster about protecting him from legal interference (not knowing that the whole thing is part of an undercover sting). And things get worse when Buddy reveals to Harry that he's his biological father (and not his stepfather) and accidentally tells the mobster about Harry's sting operation. Part 2: Harry's world falls apart following Buddy's revelation over who his biological father is, and Dan freaks out when he thinks two men in tailored suits are the killers enforced to go after Harry over the sting operation.
121	20	"Pen Pals"	Jeff Melman	Bob Underwood	April 12, 1989	186480	24.3
Roz falls in love with Christine's prison pen pal (Dennis Haysbert), who has escaped from prison; Dan flirts with a law student, but grosses her out, thanks to a roach infestation in the courthouse.
122	21	"Not My Type"	Tim Steele	James Gates	April 26, 1989	186481	20.8
Christine accepts a date with Art the handyman, then regrets it when she escorts him to his lodge club meeting's annual dinner/talent show; meanwhile Mac's children's story for school is lost in the courthouse computer.
123	22	"Yet Another Day in the Life"	Jeff Melman	Neil Thompson & Nancy Steen	May 3, 1989	186482	22.3
The gang tries to set another record for cases adjudicated as the building slowly floods, causing prisoners to pile up in the hallways and Dan grinds his teeth to be off by midnight to catch a flight to anywhere.

=== Season 7 (1989–90) ===
No. overall	No. in season	Title	Directed by	Written by	Original release date	Prod. code	U.S. viewers (millions)
124	1	"Life With Buddy"	Jim Drake	Bob Underwood	September 27, 1989	186331	25.3
Buddy leaves the mental institution and moves in with Harry while Dan and his real estate agent scheme to take over a dying man's Park Avenue apartment.
125	2	"If I Were a Rich Man"	Jim Drake	Gary Murphy & Larry Strawther	October 11, 1989	186333	19.5
Bull saves the life of Jordan King, a billionaire land developer, and Dan plans on swindling him. Meanwhile, Quon Le gets involved in a cosmetics pyramid scheme and Mac steps in after she gets sick.
126	3	"The Cop and the Lady"	Jim Drake	Nancy Steen & Neil Thompson	October 18, 1989	186332	25.8
Christine falls for the officer assigned to protect Dan when the sleazy DA receives several death threats. Meanwhile, Bull records a video letter to his mom, and Roz tries to avoid appearing on camera.
127	4	"Come Back to the Five and Dime, Stephen King, Stephen King"	Tim Steele	Fred Rubin	October 25, 1989	186334	23.6
On Halloween night, Harry loses his new bat, Tito, and an exorcist's curse resurrects the unquiet spirit of a defendant from fifty years earlier.
128	5	"Blue Suede Bull"	Jim Drake	Bill Bryan	November 1, 1989	186335	22.3
Harry embarrasses Christine in front of a very pro-feminist judge with his trick handcuffs while Dan takes Bull out to his favorite nightclub after Bull thinks his girlfriend, Rhoda, is cheating on him with a student in her dental hygienist class.
129	6	"For Love or Money"	Jim Drake	Neil Thompson & Nancy Steen	November 8, 1989	186336	21.3
Buddy proposes to a wealthy, fun-loving widow who doesn't know he's a mental patient while Dan tries to hide the fact that he's been reduced to living in his office following his botched real estate plan.
130	7	"Auntie Maim"	Jim Drake	Bob Underwood	November 15, 1989	186338	20.8
Roz drafts Mac to pose as her fiancé when her overbearing aunt (Della Reese) comes to visit; Dan meets an older actress/wealthy socialite (Magda Harout) who teaches him some new tricks in an elevator.
131	8	"Attack of the Mac Snacks"	Jim Drake	Harry Anderson & Turk Pipkin	November 22, 1989	186337	16.8
Mac's plan to sell his wife's snacks hits a snag when a snack magnate interested in the product drops dead in the court cafeteria. Meanwhile, Christine's stingy uncle visits her, and Dan pretends he's in touch with his feminine side to win over a woman who thinks all men only want her for sex.
132	9	"Branded (Part 1)"	Jim Drake	Bill Bryan	November 29, 1989	186341	23.6
Part one of two. Dan becomes the target for first a job offer, then disbarment proceedings when a wealthy lawyer seeks to get charges against his son dropped. Meanwhile, Christine and Roz become diet buddies.
133	10	"Branded (Part 2)"	Jim Drake	Bill Bryan	December 6, 1989	186342	20.3
Conclusion. Dan takes a job at a French restaurant as he awaits his disbarment hearing.
134	11	"Passion Plundered"	Jim Drake	Gail Rock	December 20, 1989	186343	20.7
Dan and Harry each vie for the attentions of an attractive reporter (Annette McCarthy) doing a story on Harry's courtroom, but Christine learns that the journalist is her favorite novelist and a lesbian. Meanwhile, a trio of jugglers from an obscure, Eastern European country hit on Roz.
135	12	"Amore or Less"	Jim Drake	Fred Rubin	January 3, 1990	186339	23.1
Christine finds everyone too busy to help her out with her new romance so she turns to two feuding sisters (Jodi Carlisle and Lynne Marie Stewart) who happen to be competing advice columnists.
136	13	"Razing Bull"	Jim Drake	Fred Rubin	January 17, 1990	186344	22.2
An old theater's demolition prompts Bull to chain himself to the entrance in protest. At the same time, Harry tries to get a petition to stop the demolition, and Christine discovers that Mac was once a member of a doo-wop group who blamed him for quitting before they could hit the big time.
137	14	"Futureman"	Tim Steele	Leonard Mlodinow & Scott Rubenstein	January 24, 1990	186340	25.1
Dan is held hostage in the courtroom by two thugs but a man said to be from the future — VHK 937 — appears on a mission to save him.
138	15	"Wedding Bell Blues (Part 1)"	Jim Drake	Larry Strawther & Gary Murphy	February 7, 1990	186346	21.5
Christine makes an impulsive decision at her farewell dinner with beau Tony, one that has severe repercussions when he leaves on an assignment he may not return from.
139	16	"Wedding Bell Blues (Part 2)"	Jim Drake	Gary Murphy & Larry Strawther	February 14, 1990	186347	21.5
Christine deals with Tony's departure and her unexpected pregnancy.
140	17	"The Talk Show"	Jim Drake	Nancy Steen & Neil Thompson	February 21, 1990	186345	19.8
Dan becomes the host of a Morton Downey, Jr.-esque talk show where he berates the guests and gets hurt by the audience members. Meanwhile, Mac and Quon Le's vacation to Graceland is interrupted.
141	18	"Melvin and Harold"	Jim Drake	Bob Underwood	February 28, 1990	186348	22.4
Plans for Mel Tormé to appear at Harry's 40th birthday party are derailed when Harry puts his idol behind bars for failing to pay a parking ticket.
142	19	"The Glasnost Menagerie"	Tim Steele	Fred Rubin	March 7, 1990	186349	21.8
Harry helps Yakov get a visa extension for his father (Arte Johnson), who would rather hang out with Bull than with his own son. Meanwhile, Mac buys a washing machine with an attitude problem, Roz teaches Dan how to waltz, and Christine tries to choose a name for her baby.
143	20	"I Said Dance!"	Jim Drake	Bill Bryan	March 14, 1990	186350	19.0
Roz faces a lawsuit and no job after Bull borrows her gun and shoots himself in the foot, thanks to his sue-happy lawyer cousin (Gordon Clapp).
144	21	"My Three Dads"	Charles Robinson and Howard Ritter	Neil Thompson & Nancy Steen	March 28, 1990	186351	22.9
While attending childbirth class, Christine imagines what life would be like if Harry, Dan, or Bull stepped up to be the father of her child. Note: Carol Ann Susi, Lana Clarkson, Lisa Jakub, and Nikki Cox appear in this episode.
145	22	"Still Another Day in the Life"	Tim Steele	Bob Underwood	April 4, 1990	186352	18.9
In another compilation of court cases, Harry helps a young man appearing before his court stop his girlfriend's marriage to a prefab preppie, and Wile E. Coyote gets put on trial for his years of harassing the Road Runner.
146	23	"A Closer Look"	Harry Anderson and Howard Ritter	Bill Bryan, Fred Rubin, and Bob Underwood	April 11, 1990	186353	19.4
An episode of a news magazine show takes an inside look on Harry and the staff members of the Manhattan night court.
147	24	"The Blues of the Birth"	Tim Steele	Larry Strawther & Gary Murphy	May 2, 1990	186354	20.7
Christine goes into labor while trapped in an elevator with Harry's unstable father Buddy and a squeamish courtroom visitor (Stephen Furst).

=== Season 8 (1990–91) ===
No. overall	No. in season	Title	Directed by	Written by	Original release date	Prod. code	U.S. viewers (millions)
148	1	"A Family Affair (Part 1)"	Jim Drake	Chris Cluess & Stuart Kreisman	September 28, 1990	186931	16.7
Christine returns from having her baby and has to deal with the shadow of her replacement, good 'ole Ted, who turns out to be a con artist who gets busted for impersonating a surgeon and a lawyer. Meanwhile, Dan tries to reconnect with his long-lost sister (Susan Diol), and Harry discovers that he never graduated high school and needs to pass a ninth grade history test in order to keep his job. Note: First appearance of Joleen Lutz as ditzy stenographer Lisette Hocheiser.
149	2	"A Family Affair (Part 2)"	Jim Drake	Stuart Kreisman & Chris Cluess	October 5, 1990	186932	14.7
Dan learns that Bull slept with his visiting sister, and Bull decides to marry Dan's sister in order to regain his trust.
150	3	"When Harry Met Margaret"	Jim Drake	Benjy Compson	October 12, 1990	186933	16.8
Harry's first date with Margaret Turner (Mary Cadorette), the new court reporter, turns into a disaster when he follows Dan's advice.
151	4	"Can't Buy Me, Love"	Jim Drake	Elaine Aronson	October 19, 1990	186934	13.9
Dan is thrilled when he offers himself as a prize at a bachelor auction until he sees the passionate old woman who bids highest for him, and Christine is beginning to have doubts about her marriage to Tony.
152	5	"Death Takes a Halloween"	Jim Drake	Harry Anderson	October 26, 1990	186936	15.2
On Halloween, Harry locks up a defendant known as the Spirit of Death (Stephen Root), whose imprisonment causes strange cases of people not dying. Meanwhile, Dan fears that he may die after seeing his obituary in the newspaper.
153	6	"Crossroads"	Jim Drake	Bob Underwood	November 2, 1990	186937	15.4
154	7	"Crossroads"	Jim Drake	Bob Underwood	November 2, 1990	186938	15.4
Two-part episode. When the staff is quarantined for the night, they spend the hours reminiscing about turning points in their lives that led them to being hired at the night court.
155	8	"Day Court"	Jim Drake	Kevin Kelton	November 9, 1990	186935	14.0
The staff is temporarily assigned to day court, where the cases are more serious and everyone's personality is different. Meanwhile, Tony tells Christine he wants to move out.
156	9	"A Night Court at the Opera"	Jim Drake	Jim Pond & Bill Fuller	November 16, 1990	186940	15.6
Dan tries to win over Margaret during a night at the opera. Meanwhile, disciples of an ancient religion stalk Bull after a tabloid story reveals that one of their gods looks just like him.
157	10	"Nobody Says Rat Fink Anymore"	Howard Ritter	Fred Rubin	November 23, 1990	186939	17.4
Harry has to summon the courage to face a bully (Donald Gibb) from his childhood who is brought before him in court. Meanwhile, Christine, with the help of Roz, searches for a live-in nanny after her previous one is jailed for aggravated assault.
158	11	"Jail Bait"	Christine Ballard	Nancylee Myatt	December 7, 1990	186941	14.3
A street artist helps raise Christine's spirits, but his crush on her may land him jail time for repeat offenses. Meanwhile, Mac indulges a passion for photography, and so does Dan when he uses Mac's camera to take pictures of his latest sexual conquest.
159	12	"It's Just a Joke"	Howard Ritter	Lee Maddux	December 14, 1990	186942	14.8
Harry tries to make sense of a feud between a foul-mouthed comedian (Louis Mustillo) and the preacher (Clifton James) who condemns his filthy stand-up routine. Meanwhile, Bull writes an autobiography, but has to sell the book himself after getting scammed by a vanity publisher.
160	13	"Bringing Down Baby"	Charles Robinson and Howard Ritter	Elaine Aronson	January 4, 1991	186943	18.7
A TV director picks the courthouse to film an episode of The Lil'est Lawyer, a legal drama about a ten-year-old lawyer. Still, the star of the show's bratty attitude rubs everyone the wrong way, including Roz. Meanwhile, Harry gets cast as a bailiff on the show, but finds that he's not good at acting.
161	14	"Presumed Insolvent"	Jim Drake	Kevin Kelton	January 23, 1991	186944	20.0
Dan looks at Phil the bum in a whole new light when the bum rescues a defendant who's been left penniless by the late 1980s savings and loan crisis.
162	15	"Mama Was a Rollin' Stone"	Jim Drake	Bill Fuller & Jim Pond	January 30, 1991	186945	21.4
Dan anticipates a windfall from Phil the bum's will but gets a surprise instead. Meanwhile, Bull anxiously awaits a visit from his mother, an old salt due to retire from the sea and come live with her sonny boy.
163	16	"Attachments Included"	Jim Drake	Fred Rubin	February 6, 1991	186946	19.4
Christine finds herself tense over finalizing her divorce, Harry is nervous about moving in with Margaret, Dan is frustrated over what to do with the Phil Foundation money, and Bull follows his mother's advice and looks for a wife — with the help of a matchmaker. Note: Dr. Joyce Brothers appears in the cold opening.
164	17	"Alone Again, Naturally"	Tim Steele	Alison Rosenfeld-Desmarais	February 13, 1991	186947	17.9
Harry gets a wealth of conflicting advice when he confides in his friends that he thinks Margaret is about to propose marriage, but Margaret has a bombshell that's bigger than Harry's proposal. Meanwhile, Christine has a divorce party.
165	18	"Hey Harry, F'Crying Out Loud — It is a Wonderful Life... Sorta"	Jim Drake	Stuart Kreisman & Chris Cluess	February 27, 1991	186948	18.9
In this homage to It's A Wonderful Life, Harry is still depressed over his girlfriend, Margaret, leaving him. After angrily snapping at his friends and lamenting over taking his night court judge job, a guardian angel who looks like Mel Tormé visits Harry to show him what life would be like if he never took the job, which includes Dan becoming a corrupt judge, Mac becoming a bitterly-divorced district attorney, Christine losing her optimism and falling for Judge Dan, Roz being put in jail for protesting against the poor conditions of Dan's apartments, and Bull being elected deputy mayor and set up to be framed for Dan's crimes.
166	19	"To Sleep, No More"	Jim Drake	Story by : Tom Abraham & Mike Underwood; Teleplay by : Bob Underwood	March 6, 1991	186947	18.4
The court staff worries that Dan's insomnia over spending all his time preparing for the Phil Foundation banquet may be affecting his sanity. Meanwhile, Bull wins a high-end toupee in a cereal contest, and his new hair attracts all the women who once thought he was weird and repulsive. Note: Bert Parks appears as himself.
167	20	"With a Little Help From My Friends"	Kevin Sullivan	Nancylee Myatt	March 13, 1991	186949	19.6
Roz tries Christine's "happy therapy" and sets the group back several months. Meanwhile, Jack's son finally admits to himself and his dad that running the newsstand isn't for him, and Dan's dealing with the Phil Foundation opens his eyes to all of society's ills.
168	21	"Mac Takes a Vocation"	Jim Drake	Fred Rubin	March 20, 1991	186950	18.7
Harry gets riled when a Supreme Court judge woos Mac away to serve as a vote-getting token on his staff and Dan hires a British valet in an attempt to replace Phil.
169	22	"Harry's Fifteen Minutes"	Jim Drake	Bill Fuller & Jim Pond	April 3, 1991	186951	17.3
Harry lets an article naming him one of New York's ten most interesting men go to his head, and he disappoints Christine by fibbing to get out of date. Meanwhile, Dan tries to live up to his responsibilities as head of the Phil Foundation.
170	23	"Where There's a Will, There's a Tony (Part 1)"	Jim Drake	Elaine Aronson	May 1, 1991	186952	18.5
Harry experiences some very mixed emotions when Tony tries to win Christine back, and the transformed Dan gets some help in running the Phil Foundation, from Phil's twin brother Will.
171	24	"Where There's a Will, There's a Tony (Part 2)"	Jim Drake	Kevin Kelton	May 8, 1991	186953	19.3
Dan has a plan to save the Phil Foundation and Harry doesn't like Christine getting close to her ex.

=== Season 9 (1991–92) ===
No. overall	No. in season	Title	Directed by	Written by	Original release date	Prod. code	U.S. viewers (millions)
172	1	"A Guy Named Phantom (Part 1)"	Jim Drake	Chris Cluess & Stuart Kreisman	September 18, 1991	187231	24.9
Harry wrestles with his feelings for Christine. Meanwhile, with Dan missing, the court hires a loud-mouthed, amoral DA named Oscar (Gilbert Gottfried) and Christine, who is also wrestling with her feelings for Harry, gets kidnapped at a costume party.
173	2	"A Guy Named Phantom (Part 2)"	Jim Drake	Stuart Kreisman & Chris Cluess	September 25, 1991	187232	18.4
Christine finds herself in the court's sub-basement with Dan, who now goes by The Phantom of the Courthouse. Meanwhile, a detective is out to bust Dan for embezzlement, Bull keeps searching for Dan, and Oscar asks Lisette (the ditzy stenographer) out on a date.
174	3	"My Life as a Dog Lawyer"	Jim Drake	Nancylee Myatt	October 2, 1991	187233	15.9
Harry has to deal with an obnoxious foreign diplomat and prevent WWIII, while Dan struggles at his embarrassing new job.
175	4	"Puppy Love"	Jim Drake	Kevin Kelton	October 9, 1991	187234	18.6
Roz stuns her co-workers when her uptown husband (Roger E. Mosley) pays a visit to secure a divorce so he can marry again.
176	5	"Pop Goes the Question"	Jim Drake	Elaine Aronson	October 16, 1991	187235	16.2
Wanda learns on the 6-month anniversary of their first date that Bull must perform a miracle before he can marry her.
177	6	"Guess Who's Listening to Dinner?"	Jim Drake	Jim Pond & Bill Fuller	October 30, 1991	187237	18.4
Dan tries to break up with the daughter of a crime boss, who insists Dan reconsider over dinner — and that he bring along Christine. Note: This is the only episode where Harry Anderson does not appear.
178	7	"Looking for Mr. Shannon"	Jim Drake	Ben Montanio & Vince Cheung	November 6, 1991	187238	20.1
Harry, Dan, and Mac tell Christine, Roz, and Lisette the story of how Bull's bachelor party went pearshape after their party bus exploded and a deranged pizza delivery man kidnaps Bull.
179	8	"Teacher's Pet"	Jim Drake	Alison Rosenfeld Desmarais	November 13, 1991	187239	17.8
Christine is disillusioned when a law professor (George Coe) she once idolized reveals that the good grades she earned were because she wore short skirts to his class. Meanwhile, Bull undergoes an unusual ceremony to regain his virginity, which Dan and Roz think is nonsense.
180	9	"The System Works"	Jim Drake	Lee Maddux	November 17, 1991	187236	9.4
Harry has his hands full when he agrees to teach a law course with an eclectic group of students. Meanwhile, Christine writes a children's picture book showing what her job is like, but the illustrator she hires also gets hired by Dan to create a portfolio of sleazy pin-up art featuring Christine.
181	10	"Get Me to the Roof on Time"	Jim Drake	Bill Fuller & Jim Pond	November 20, 1991	187240	18.9
Bull's wedding day threatens to fall apart when bride Wanda refuses to wear Mother Hank's wedding gown, Harry and Art quarrel over being best man and Christine over-organizes everything.
182	11	"Santa on the Lam"	Howard Ritter	Lee Maddux	December 11, 1991	187242	18.8
On Christmas Eve, Dan tries to show a disillusioned Santa (Hansford Rowe) that the holiday spirit still exists as Harry tries to get away from a depressing lonely soul (Terri Hanauer) he's befriended.
183	12	"Shave and a Haircut"	Tim Steele	Kevin Kelton	January 8, 1992	187243	17.3
Harry goes all out to get Mel Tormé to accept a man-of-the-year award unaware that it's a prank. Meanwhile, Dan and Will turn into bounty hunters.
184	13	"A New York Story"	Jim Drake	Fred Graver	January 15, 1992	187244	17.9
Harry uncovers a city financial snafu when a defendant (Stephen Root) proves he owns several prominent landmarks. Meanwhile, Dan enjoys being a beauty pageant judge.
185	14	"Undressed For Success"	Jim Drake	Mike Imfeld	January 22, 1992	187241	16.9
Mac considers doing an underwear commercial for some quick cash and Roz entrusts some personal treasures to Dan.
186	15	"Poker? I Hardly Know Her"	Jim Drake	Nancylee Myatt	February 5, 1992	187245	16.2
Roz hosts a makeup/poker party while Harry redecorates his office and Dan dallies with a courtroom cutie.
187	16	"Party Girl"	Kevin Sullivan	Elaine Aronson	February 12, 1992	187246	15.7
188	17	"Party Girl"	Jim Drake	Alison Rosenfeld-Desmarais	February 12, 1992	187247	15.7
A political consultant persuades Christine to run for Congress, Dan becomes a sexual surrogate, and Mac's "artistic" take on Bull's wedding video gains a Rocky Horror Picture Show-style cult following after his video editor screens it at a midnight film festival. Note: Cristine Rose and Nancy Marchand appear in this episode.
189	18	"To Sir With... Ah, What the Heck... Love"	Jim Drake	Jim Pond & Bill Fuller	February 26, 1992	187249	14.9
Dan begins kissing up to Harry as part of his campaign to replace him on the bench when he becomes a full-time law professor, and Art, the handyman, becomes a surrogate dad to Bull when he starts dating Bull's mama.
190	19	"P.S. Do I Know You?"	Jim Drake	Nancylee Myatt & Karen Heckler	March 4, 1992	187250	14.7
Roz dreads meeting a male pen pal who's expecting someone just a little different from the real Roz. Meanwhile, Harry and Dan attempt to break into a safe they discover in Harry's office.
191	20	"Opportunity Knock Knocks"	Jim Drake	Elaine Aronson	May 13, 1992	187251	24.6
192	21	"Opportunity Knock Knocks"	Jim Drake	Nancylee Myatt	May 13, 1992	187252	24.6
In the series finale, Harry contemplates the many job opportunities coming his way, Christine runs against a Congressman who's related to Art the janitor, Dan comes to terms with his womanizing ways when a wealthy socialite bars him from marrying her daughter and he dreams that every woman in New York City is suing him; Mac considers a career change, and Bull befriends some old men who turn out to be aliens from Jupiter who need his help on their home planet. The last line of the series is Bull's reply: "Ohh-kay."
193	22	"The 1992 Boat Show"	Charles Robinson	Vince Cheung & Ben Montanio	May 31, 1992	187248	10.8
Roz steals the show and Dan's spot with the in-crowd when a gossip columnist discovers her and Lisette tries to deal with her erotic dreams about Harry. Note: This episode was originally scheduled for May 6, 1992, but aired after the series finale.
