= Iniquitous =

American death metal band

- Origin: San Antonio, Texas, U.S.
- Genre: Death metal
- Labels: Pathologically Explicit Recordings, Fivebyfive Records, Subgenre Records
- Members: Jeff Wirth; Kenny Garcia; Dennis Munoz; Mark Denton; Kevin Talley
- Past members: Mike Smith
- Website: www.myspace.com/iniquitousofficial

Iniquitous is an American death metal band from San Antonio, Texas.

== Discography ==
=== Return to Deeds of Old ===
Return to Deeds of Old is an EP by Iniquitous.

Return to Deeds of Old

EP
- Released: 2010
- Genre: Death metal
- Length: 10:36
- Label: Pathologically Explicit Recordings

chronology
''Return to Deeds of Old'' (2010)	Mechanical Pleasures (2016)

No.	Title	Length
1.	"Christened In Carnage"	4:03
2.	"I, Abomination"	3:26
3.	"Indestructible Overdose"	3:06

=== "Mechanical Pleasures" ===
"Mechanical Pleasures"

Single by Iniquitous
- Released: 2016
- Genre: Death Metal
- Length: 4:10
- Songwriter: Jeff Wirth

Iniquitous singles chronology
"Return to Deeds of Old" (2010)	"Mechanical Pleasures" (2016)

"Mechanical Pleasures" is a song by American Death Metal band Iniquitous for UFC fighter Angela Hill.

== Splits and compilations ==
- Limb Splitter II (2012)
