= Hexing a Hurricane =

- Directed by: Jeremy Campbell
- Produced by: ten18films
- Starring: Chris Rose; Angela Hill; Garland Robinette; Harry Anderson; Irvin Mayfield; Sallie Ann Glassman
- Release date: July 13, 2006
- Running time: 45 minutes
- Country: United States
- Language: English

Hexing a Hurricane is a 2006 documentary film about the effect of Hurricane Katrina on New Orleans. It has been billed as the "First Katrina documentary" released by a New Orleanian. The film was directed by Jeremy Campbell and distributed by the National Film Network. The film's score was orchestrated by New Orleans artist Eric Laws.

The film begins back when life was "normal" in New Orleans- six weeks before Hurricane Katrina and the associated levee failures devastated the city. Hexing a Hurricane opens with a 9th Ward Voodoo Ceremony at the start of Hurricane Season asking spirits for protection from dangerous storms. After the ominous hurricane strikes a few weeks following the VooDoo service, the film follows locals affected.

== Cast ==
Those appearing on screen include Chris Rose (Times-Picayune columnist), Angela Hill (WWL-TV Channel 4 news anchor), Garland Robinette, (WWL (AM) radio talk show host), Harry Anderson (actor, former resident, former local club owner), Irvin Mayfield (musician), Sallie Ann Glassman (artist, Voodoo priestess), along with various people of New Orleans.

== Awards ==
- "Best American Documentary" nominee - Rome International Film Festival
