= Night Court =

American television sitcom (1984–1992)

- Genre: Sitcom
- Created by: Reinhold Weege
- Showrunners: Reinhold Weege (seasons 1–6); Gary Murphy; Larry Strawther (both; season 7); Chris Cluess; Stu Kreisman (both; seasons 8–9)
- Starring: Harry Anderson; Markie Post; John Larroquette; Charles Robinson; Richard Moll; Marsha Warfield; Karen Austin; Paula Kelly; Selma Diamond; Ellen Foley; Florence Halop
- Opening theme: Jack Elliott
- Country of origin: United States
- Original language: English
- No. of seasons: 9
- No. of episodes: 193 (list of episodes)

Production
- Executive producers: Reinhold Weege; Larry Strawther; Gary Murphy; Chris Cluess; Stu Kreisman
- Producers: Bob Stevens; Nat Mauldin; Linwood Boomer; Tom Straw; Kevin Kelton
- Camera setup: Videotape; Multi-camera
- Running time: 23–24 minutes
- Production companies: Starry Night Productions (1984–1989) (seasons 1–6); Warner Bros. Television

Original release
- Network: NBC
- Release: January 4, 1984 – May 31, 1992

Related
- Night Court (2023 TV series)

Night Court is an American television sitcom that premiered on NBC on January 4, 1984, and ended on May 31, 1992, after nine seasons consisting of 193 episodes. The show is set in the night shift of a Manhattan Criminal Court presided over by a young, unorthodox judge, Harold "Harry" T. Stone (portrayed by Harry Anderson), and was created by comedy writer Reinhold Weege, who had previously worked on Barney Miller in the 1970s and early 1980s.

== Cast ==
=== Main ===
- Harry Anderson as Judge Harold "Harry" T. Stone
- Karen Austin as court clerk Lana Wagner (season 1)
- Gail Strickland as public defender Sheila Gardner (pilot episode only)
- John Larroquette as assistant district attorney Reinhold Daniel "Dan" Fielding Elmore
- Richard Moll as bailiff Nostradamus "Bull" Shannon
- Selma Diamond as bailiff Selma Hacker (seasons 1–2)
- Paula Kelly as public defender Liz Williams (season 1)
- Charles Robinson as court clerk Macintosh "Mac" Robinson (seasons 2–9)
- Ellen Foley as public defender Billie Young (season 2)
- Markie Post as public defender Christine Sullivan (guest season 2; main seasons 3–9)
- Florence Halop as bailiff Florence "Flo" Kleiner (née Nightingale) (season 3)
- Marsha Warfield as bailiff Rosalind "Roz" Russell (seasons 4–9)

=== Recurring ===
- Joleen Lutz as court stenographer Lisette Hocheiser (seasons 8–9) (Note: Lutz was credited in every episode regardless of whether or not she actually appeared, but was billed in the end credits as Also Starring.)
- Mike Finneran as building superintendent/repairman Art Fensterman
- Daniel Frishman as Dan's tyrannical dwarf boss District Attorney Vincent Daniels (seasons 3–5)
- Leslie Bevis as Dan's periodic lover Shiela (seasons 3–4)
- Eugene Roche as Christine's father Jack Sullivan (seasons 2–3 & 5)
- Jason Bernard as Judge Willard (seasons 1–2)
- Florence Stanley as Judge Margaret Wilbur (season 6)
- Brent Spiner and Annie O'Donnell as frequent defendants Bob and June Wheeler (seasons 3–4)
- Yakov Smirnoff as Russian immigrant Yakov Korolenko (seasons 1–3, 5 & 7)
- Mel Tormé as himself, Harry's music idol (seasons 2–9)
- Terry Kiser as tabloid courtroom reporter Al Craven (seasons 1–2)
- Rita Taggart as prostitute/frequent defendant Carla Bouvier (seasons 1–2)
- Martin Garner as newsstand owner Bernie (seasons 1–3)
- Denice Kumagai as Mac's wife Quon Le Duc Robinson (seasons 2–9)
- John Astin as Harry's step (later revealed to be birth) father Buddy Ryan (seasons 4–7)
- William Utay as vagrant/Dan's errand boy Phil Sanders (seasons 3–8) and Phil's corrupt twin brother Will (seasons 8–9) who takes his place after his death
- Bumper Robinson as shoeshine boy Leon (season 5)
- Ray Abruzzo as NYPD detective/Christine's husband Tony Giuliano (seasons 7–8)
- Mary Cadorette as reporter/Harry's girlfriend Margaret Turner (season 8)
- S. Marc Jordan as newsstand owner Jack Griffin (season 8)
- Gilbert Gottfried as prosecutor Oscar Brown (season 9)

== Casting ==
Selma Diamond died from lung cancer after the second season. Florence Halop was hired to replace Diamond as the new bailiff, but she was also a heavy smoker and similarly developed lung cancer and died after she recorded season three. She was replaced by Marsha Warfield, who played bailiff Roz Russell until the series ended in 1992.

In 1984, Shelley Hack from Charlie's Angels was hired to replace Paula Kelly and portray new public defender Christine Sullivan—who was going to be romantically involved with Judge Harry Stone (Harry Anderson). But during rehearsals, Hack and producer Reinhold Weege realized there was a problem. "What happened was the role was changed, Instead of being a funny lady, as she was in the reading, they had changed her into a straight woman. It wasn't working, The concept just didn't work and that's what I told them...What's the point if it's not working?" Hack and the producer mutually and amicably agreed she would not continue with the series. Ellen Foley was brought in for season two as a new character, public defender Billie Young. For episode 2 of season 2 (as a guest, in what was meant to be the season 2 premiere)–and from season 3 onwards (as a regular cast member)—Markie Post was hired to portray Christine Sullivan.

== Theme music ==
Every episode of Night Court opens (after a cold open) and closes with a Latin jazz-influenced, bass-heavy theme tune composed by Jack Elliott, featuring Ernie Watts on saxophone while featuring video footage of prominent New York City landmarks such as the Brooklyn Bridge and the New York County Courthouse.

Night Court's theme was used in the season-5 Family Guy episode "Bill & Peter's Bogus Journey", featuring animations of former US President Bill Clinton playing saxophone along with Secret Service musicians playing backup.

Night Court's theme was sampled for the remix to Cam'Ron's 1998 single "Horse & Carriage". It was produced by Darrell "Digga" Branch and featured Big Pun, Charli Baltimore, Wyclef Jean, and Silkk the Shocker.

Following the end credits theme music, a distinctive laugh can be heard dubbed over the vanity logo displaying producer Reinhold Weege's "Starry Night Productions". This same laugh can be heard coming from the studio audience throughout numerous seasons of Night Court. At first it was thought to be the canned laugh of voice actor Mel Blanc or even star Harry Anderson; but in fact, it was the laugh of Chuck Weege, Reinhold's father, who attended nearly all of the tapings in person (until Reinhold left the show after the sixth season).

== Scheduling ==
Premiering as a mid-season replacement for the 1983–84 television season, Night Court made its debut on Wednesday, January 4, 1984. The first season aired on Wednesday nights at 9:30 PM (after The Facts of Life and before St. Elsewhere), but ended with unimpressive ratings, in 47th place. For its second season, NBC moved the show to its powerhouse Thursday night lineup (later known as Must See TV), which also included Family Ties, Cheers, and the new comedy The Cosby Show, maintaining its 9:30 PM slot (this time, after Cheers and before Hill Street Blues), where its ratings began to rise as a result, entering the top-twenty for the first time; becoming one of the shows that helped NBC to be back on top in the Nielsen ratings. The show reached its peak during its fourth season, entering the top-ten for the first time, ending at the 7th-most watched show for the 1986–87 season. Despite keeping its Thursday night timeslot from seasons two through five, NBC attempted to air new episodes of Night Court on different nights. In the spring of 1987, NBC moved the show temporarily back to its original Wednesday night (at 9:00 PM, after Highway to Heaven) for the final four episodes of season 4. The following season, in the spring of 1988, NBC moved temporarily the show to Friday nights, airing three new episodes of season 5.

In the fall of 1988, starting with season 6, NBC moved the show to Wednesday nights, keeping its 9:00 PM slot (this time, after Unsolved Mysteries), however, ratings started to decrease, though it remained in the top-30 for its next two seasons. In the fall of 1990, NBC moved the show to Fridays at 9:00 PM, for the first 13 episodes of season 8, before moving back permanently to Wednesdays, serving now as a lead-in to the soon-to-be hit Seinfeld; despite this, the show –especially for its Friday timeslot placement– hit a new ratings low, barely making the top-50. After nine seasons, Night Court ended its run with its one-hour series finale, aired on May 13, 1992; however, a leftover episode aired on May 31.

== Episodes ==
Season	Episodes	Originally released		Rank	Rating
Season	Episodes	First released	Last released	Rank	Rating
1	13	January 4, 1984	May 31, 1984	47	15.5
2	22	September 27, 1984	May 9, 1985	20	17.6
3	22	September 26, 1985	May 8, 1986	11	20.9
4	22	October 2, 1986	May 6, 1987	7	23.2
5	22	September 17, 1987	May 12, 1988	7	20.8
6	22	October 26, 1988	May 3, 1989	21	16.9
7	24	September 27, 1989	May 2, 1990	28	14.5 (Note: Tied with The Simpsons and Doogie Howser, M.D..)
8	24	September 28, 1990	May 8, 1991	50	11.5
9	22	September 18, 1991	May 31, 1992	46	12.0

== Awards and honors ==
Night Court received a number of awards and nominations. Both Selma Diamond (in 1985) and John Larroquette (in 1988) earned Golden Globe nominations, but lost to Faye Dunaway and Rutger Hauer, respectively. Paula Kelly was nominated for an Emmy after the first season. Larroquette won four consecutive Emmys for Outstanding Supporting Actor in a Comedy Series from 1985 to 1988, before he withdrew his name from the ballot in 1989. Selma Diamond was nominated in 1985, and Anderson received three nominations in 1985, 1986, and 1987. The series received three nominations for Outstanding Comedy Series in 1985, 1987, and 1988. The series also received many awards and nominations in the areas of lighting, editing, sound mixing, and technical direction. The show was nominated for 31 Emmys, winning seven.

American Comedy Awards
Year	Category / Episode	Recipient / Nominee	Results	Ref
1990	Funniest Supporting Male Performer in a Television Series	John Larroquette	Nominated	
Casting Society of America
Year	Category / Episode	Recipient / Nominee	Results	Ref
1985	Best Casting for TV, Comedy Episodic	Eileen Mack Knight	Nominated	
1986	Best Casting for TV, Comedy Episodic	Gilda Stratton	Won	
1987	Best Casting for TV, Comedy Episodic	Harriet B. Helberg	Nominated	
Creative Arts Emmy Awards
Year	Category	Recipient	Result	Ref
1984	Outstanding Costumes in a Series ("Welcome Back, Mam")	Barbara Murphy	Nominated	
1984	Outstanding Lighting for a Series ("Bull's Baby")	John Appleroth	Nominated	
1985	Outstanding Lighting for a Series ("Billie's Valentine")	John Appleroth	Nominated	
1985	Outstanding Lighting for a Series ("Bull Gets a Kid")	Mark Buxbaum	Nominated	
1985	Outstanding Videotape Editing for a Series ("The Blizzard")	Jerry Davis	Nominated	
1986	Outstanding Costumes in a Series ("Halloween, Too")	Dan Frank, Molly Harris Campbell	Nominated	
1986	Outstanding Multi-Camera Picture Editing for a Series ("Hurricane")	Jerry Davis	Nominated	
1986	Outstanding Lighting for a Series ("Leon We Hardly Knew Ye")	George Spiro Dibie	Nominated	
1987	Outstanding Multi-Camera Picture Editing for a Series ("Her Honor – Part 1")	Jerry Davis	Won	
1987	Outstanding Costumes in a Series ("A Day in the Life")	Dan Frank, Molly Harris Campbell	Nominated	
1988	Outstanding Lighting for a Series ("Constitution – Part 2")	George Spiro Dibie	Nominated	
1989	Outstanding Sound Mixing for a Comedy Series or a Special ("The Last Temptation of Mac")	Klaus Landsberg, Allen Patapoff, Craig Porter	Won	
1989	Outstanding Technical Direction/Camera/Video for a Series ("Yet Another Day in the Life")	Rocky Danielson, Robert G. Holmes, Leigh V. Nicholson, John Repczynski, Thomas G. Tcimpidis, Jeffrey Wheat	Won	
1989	Outstanding Lighting for a Comedy Series ("Danny Got His Gun – Part 3")	Robert Berry	Nominated	
1990	Outstanding Technical Direction/Camera/Video for a Series ("Come Back To the Five and Dime, Stephen King")	Rick Caswell, Rocky Danielson, Robert G. Holmes, Leigh V. Nicholson, Thomas G. Tcimpidis, Jeffrey Wheat	Nominated	
1991	Outstanding Lighting for a Comedy Series ("Hey Harry", "F' Cryin' Out Loud", "It's A Wonderful Like..Sorta")	Charles L. Barbee	Nominated	
1992	Outstanding Lighting for a Comedy Series ("A Guy Named Phantom – Part 1")	Charles L. Barbee	Nominated	
1992	Outstanding Technical Direction/Camera/Video for a Series ("A Guy Named Phantom – Part 2")	Robert Bonas, Rick Caswell, Rocky Danielson, Robert G. Holmes, Tom Tcimpidis, Jeffrey Wheat	Nominated	
Golden Globe Awards
Year	Category	Recipient	Result	Ref
1985	Best Supporting Actress — Series, Miniseries or Motion Picture Made for Television	Selma Diamond	Nominated	
1988	Best Supporting Actor — Series, Miniseries or a Motion Picture Made for Television	John Larroquette	Nominated	
Online Film & Television Association
Year	Category	Recipient	Result	Ref
2013	Television Programs — Hall of Fame	Night Court	Won	
Primetime Emmy Awards
Year	Category	Recipient	Result	Ref
1984	Outstanding Supporting Actress in a Comedy Series	Paula Kelly	Nominated	
1985	Outstanding Comedy Series	Night Court	Nominated	
1985	Outstanding Lead Actor in a Comedy Series	Harry Anderson	Nominated	
1985	Outstanding Supporting Actor in a Comedy Series ("Dan's Parents or Married Alive")	John Larroquette	Won	
1985	Outstanding Supporting Actress in a Comedy Series	Selma Diamond	Nominated	
1986	Outstanding Lead Actor in a Comedy Series	Harry Anderson	Nominated	
1986	Outstanding Supporting Actor in a Comedy Series ("Best of Friends")	John Larroquette	Won	
1987	Outstanding Comedy Series	Night Court	Nominated	
1987	Outstanding Lead Actor in a Comedy Series	Harry Anderson	Nominated	
1987	Outstanding Supporting Actor in a Comedy Series ("Dan's Operation")	John Larroquette	Won	
1988	Outstanding Comedy Series	Night Court	Nominated	
1988	Outstanding Supporting Actor in a Comedy Series ("No Hard Feelings")	John Larroquette	Won	
Television Critics Association Awards
Year	Category	Recipient	Result	Ref
1985	Outstanding Achievement in Comedy	Night Court	Nominated	
Writers Guild of America Award
Year	Category	Recipient	Result	Ref
1985	Episodic Comedy ("Once in Love with Harry")	Reinhold Weege	Nominated	
1987	Episodic Comedy ("Best of Friends")	Howard Ostroff	Nominated	
1988	Episodic Comedy ("Contempt of Courting")	Tom Straw	Nominated	
1989	Episodic Comedy ("No Hard Feelings")	Tom Straw	Nominated	

== Syndication ==
=== United States ===
After its primary run in broadcast syndication, the series aired on A&E Network for many years. It then aired on TV Land from 2005 to 2008, then began airing on Encore Classic on December 2, 2013. From 2016 to 2022, the show aired on Laff.

As of September 2025, the series airs on the Weigel Broadcasting owned Catchy Comedy network on Saturdays. The series was also the subject of Catchy Comedy's inaugural weekend "Catchy Binge" on April 1–2, 2023. Since June 2024, it is now also broadcast on IFC, usually airing in marathons on Mondays and Tuesdays, and sometimes an episode or two is shown in the early mornings on weekends.

=== Australia ===
Network Ten first broadcast the series in the 1980s and 1990s. 7TWO began showing reruns in June 2011. Reruns are currently being shown on Foxtel Comedy Channel.

=== Canada ===
Aired weekdays on both Comedy Gold and JoyTV.

=== Germany ===
Sat.1 aired the series as Harry's wundersames Strafgericht (Harry's Miraculous Criminal Court) in 1988.

=== Italy ===
Italia 1 aired the show as Giudice di notte (Night Judge) from 1986 until 1988.

=== Spain ===
TVE aired the show as Juzgado de Guardia (Court on Duty/Call).

=== New Zealand ===
The show screened weekly on TVNZ 1 in the 1980s and 1990s, and was rerun in the late 1990s.

== Home media ==
Warner Home Video released the first three seasons on DVD in Region 1. Seasons 4–9 were released as Manufacture-on-Demand (MOD) DVDs as part of the Warner Archive Collection.

On June 13, 2023, Warner Bros. (through Studio Distribution Services) released Night Court: The Complete Series on DVD in Region 1.

DVD name	Ep. #	Release date
The Complete First Season	13	February 8, 2005
The Complete Second Season	22	February 3, 2009
The Complete Third Season	22	February 23, 2010
The Complete Fourth Season	22	March 1, 2011 (Amazon.com); September 1, 2011 (WBShop.com)
The Complete Fifth Season	22	October 25, 2011
The Complete Sixth Season	22	June 26, 2012
The Complete Seventh Season	24	November 6, 2012
The Complete Eighth Season	24	January 29, 2013
The Complete Ninth Season	22	June 11, 2013
The Complete Series	193	June 13, 2023

Special releases

DVD name	Release date	Ep. #
Television Favorites	February 28, 2006	6

The Television Favorites compilation DVD included the pilot episode, "All You Need Is Love"; both parts of the fourth-season finale, "Her Honor"; the fifth-season episodes "Death of a Bailiff" and "Who Was That Mashed Man?"; and the sixth-season episode "Fire", which marked the beginning of Harry's relationship with Christine.

Harry Anderson, Markie Post, and Charles Robinson appeared in the 30 Rock episode, "The One with the Cast of Night Court". John Larroquette is also mentioned; Harry says he had just spoken to John, which annoys Markie (who has not had recent contact with her absent former co-star) and begins an argument between them that lasts for most of the story.

== Sequel series ==
In December 2020, NBC announced it was working on a sequel series to Night Court. The show is executive produced by Melissa Rauch and Winston Rauch, with Dan Rubin writing. Larroquette returned as Fielding, while the show's central character—played by Melissa Rauch—is Abby Stone, a judge and the daughter of Harry Stone. The show is produced by Warner Bros. Television Studios for NBC. In May 2021, it was announced that NBC had given a pilot order to a sequel series. In June 2021, Ana Villafañe joined the cast for the pilot, portraying an Assistant District Attorney and Lacretta plays a bailiff Donna "Gurgs" Gurganous. In July 2021, Kapil Talwalkar joined the cast for the pilot, playing a court's clerk Neil. In September 2021, it was announced that NBC had given the production a series order. In February 2023, it was announced that following the strong reception of the first four episodes, NBC had ordered a full second season of the show. A third season of the revival series premiered on November 19, 2024. On May 9, 2025, the series was canceled after three seasons.
