= Irwin Marcus =

American psychiatrist (1919–2021)

- Marcus in 2019
- Born: March 18, 1919; Chicago, Illinois, US
- Died: October 3, 2021 (aged 102)
- Education: University of Illinois (M.D.)
- Spouses: Dorothy Elrod (died 1992) Angela Hill (m. 2001)
- Children: 3
- Medical career
- Profession: Psychiatrist
- Field: Psychiatry and Psychoanalysis
- Institutions: Cook County Hospital; Columbia University; Tulane University School of Medicine; LSU School of Medicine; New Orleans Psychoanalytic Institute

Irwin M. Marcus (March 18, 1919 – October 3, 2021) was an American board certified psychiatrist, neurologist, psychoanalyst, medical educator, visual artist, and sculptor. He was a practicing psychiatrist, sex therapist, marriage counselor, psychoanalyst, child psychiatrist, and family counselor for over six decades. Marcus started the Child Psychiatry Program at Tulane University School of Medicine in 1952, he was a Founder and President of the New Orleans Psychoanalytic Institute, Emeritus Professor of Clinical Psychiatry at LSU School of Medicine, and was considered a psychoanalytic scholar.

In June 2012, the American Academy of Child and Adolescent Psychiatry named Marcus a Distinguished and Life Member. He was also a Distinguished Life Fellow of the American Psychiatric Association and a Fellow of the American College of Physicians.

== Personal life ==
Marcus was married to Dorothy Elrod, sister of Chicago politician and judge Richard Elrod. He was then married to former journalist Angela Hill.

He turned 100 in March 2019, and died on October 3, 2021, at the age of 102.

== Military service ==
Marcus was a World War II veteran. The day after the attack on Pearl Harbor, he enlisted in the United States Army as a neurologist and psychiatrist.

== Publications ==
Marcus's writings are reflected in his authorship or co-authorship in hundreds of published medical articles, chapters and books on various aspects of sex therapy, marriage counseling, child psychiatry, family counseling, psychoanalysis and medical education, as well as ethical, socio-economic and philosophic discussions in these fields.

- Marcus, Irwin M. (2004). Why Men Have Affairs?. New Orleans: Bon Temps Press. ISBN 978-0975359204. LCCN 2004104195. OCLC 56315166.
- Marcus, Irwin M.; Francis, John J. (1979). La masturbazione [Masturbation: From infancy to senescence] (in Italian). Translated by Maura Pizzorno. Milano: Feltrinelli. OCLC 450626870.
- Marcus, Irwin M.; Francis, John J. (1975). Masturbation: From infancy to senescence. New York: International Universities Press. ISBN 978-0823631506. LCCN 73016855. OCLC 1176970.
- Marcus, Irwin M. (1972). Currents in Psychoanalysis. New York: International Universities Press. ISBN 978-0823611058. LCCN 74139116. OCLC 309230.
- Marcus, Irwin M. (1960). An interdisciplinary approach to accident patterns in children. Lafayette, IN: Child Development Publications of the Society for Research in Child Development. LCCN 60002550. OCLC 1082420.
- Newton, Niles (1957). Gyorgy, Paul; Marcus, Irwin M.; Montgomery, Thaddeus L. (eds.). The Family Book of Child Care. New York: Published by Harper & Row. ASIN B0006AU6L2. LCCN 55008058. OCLC 1347503.
- Marcus, Irwin M. (1956). Psychoanalytic Group Therapy with Fathers of Emotionally Disturbed Preschool Children. New Orleans: Tulane University. ASIN B000K7SLIG.
