= Harry Anderson =

American actor, comedian, and magician (1952–2018)

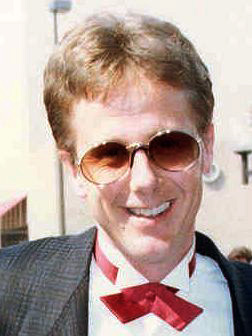
- Anderson at the 1988 Emmy Awards
- Born: Harry Laverne Anderson; October 14, 1952; Newport, Rhode Island, U.S.
- Died: April 16, 2018 (aged 65); Asheville, North Carolina, U.S.
- Education: Fullerton College
- Occupations: Actor; comedian; magician
- Years active: 1978–2014
- Spouses: Leslie Pollack (m. 1977; div. 1999); Elizabeth Morgan (m. 2000)
- Children: 2

Harry Laverne Anderson (October 14, 1952 – April 16, 2018) was an American actor, comedian, and magician. He is best known for his role as Judge Harold "Harry" T. Stone on the NBC sitcom Night Court (1984–1992). He later played Dave Barry on the CBS sitcom Dave's World (1993–1997).

In addition to eight appearances on Saturday Night Live between 1981 and 1985, Anderson had a recurring guest role as con man Harry "The Hat" Gittes on Cheers (1982–1993). He toured extensively as a magician, and did several magic/comedy shows for broadcast, including Harry Anderson's Sideshow (1987). He played Richie Tozier in the 1990 miniseries It, based on the Stephen King novel of the same name.

== Early life ==
Anderson was born October 14, 1952, in Newport, Rhode Island. He spent much of his youth performing magic on the streets of Chicago, New York, St. Louis and New Orleans before landing in California at the age of 16. After moving to Los Angeles, he joined the Dante Magic Club and worked as a street magician in San Francisco when he was 17. He attended Buena Park High School before graduating from North Hollywood High School in 1970 as class valedictorian. After high school, he attended Fullerton College. From 1971 to 1976, he lived in Ashland, Oregon, performing magic and working with the Oregon Shakespeare Festival.

== Career ==
Anderson's appearances on Saturday Night Live led to his role as Harry "The Hat" Gittes on several episodes of the television sitcom Cheers from 1982 to 1993, and eventually his best known role as Judge Harry Stone on the sitcom Night Court from 1984 to 1992. He went on to appear in other television specials and shows, including 12 appearances on The Tonight Show Starring Johnny Carson, and hosted an episode of Saturday Night Live on the show's tenth season.

As a magician, Anderson toured extensively and performed in comedy/magic shows for clubs and broadcast, including Harry Anderson's Sideshow in 1987. In 1990, he starred in the television adaptation of Stephen King's It as the adult Richie Tozier. From 1993 to 1997, he starred in the television sitcom Dave's World, based loosely on the life and columns of humorist Dave Barry.

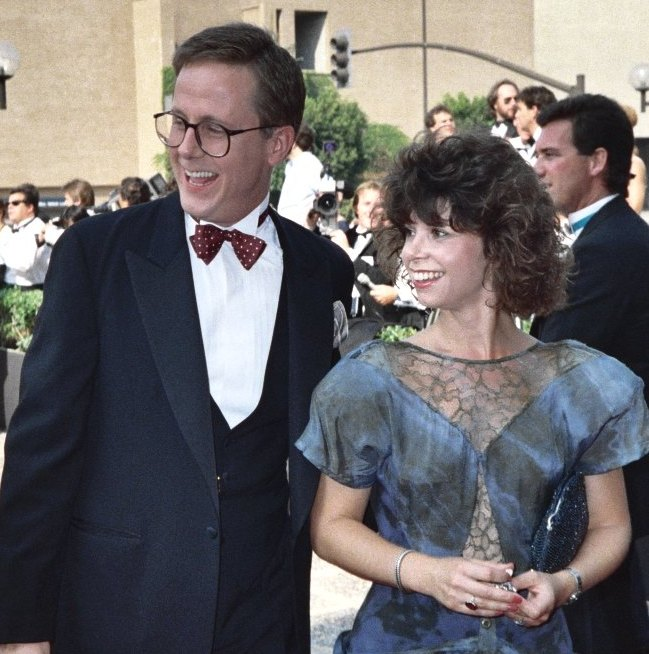
Anderson with his first wife, Leslie Pollack, at the 39th Primetime Emmy Awards, September 1987

Together with longtime friend Turk Pipkin, Anderson wrote a book called Games You Can't Lose: A Guide for Suckers, a collection of gags, cons, tricks and scams. First published in 1989 (ISBN 978-1-58080-086-0, 2001 reprint), it also contains a survey of "Games You Can't Win" told from an insider's perspective. He appeared with Criss Angel in a TV special called The Science of Magic, later released on DVD.

On July 15, 2000, Anderson hosted the pilot for a potential revival of the classic panel game show What's My Line? featuring Catherine Bell, Bryan Cranston, Betty White and Al Franken as the four panelists for CBS primetime, but was later turned down in favor of Survivor.

He moved from Pasadena, California, to New Orleans in 2002. In 2002, he and his second wife, Elizabeth, whom he met in New Orleans while she was bartending, opened a small shop in the French Quarter named "Spade & Archer Curiosities by Appointment" (later named "Sideshow"), selling various "magic, curiosities, and apocrypha".

In 2005, Anderson opened a nightclub in the French Quarter, Oswald's Speakeasy, at 1331 Decatur Street at the corner of Esplanade Avenue. He performed a one-man show there called Wise Guy.

Anderson appeared in Hexing a Hurricane, a documentary about the first six months in New Orleans after Hurricane Katrina. He and his wife sold Oswald's Speakeasy in October 2006. He continued to present his evening show Wise Guy, originally developed for his theater in New Orleans.

In November 2008, Anderson played himself on an episode of 30 Rock, along with fellow former Night Court cast members Markie Post and Charles Robinson.

In his final years, Anderson appeared in television comedy series such as Comedy Bang! Bang! (2013) and Gotham Comedy Live (2014). His final film portrayal was as Professor Kaman in the 2014 Christian drama film A Matter of Faith.

== Personal life ==
Anderson was a longtime fan of singer Mel Tormé, and his character Judge Stone on Night Court was also a Tormé fan; the singer appeared on the sitcom six times. Night Court creator Reinhold Weege said that Anderson and his character both being Tormé fans was completely coincidental. Anderson was among those who delivered eulogies at the singer's funeral in 1999.

Anderson was married twice. In 1977, he married Leslie Pollack (b. 1953); they had two children, a daughter, Eva Fay Anderson, and a son, Dashiell Anderson, before divorcing in 1999. In 2000, he married Elizabeth Morgan (b. 1973). In 2006, Anderson and his wife moved from New Orleans to Asheville, North Carolina.

== Illness and death ==
In late January 2018, Anderson had a bout of influenza and subsequently suffered several strokes. On April 16, 2018, at age 65, he died in his sleep of a stroke due to influenza and heart disease at his home in Asheville, North Carolina.

== Filmography ==
=== Film ===
Year	Title	Role	Notes
1982	The Escape Artist	Harry Masters	
1988	She's Having a Baby	Himself	Uncredited
2006	Hexing a Hurricane	Himself	Documentary
2014	A Matter of Faith	Professor Kaman	Final film role

=== Television ===
Year(s)	Title	Role	Notes
1981–1985	Saturday Night Live	Himself	8 episodes
1982–1993	Cheers	Harry "The Hat" Gittes	6 episodes
1984–1992	Night Court	Judge Harold "Harry" T. Stone	Main role; 193 episodes; also occasional director and writer Nominated – Primetime Emmy Award for Outstanding Lead Actor in a Comedy Series (1984–86)
1985	Tales from the Darkside	Leon	Episode: "All a Clone by the Telephone"
1986	Vanishing America	Dog Owner	Short television film
1988	Tanner '88	Billy Ridenhour	2 episodes
1988	Spies, Lies & Naked Thighs	Freddie	Television film
1988	D.C. Follies	Himself	Episode: "Nixon Hawks the Watergate Tapes for $29.99"
1988	The Absent-Minded Professor	Professor Henry Crawford	Television film (remake)
1990	Mother Goose Rock 'n' Rhyme	Peter Piper	Television film
1990	It	Richie Tozier	Miniseries
1990	Tales from the Crypt	Jim Korman	Episode: "Korman's Kalamity"
1992	Parker Lewis Can't Lose	Ronny Ray Rasmussen	Episode: "Glory Daze"
1993–1997	Dave's World	Dave Barry	98 episodes
1994	Hearts Afire	Dave Barry	Episode: "Sleepless in a Small Town"
1996	Night Stand with Dick Dietrick	Harry	Episode: "UFO Mother Show"
1996	The John Larroquette Show	Dr. Gates	Episode: "Cosmetic Perjury"
1996	Harvey	Elwood P. Dowd	Television film (remake)
1997	Lois & Clark: The New Adventures of Superman	Dr. Klaus "Fat Head" Mensa	Episode: "The Family Hour"
1998	Noddy	Jack Fable	Episode: "The Magic Show"
2002	Son of the Beach	Bull Cracker	Episode: "The Long Hot Johnson"
2008	30 Rock	Himself	Episode: "The One with the Cast of Night Court"
2013	Comedy Bang! Bang!	Himself	Episode: "Rainn Wilson Wears a Short Sleeved Plaid Shirt & Colorful Sneakers"
2014	Gotham Comedy Live	Himself	Episode: "Harry Anderson"

=== Video game ===
Year	Title	Voice
1997	Nightmare Ned	Graveyard Shadow Creature / Grampa Ted Needlemeyer

Books, magazines, and publications
Year	Title	Info	ISBN	Source
1982	Wenii: The Intentional Confusers' Magazine	A spoof on the magic magazine Genii: The Conjurers' Magazine		
1989	Harry Anderson's Games You Can't Lose: A Guide for Suckers		ISBN 978-0671647278	
1993	Harry Anderson: Wise Guy from the Street to the Screen		ISBN 978-0915181254	
2001	Games You Can't Lose: A Guide for Suckers		ISBN 978-1580800860	
