= Garland Robinette =

American broadcaster

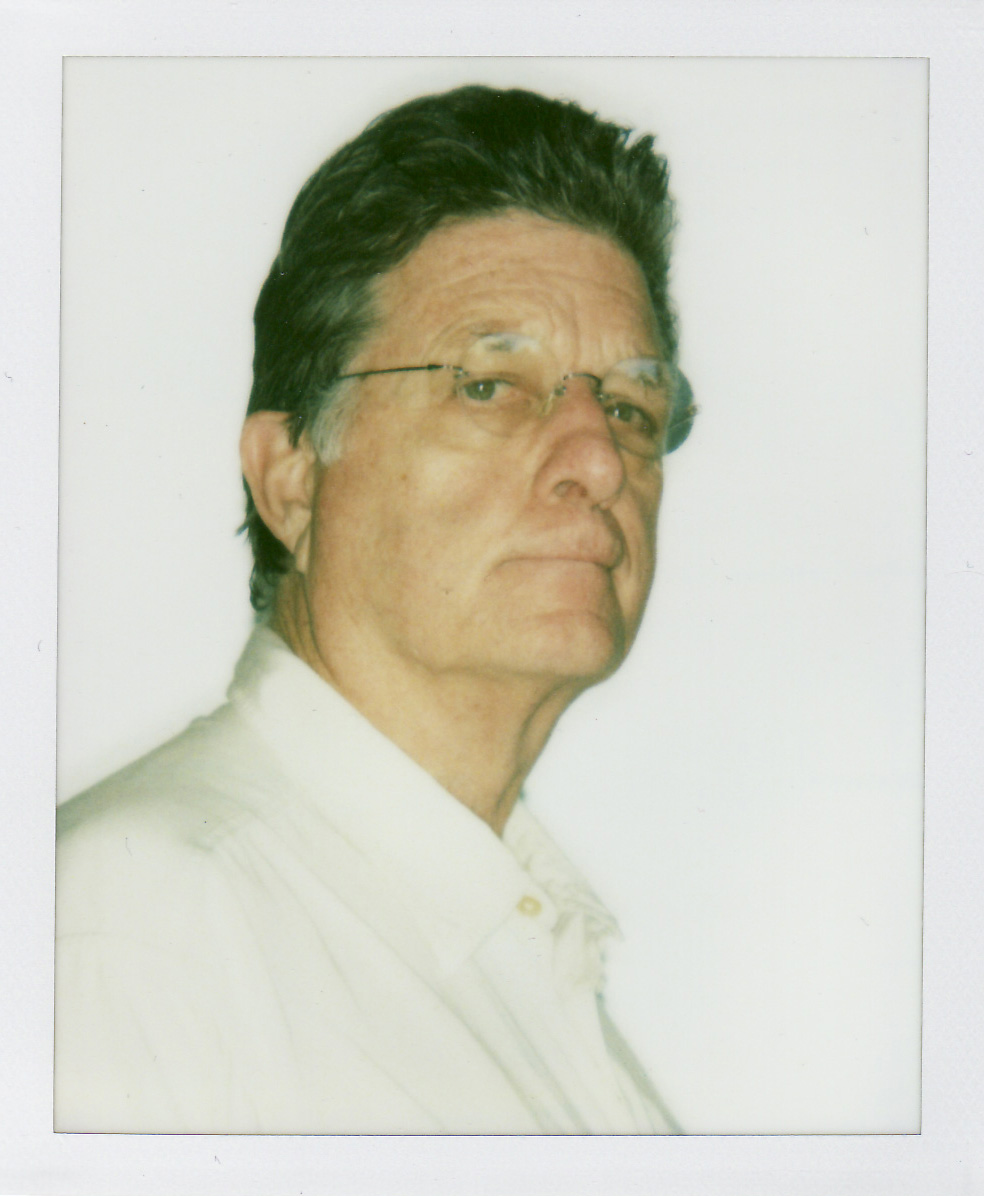
- Garland Robinette in December 2008 by Blake Nelson Boyd.
- Born: Charles Garland Robinette; August 21, 1943 (age 83); Boutte, Louisiana, U.S.
- Education: New Orleans Academy of Fine Arts
- Known for: Radio host, television news anchor, visual artist
- Spouses: Susan Derveloy (div. 1977) Angela Hill (m. 1978; div. 1987) Debra Bresler (m. 1988, divorced) Nancy Halstead Rhett (m. 1994)

Charles Garland Robinette (born August 21, 1943) is a journalist in the New Orleans area. He was recently the host of "The Think Tank" on New Orleans radio station WWL (AM).

Robinette was born in Boutte, Louisiana. He is a Hahnville High School alum and a U.S. Navy veteran of the Vietnam War. He studied at the New Orleans Academy of Fine Arts and created the official poster for the 2011 New Orleans Jazz and Heritage Festival.

He was a news anchor and investigative reporter on New Orleans TV station WWL-TV Channel 4 for twenty years (August 1970 until August 8, 1990). After leaving the TV station, Robinette served as head of public relations for Freeport-McMoRan in New Orleans before starting his own firm. He returned to the media in 2005 on WWL (AM) as a fill-in for David Tyree, a popular host stricken with cancer. The position became permanent when Tyree succumbed several weeks after Hurricane Katrina.

== Radio show ==
Robinette came to national attention with Hurricane Katrina in 2005. As the storm made landfall radio station WWL was the only broadcast media in New Orleans able to continue operating during the disaster. Robinette was broadcasting from a hastily thrown together set-up in a closet of the WWL studios after the high rise building windows blew out. In the days between the time when the hurricane hit New Orleans and when outside help arrived, Robinette's broadcasts were an important information source for those able to hear radio broadcasts in the Greater New Orleans area. On September 2, 2005, Robinette conducted the famous interview with Mayor Ray Nagin where the mayor urged those in the Federal Government who had been promising but not delivering aid to "get off your asses".

Robinette is one of the interview subjects in When the Levees Broke, the 2006 Spike Lee documentary about the effect of Hurricane Katrina on New Orleans. He also appears alongside Angela Hill, his former coanchor and ex-wife, in Hexing A Hurricane, a documentary about the first six months in New Orleans after Hurricane Katrina.

Garland Robinette retired from WWL radio in July 2017 after a 12-year run, to focus on painting.
