= Angela Hill (journalist) =

American journalist

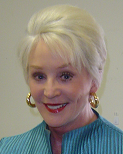
- Born: March 28, 1949 (age 77); Portland, Maine
- Education: University of Texas at Austin (B.S.)
- Occupation: Journalist
- Spouse(s): Charles Garland Robinette (m. 1978; div. 1987) Darrell Eugene Wolfley (m. 1988; div. 1995) Irwin Marcus

Angela Hill (born March 28, 1949) is an American journalist.

== Biography ==
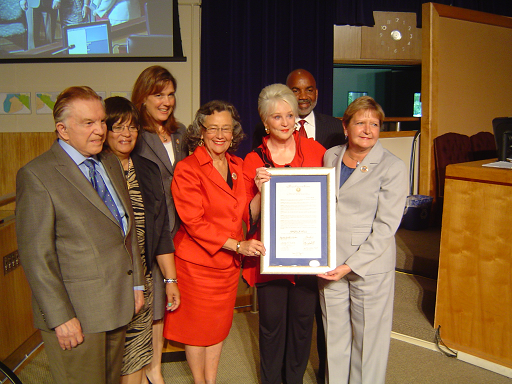
New Orleans City Council proclamation presented to Hill on June 6, 2013. Pictured left to right: Dr. Irwin Marcus, Councilmember Cynthia Hedge-Morrell, Councilmember Kristin Gisleson Palmer, Council President and Councilmember-at-Large Jackie Clarkson, Hill, Councilmember James Austin Gray II, and Councilmember Susan G. Guidry.

Angela Hill grew up in Corpus Christi, Texas and graduated from the University of Texas at Austin in 1972 with a Bachelor of Arts degree in journalism. Hill has been married three times. Her first marriage was to Charles Garland Robinette, whom she married in 1978. Ten years later, they announced they had divorced. In 1988 Hill married Dr. Darrell Wolfley. They were divorced on April 3, 1995. In 1996, Hill met Dr. Irwin Marcus, whom she married in 2001.

Prior to moving to New Orleans, she worked as an anchor and assistant news director at then-CBS affiliate KGBT-TV in Harlingen, Texas. In April 1975, Angela Hill was hired as the consumer reporter for WWL-TV, the CBS affiliate in New Orleans, Louisiana, USA. In September 1975, Hill became the first female anchor at WWL-TV. Between 1975 and 2013, she co-anchored the 5 PM, 6 PM and 10 PM newscasts. For several years she was paired with anchor Garland Robinette, to whom she was married from 1978 to 1987. During Hill's 38-year career at WWL-TV, she traveled to Paris, London, Beirut, China, Africa and Rome where she would deliver the news and produce documentaries. In 1984, she played the role of a reporter in the film Tightrope.

In 1989, Angela Hill created and hosted the Angela Show, a daily talk show. The Angela Show started in 1989 and ended in 1996. The Angela Show aired 1,668 shows. Hill's interviewees included notable actors, authors, fashion designers, musicians, and politicians including Danny Thomas, Oprah Winfrey, Anne Rice, Bill Clinton, Cokie Roberts, Lindy Boggs, Dave Thomas, Willie Nelson, Tommy Hilfiger, Roberta Flack, John Goodman, and Oscar de la Renta.

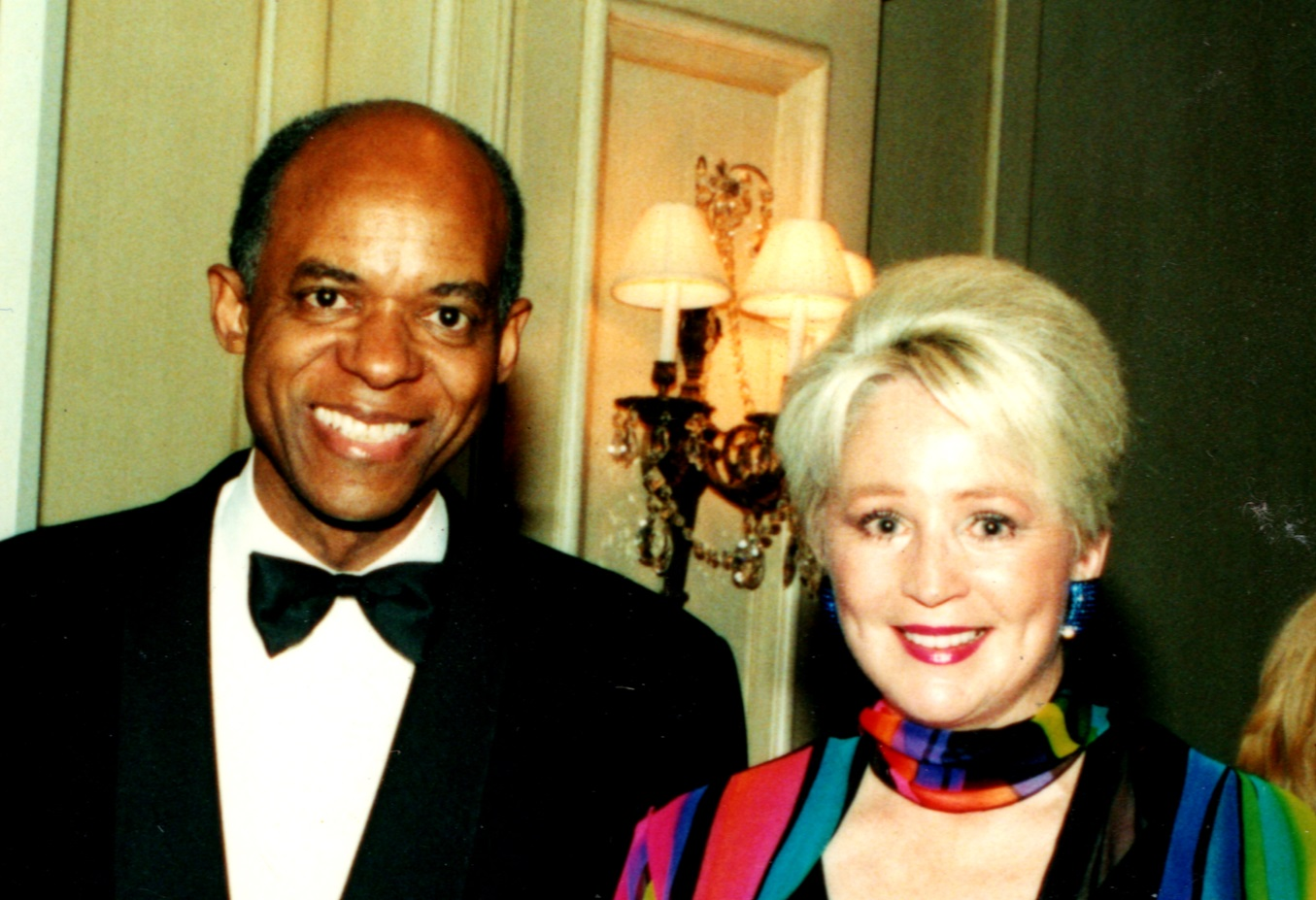
Congressman William Jefferson with Hill, 2002.

Angela Hill has been nationally recognized for her contributions as an American journalist. She has been awarded the following national awards: Gabriel Award, Gracie Awards and Freedoms Foundation Award.

During her career as an American journalist, Angela Hill produced documentaries on China, in 1979, and the Golden Fleece Awards, in 1978.

On June 6, 2013, the New Orleans City Council honored Angela Hill for more than 35 years of service in New Orleans, Louisiana.

== Awards ==
2014 NVT Louisiana Star Performer Award, The NOLA Voice Talent Foundation

2012 Golden Mike Award, Louisiana Association of Broadcasters
2010 Regional Edward R. Murrow
Inducted into the New Orleans Broadcasting Hall of Fame
Lifetime Achievement Award, Press Club of New Orleans
Gabriel Award
Gracie Award
Freedoms Foundation Award
