= Reinhold Weege =

American television producer (1949–2012)

- Born: December 23, 1949; Chicago, Illinois, U.S.
- Died: December 1, 2012 (aged 62); La Jolla, California, U.S.
- Occupation(s): Writer, director, producer

Reinhold Charles Weege (December 23, 1949 – December 1, 2012) was an American television writer, producer and director.

== Career ==
Weege wrote for several television series, including Barney Miller and M*A*S*H. In 1981, he created the very short-lived legal sitcom Park Place. In 1984, he created the sitcom Night Court, which ran for nine seasons on NBC. Weege owned Starry Night Productions, which produced Night Court until 1989, when Weege left the series after six seasons. He produced the unsold sitcom pilot Nikki and Alexander in 1989. He was nominated for four Emmy Awards during his career, one for Barney Miller and three for Night Court.

== Death ==
Weege died of natural causes in La Jolla, California, on December 1, 2012, at the age of 62. Actor John Larroquette, who played Night Court prosecutor Dan Fielding, paid tribute to Weege in a Twitter post:

"In life there are those who impact us with such force everything changes. Reinhold Weege was that in mine. May he truly rest in peace."
