= 17th Ward of New Orleans =

Coordinates: 29.906928°N 90.054453°W

Map of ward boundary

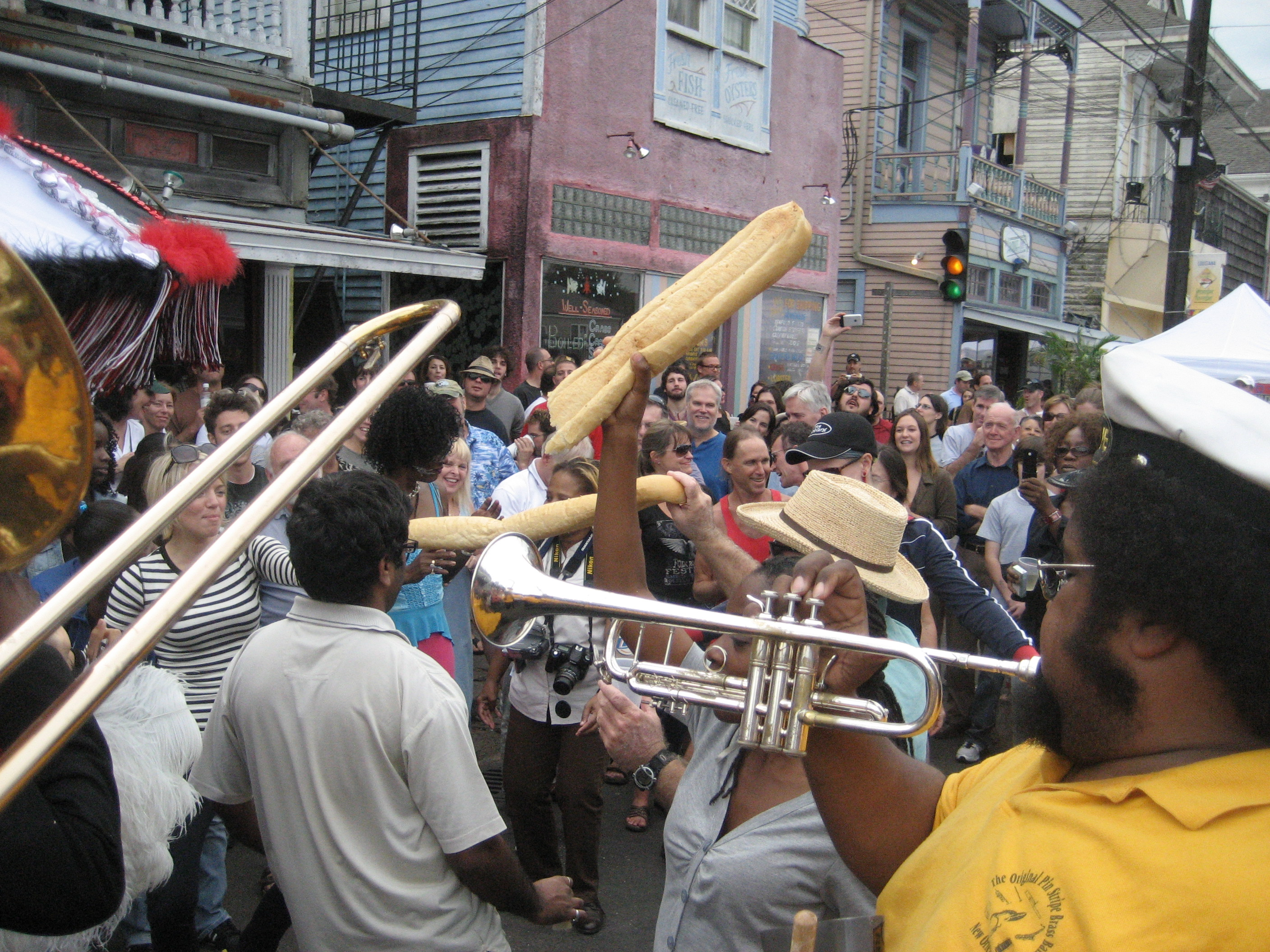
Celebrating Po-Boy Fest on Oak Street

The 17th Ward is one of the 17 wards of New Orleans, a section of the city of New Orleans, Louisiana. The 17th Ward, along with the 16th, was formed when the city of New Orleans annexed city of Carrollton in 1870.

== Boundaries ==
The ward stretches from the Mississippi River to Lake Pontchartrain. It is the farthest up-river ward of the city; the upper (western) boundary is Jefferson Parish, Louisiana. The lower boundary extends from the riverfront along Carrollton Avenue (across which is the 16th Ward) to the intersection of I-10. This was formerly the route of the New Basin Canal, the original ward boundary. Across I-10 here is the 3rd Ward. Continuing back along the former Canal route, the boundary north of I-10 becomes Pontchartrain Boulevard, across which is the 4th Ward, and north to the lakefront.

== History ==
The area closer to the Riverfront was originally the upper half of the town of Carrollton, Louisiana, annexed to New Orleans in 1874 along with the 16th Ward. The boundary between the Ward and Jefferson Parish from Metairie Ridge back is the 17th Street Canal.

== Landmarks and neighborhoods ==
Going roughly from the river to the lake, the 17th Ward includes the Carrollton Riverbend area, Upper or West Carrollton with the noted Oak Street commercial area, the Leonidas neighborhood, Marsalis Harmony Park at Carrollton and Claiborne, Northwest Carrollton, Hollygrove and Dixon neighborhoods (known for producing a number of rap music artists, such as Lil Wayne, Mack Maine, Fiend, and DJ Hollygrove). Country Club Gardens the Longue Vue House and Gardens, Metairie Cemetery, Lakewood neighborhood, the West End neighborhood, West End Park—long famous for the collection of seafood restaurants—Orleans Marina and the Municipal Yacht Harbor.

== Hurricane Katrina ==
In 2005, Hurricane Katrina struck the city, and a disastrous break in the canal levee flooded much of the city; see: Effect of Hurricane Katrina on New Orleans.
