= Lakeshore/Lake Vista, New Orleans =

Lakeshore/Lake Vista
- New Orleans Neighborhood
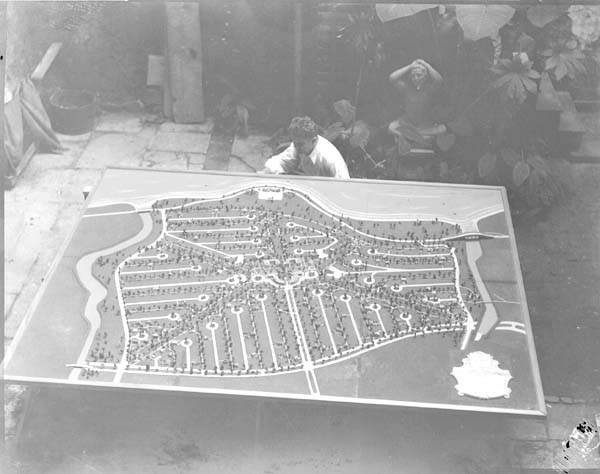
- WPA relief map of Lake Vista, 1936
- Interactive map of Lakeshore/Lake Vista
- Coordinates: 30°01′22″N 90°05′54″W
- Country: United States
- State: Louisiana
- City: New Orleans
- Planning District: District 5, Lakeview District

Area
  - Total: 19.64 sq mi (50.9 km^{2})
  - Land: 1.12 sq mi (2.9 km^{2})
  - Water: 18.52 sq mi (48.0 km^{2})
- Elevation: 0 ft (0 m)

Population (2019)
  - Total: 3,546
  - Density: 3,170/sq mi (1,220/km^{2})
- Time zone: UTC-6 (CST)
  - Summer (DST): UTC-5 (CDT)
- Area code: 504

Lakeshore/Lake Vista is a neighborhood of the city of New Orleans, Louisiana. A subdistrict of the Lakeview District Area, its boundaries as defined by the City Planning Commission are: Lake Pontchartrain to the north, Bayou St. John to the east, Allen Toussaint Boulevard to the south and Pontchartrain Boulevard and the New Basin Canal to the west. The neighborhood is composed of the Lakeshore and Lake Vista subdivisions, built on land reclaimed from Lake Pontchartrain. The Lakefront is a term sometimes used to name the larger neighborhood created by the Orleans Levee Board's land reclamation initiative in early 20th century New Orleans; it includes Lakeshore and Lake Vista, as well as Lakeshore Drive and the lakefront park system, the University of New Orleans, Lake Terrace, and Lake Oaks.

== History ==
While Lakeshore and Lake Vista are among New Orleans' newer neighborhoods, the area includes the 18th century Old Spanish Fort, whose origins predate the official founding of the city.

The circa 1939 Lake Vista neighborhood is an example of the Garden City movement, and is preferred by its residents for its superblock design devoid of thru-streets and possessing separate, non-intersecting vehicular and pedestrian networks.

Lakeshore and Lake Vista lie on land reclaimed from the shallows of Lake Pontchartrain in the early 20th century. Soil was dredged from the lake and a seawall constructed in a project started by the Orleans Levee Board in the 1920s and continued by the Works Progress Administration during the Great Depression. Most of the buildings in this predominantly residential district were not built until after World War II.

After Hurricane Katrina in 2005, while some homes and businesses flooded (especially those on and near Robert E. Lee Boulevard) the majority of the section - like the majority of the Lakefront - escaped the disastrous post-Katrina flooding of New Orleans, by virtue of the higher elevation of this man-made land. Post-Katrina, the Lakefront appeared as a slender, curiously undamaged and almost wholly recovered zone adjacent to the far lower-lying and hard-hit Lakeview and Gentilly neighborhoods on the other side of Robert E. Lee Boulevard (now Allen Toussaint Boulevard).

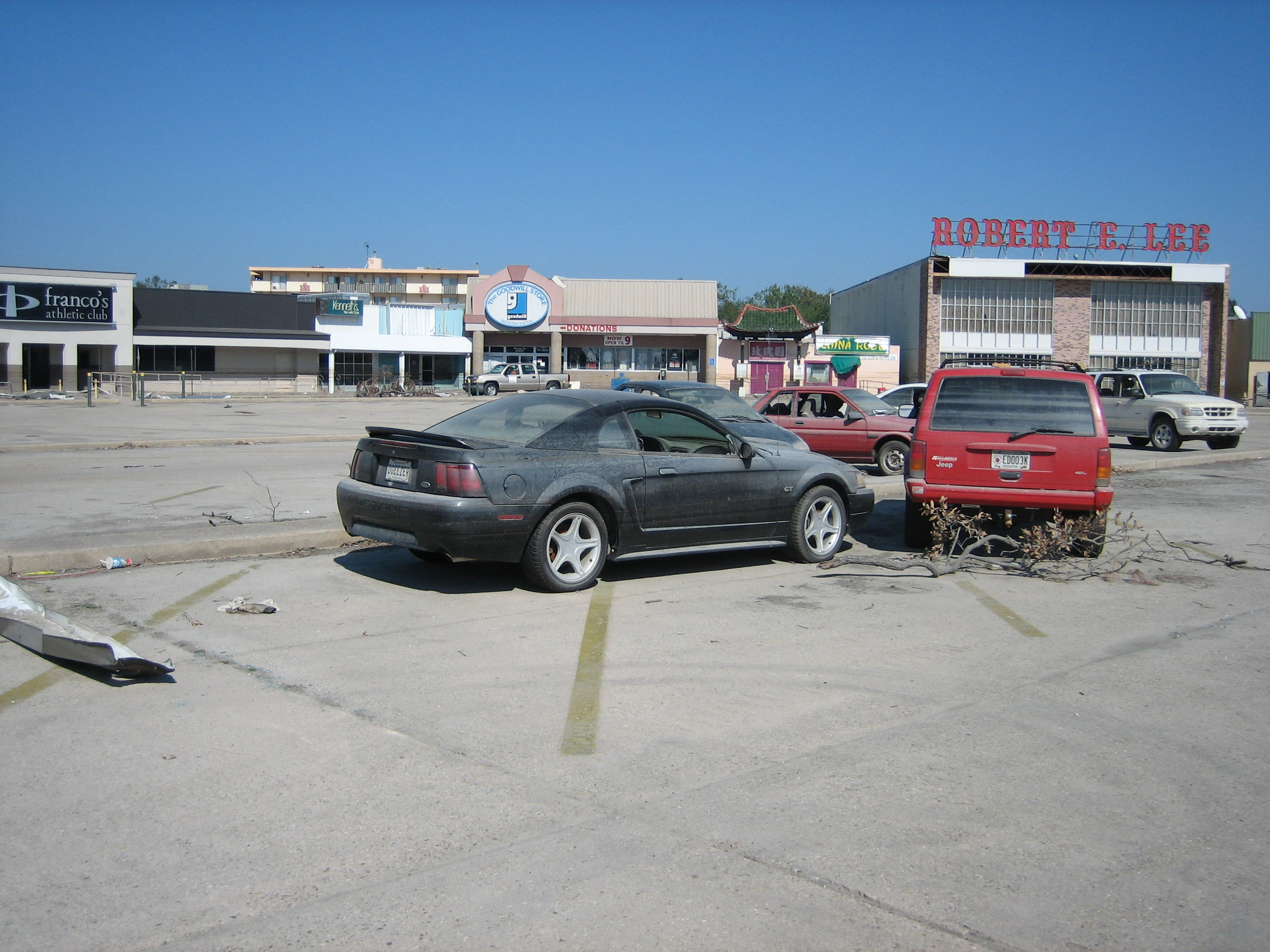
The Robert E. Lee strip mall at the edge of Lakeshore was flooded by the Hurricane Katrina-induced levee failures

== Geography ==
Lakeshore/Lake Vista is located at 30°01′22″N 90°05′54″W and has an elevation of 0 feet (0.0 m). According to the United States Census Bureau, the district has a total area of 19.64 square miles (50.9 km^{2}). 1.12 square miles (2.9 km^{2}) of which is land and 18.52 square miles (48.0 km^{2}) (94.3%) of which is water.

The area between the New Basin Canal and the Orleans Canal is the Lakeshore neighborhood, divided into "Lakeshore West" and "Lakeshore East" by Canal Boulevard. The Robert E. Lee strip mall occupies the southwest corner of Lakeshore West.

East of the Orleans Canal and the linear park along its banks is the Lake Vista neighborhood. Lake Vista was designed along Garden City lines. The entire subdivision is one superblock; that is, arterial streets (e.g., Allen Toussaint Boulevard, Lakeshore Drive, Marconi) pass around but not through it. All interior streets terminate in culs-de-sac. A separate, all-pedestrian system of circulation is composed of small lanes, all of which flow into axial, pedestrian-only parkways of varying length that, in turn, meet at the center of the development. The original vision for Lake Vista sought to support the pedestrian circulation network as the primary means of movement within the neighborhood by encouraging house designs where the house's front faced either the lane or the parkway; elevations on the vehicular street side were secondary in importance and typically hosted garages or carports. Though some of the original houses in Lake Vista retain this aspect, most newer residential construction has followed a more conventional design, with the front of the house facing the street. Also envisioned for Lake Vista was a town center in the middle of the development, complete with a public school, shops and apartments. Though some apartments were built, without frontage on a major thoroughfare the Streamline Moderne-style commercial structure commissioned for the town center struggled; today the building houses small offices. While the projected public school was never realized, St. Pius X Catholic Church and School were constructed, and today join Lake Vista United Methodist Church and the historic Lake Vista commercial building at the heart of the neighborhood.

Though Lake Vista and the other Lakefront neighborhoods of Lakeshore, Lake Terrace and Lake Oaks contain numerous fine examples of mid-20th century modernism, no local or national historic district has been established to bring attention to this unique architectural inventory, or to the noteworthy overall design of New Orleans' Lakefront neighborhood. Lacking local historic district designation to protect the existing built environment from unwarranted demolitions, the mid-20th century architectural fabric of the Lakefront is being slowly eroded as existing residential structures are torn down to accommodate new construction.

=== Adjacent Neighborhoods ===
- Lake Pontchartrain (north)
- Lake Terrace/Lake Oaks (east)
- City Park (south)
- Lakeview (south)
- West End (west)

=== Boundaries ===
The City Planning Commission defines the boundaries of Lakeshore/Lake Vista as these streets: Lake Pontchartrain, Bayou St. John, Allen Toussaint Boulevard, Pontchartrain Boulevard and the New Basin Canal.

== Demographics ==
According to the American Community Survey of 2019, there were 3,546 people, 1,431 households, and 916 families residing in the neighborhood. 36.1% of residents have a graduate or professional degree.

== Friendships towns ==
Malaysia: Kuala Kubu Baru, Malaysia

== See also ==
- New Orleans neighborhoods
