= West End, New Orleans =

West End
- New Orleans neighborhood
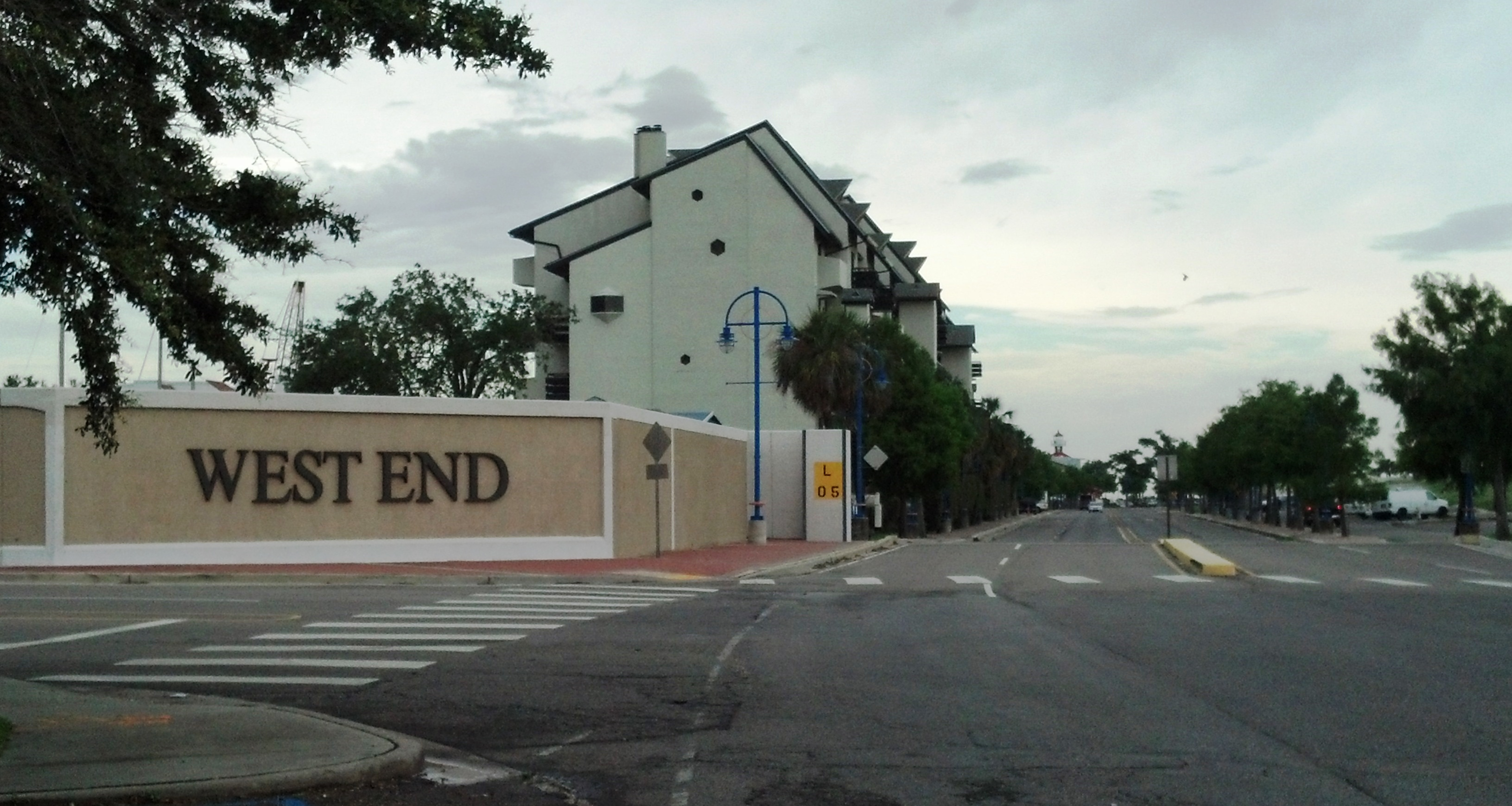
- West End - New Orleans, Louisiana
- Interactive map of West End
- Coordinates: 30°00′44″N 90°07′05″W
- Country: United States
- State: Louisiana
- City: New Orleans
- Planning District: District 5, Lakeview District

Area
  - Total: 5.64 sq mi (14.6 km^{2})
  - Land: 0.70 sq mi (1.8 km^{2})
  - Water: 4.94 sq mi (12.8 km^{2})
- Elevation: 0 ft (0 m)

Population (2019)
  - Total: 3,930
  - Density: 5,600/sq mi (2,200/km^{2})
- Time zone: UTC−6 (CST)
  - Summer (DST): UTC−5 (CDT)
- Area code: 504

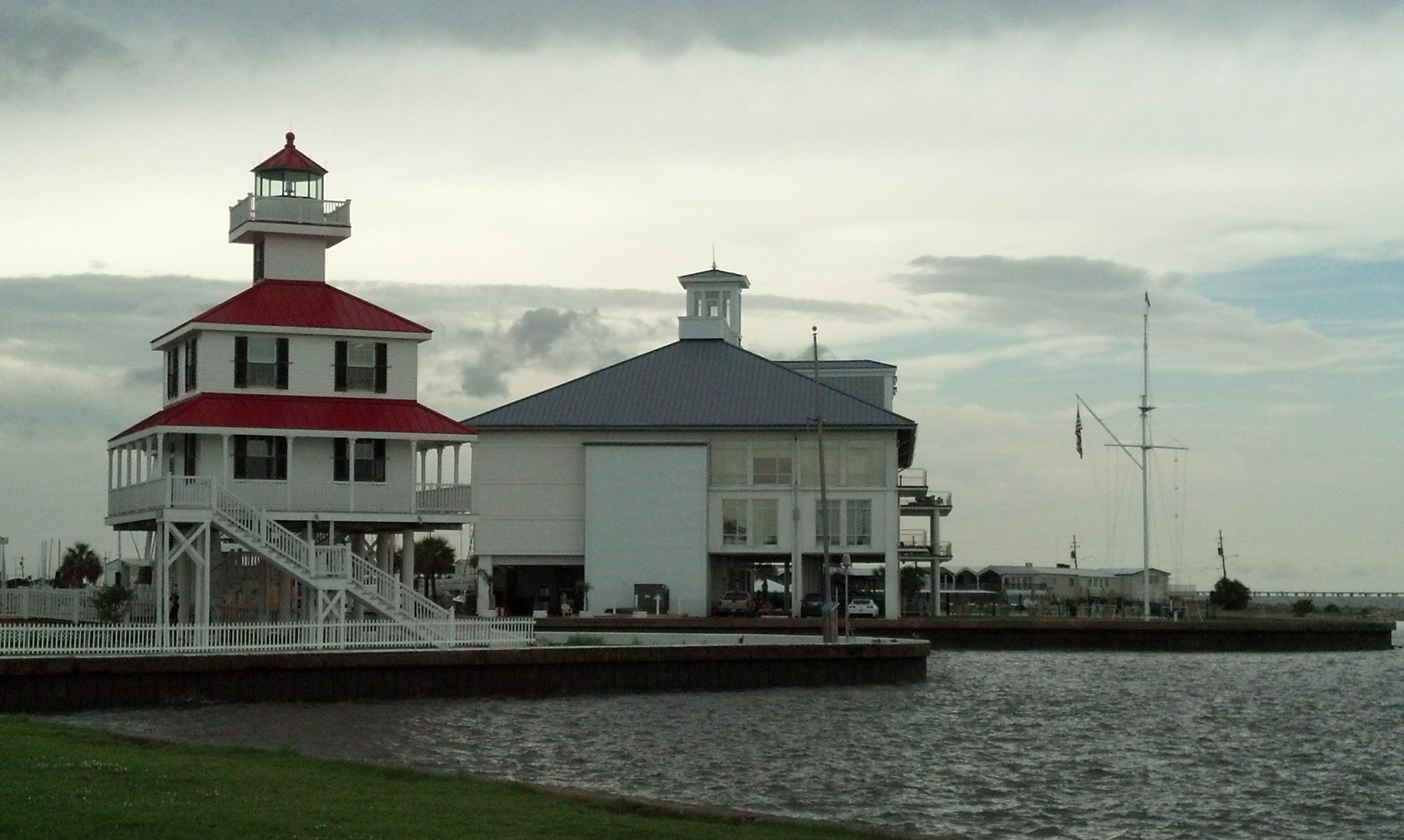
New Canal Lighthouse and Southern Yacht Club

West End (also referred to as West Lakeview) is a neighborhood of the city of New Orleans. A subdistrict of the Lakeview District Area, its boundaries as defined by the City Planning Commission are: Lake Pontchartrain to the north, the New Basin Canal and Pontchartrain Boulevard to the east, Veterans Boulevard to the south, and the 17th Street Canal to the west. The area was largely built on land reclaimed from Lake Pontchartrain. It is a commercial seafood and recreational boating hub for the city and has been known for its seafood restaurants. In recent years, the area has seen large condominium-complex developments built which overlook the Lake, marinas, and centrally located 30-acre (120,000 m^{2}) West End Park.

The majority of the land and marinas at West End are managed by the New Orleans Municipal Yacht Harbor Management Corporation, a public-benefit corporation of the City of New Orleans, with much of it leased to private interests and individuals.

The area is immediately north of the site of the levee failure on the 17th Street Canal during Hurricane Katrina, which was a primary cause of the inundation and devastation of many neighborhoods in New Orleans. Located outside of the flood walls, West End experienced some severe damage, but it was limited to heavy winds and high water destroying the restaurants and music clubs built on piers over the lake. Because West End was developed above sea level, the neighborhood only flooded due to the storm surge coming in from Lake Pontchartrain. After the water rapidly receded, the location became a staging area for the US Coast Guard, the Louisiana National Guard, and the Massachusetts National Guard, who were conducting rescues of stranded residents.

Two yacht club facilities, the New Orleans Yacht Club and Southern Yacht Club, along with a number of marine-related businesses, condominiums, and boathouses, occupy the area surrounding the park, marinas, and boat channels. West End's most recognizable icon, the New Canal Lighthouse or more commonly New Basin Canal Lighthouse, originally constructed in 1838, was heavily damaged by Hurricanes Katrina and Rita. Reconstruction of the familiar landmark began in February 2012 and was completed in 2013.

== Geography ==
West End is located at 30°00′44″N 90°07′05″W and has an elevation of 0 feet (0.0 m). According to the United States Census Bureau, the district has a total area of 5.64 square miles (14.6 km^{2}). 0.70 square miles (1.8 km^{2}) of which is land and 4.94 square miles (12.8 km^{2}) (87.59%) of which is water.

=== Adjacent neighborhoods ===
- West End (north)
- Lakeview (east)
- Navarre (east)
- Mid-City (east)
- Dixon (south)
- Hollygrove (south)
- Jefferson Parish (west)

=== Boundaries ===
West End is the westernmost point of the lakefront in Orleans Parish, with Jefferson Parish and Bucktown on the other side of the 17th Street Canal.

The City Planning Commission defines the boundaries of West End as these streets: Lake Pontchartrain, the New Basin Canal, Pontchartrain Boulevard, Veterans Memorial Boulevard and the 17th Street Canal.

== Demographics ==
According to the American Community Survey of 2019, there were 3,931 people, 1,804 households, and 839 families residing in the neighborhood. 12.1% of residents have a graduate or professional degree.

== History ==
West End was originally a nationally renowned resort built between 1835 and 1876 and named New Lake End. In 1878, the name was changed to West End with the additions of a hotel, restaurant, and an amusement park built on piers over Lake Pontchartrain. (In the 20th century, the amusement park was moved to a newer stretch of reclaimed land and became part of a large, privately owned complex called Pontchartrain Beach.)

The oldest point-to-point sailing regatta in the Western Hemisphere, the Race to the Coast was formed on July 4, 1850 by Southern Yacht Club and took their start at Dan Hickock's Lake Hotel at West End before transiting the Rigolets Pass through the marsh leading into Lake Borgne and finishing at a pier near the Montgomery Hotel along the Mississippi Sound in Pass Christian, Mississippi. The regatta continues today with a start on Lake Pontchartrain and finishes in Gulfport, Mississippi at the Gulfport Yacht Club.

In the late 19th century, the City of New Orleans constructed a harbor and railroad and streetcar facilities along the New Basin Canal and the 17th Street Canal. By 1921, it had built a seawall 500 feet (150 m) out into the Lake and filled in this space to create the large and oak-lined West End Park.

West End was a popular music venue in the early days of jazz. Joe "King" Oliver wrote the tune West End Blues in commemoration of the area; a recording of the number by Louis Armstrong is one of the most famous jazz recordings of the 1920s.

West End has also appeared on the pages of works by notable authors including Mark Twain's Life on the Mississippi and Kate Chopin's novel The Awakening (Chopin novel)

The area grew to become well known for outstanding and historic seafood restaurants, including Brunings which opened in 1859 and operated nearly continuously. Damage from Hurricane Georges prompted a move to a nearby building somewhat better sheltered from storm surge, but it was destroyed by Hurricane Katrina on August 29, 2005.

== Gallery ==
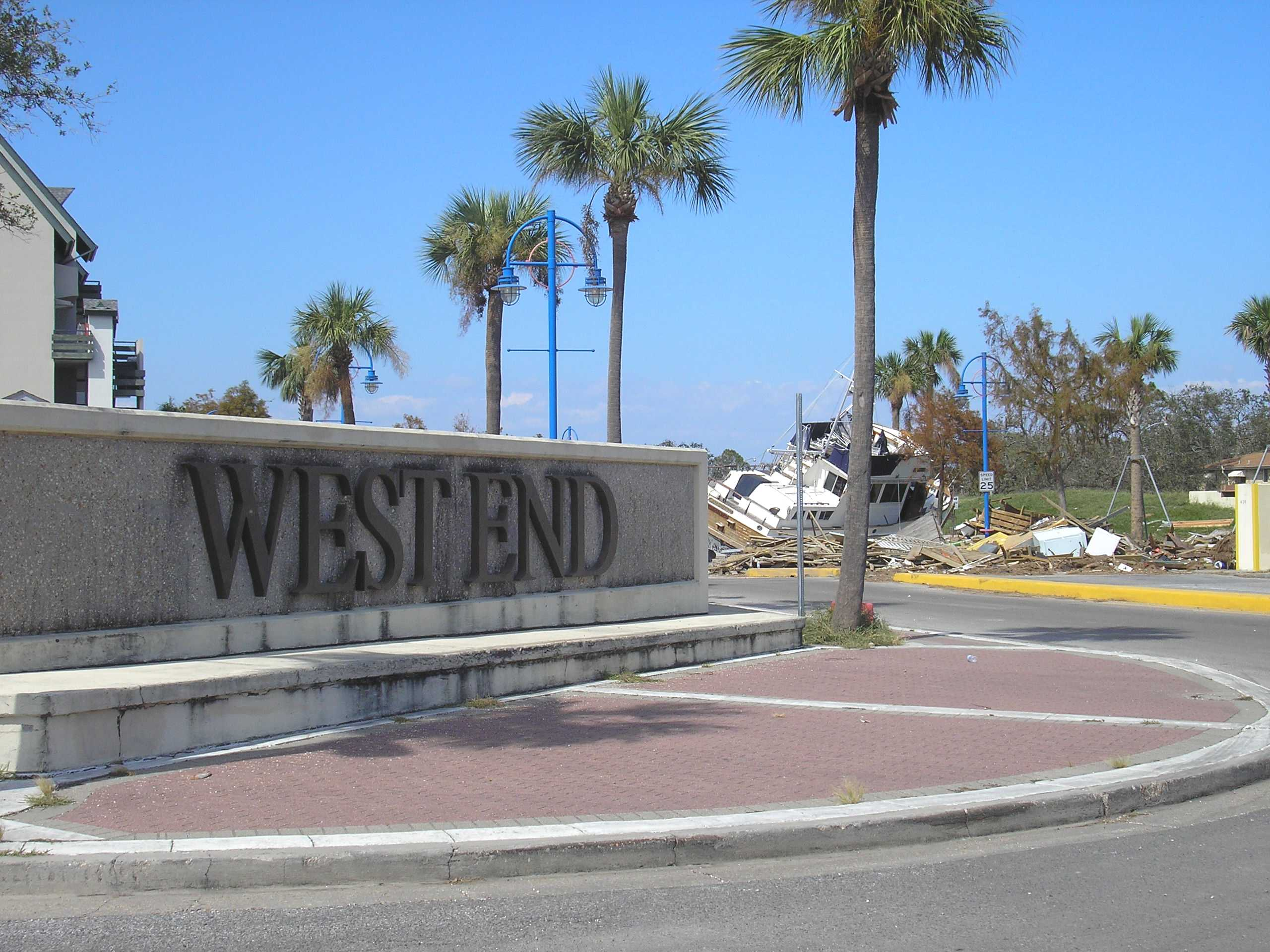
Entrance to West End four days after Hurricane Katrina - 2005

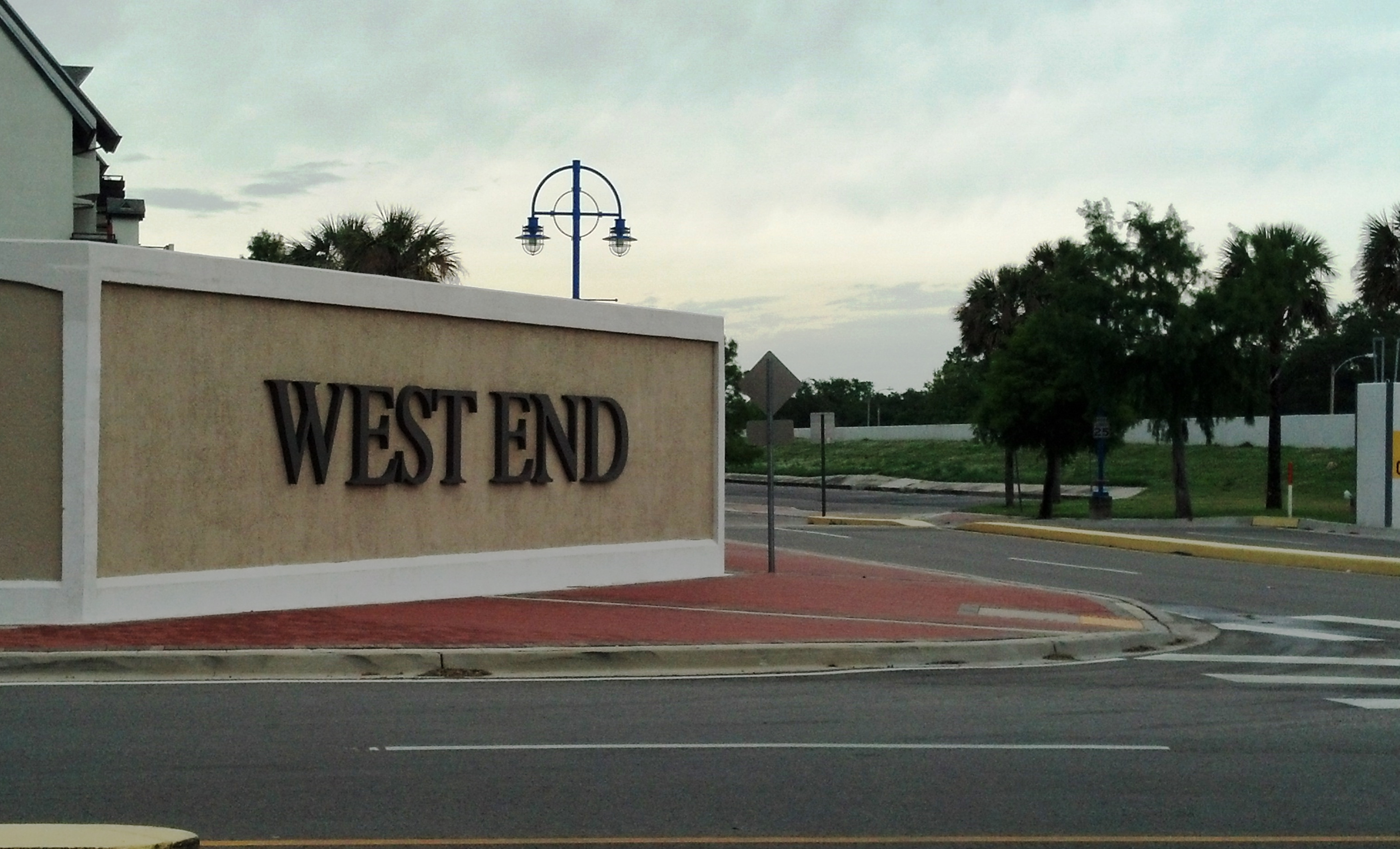
Entrance to West End - 2013

== See also ==
- Neighborhoods in New Orleans
- New Basin Canal
- New Canal Lighthouse
