= Ronnie Virgets =

American journalist (1942–2019)

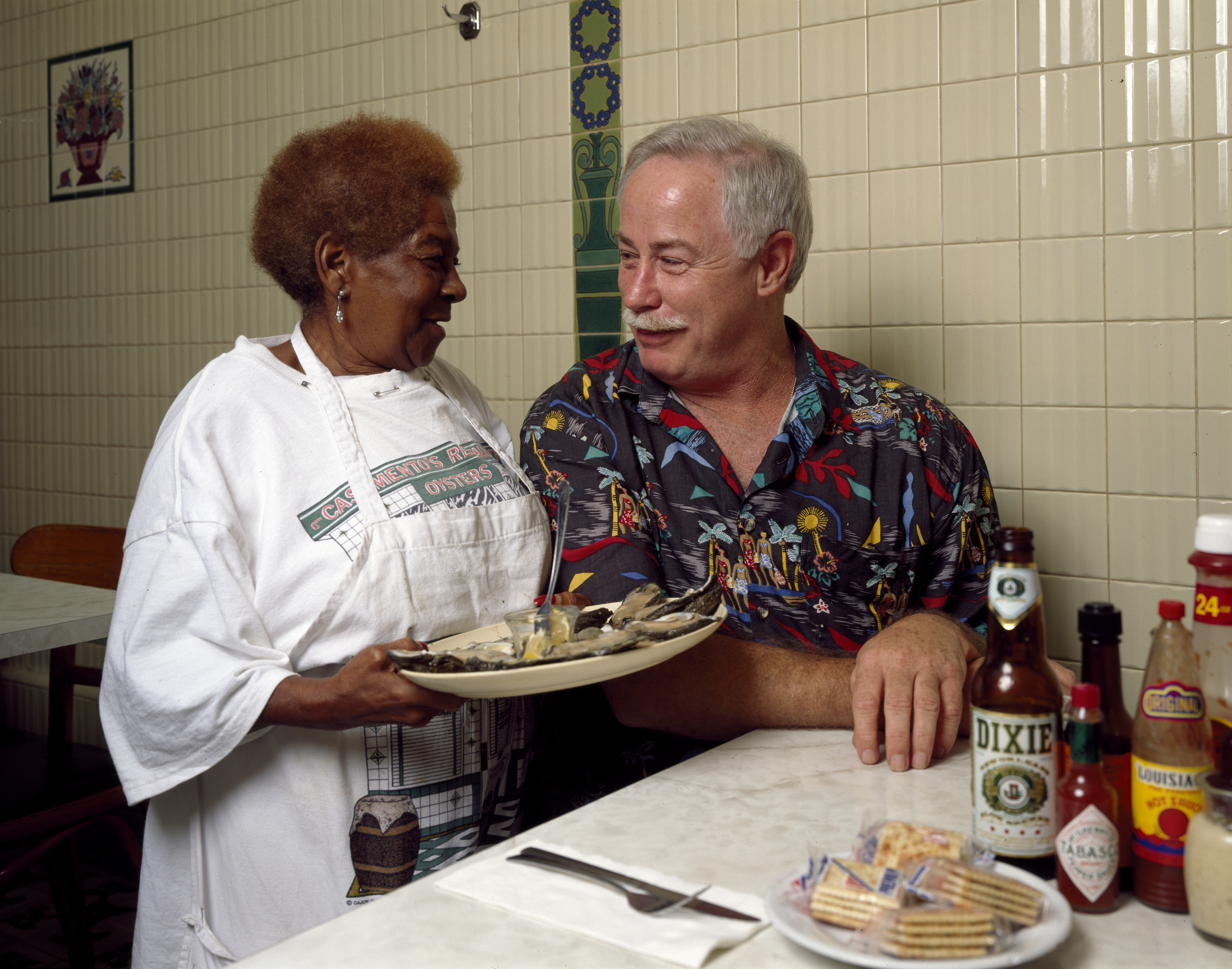
Virgets (right) at Casamento's Restaurant in Uptown New Orleans; photo by Carol M. Highsmith.

Ronald Edward Virgets (April 4, 1942 – May 20, 2019) was an American writer, commentator, and journalist. A native of New Orleans, Louisiana, he lived there for most of his life.

== Background ==
Virgets attended Sacred HeartElementary School, St. Aloysius High School and graduated from Loyola University New Orleans in 1965.

Following his graduation, Virgets took an Army tour of duty to Vietnam from 1965–1968. He began writing sports features for the New Orleans Times-Picayune in the mid-70s.

Virgets joined WDSU TV NewsChannel 6 in September 2000 as a feature reporter for Sunday's 10 p.m. newscast. Before that he spent several years as WWL-TV's feature reporter.

He wrote for New Orleans area publications including The Times-Picayune, Gambit, New Orleans Magazine, and has published several books. He appears regularly on local radio and television, mostly discussing aspects of local culture. He was awarded a Lifetime Achievement Award by the Press Club of New Orleans in 2002.

Besides his local fame, Virgets said that his proudest professional achievement was when he won a regional Emmy award for a 1992 story on the city of New Orleans.

Virgets served as host of Crescent City, a radio program broadcast in New Orleans on the local National Public Radio affiliate, WWNO. His personal papers are archived at Loyola University New Orleans.

== Personal life ==
Virgets was divorced and had three children. He reigned as King of Krewe du Vieux for New Orleans Mardi Gras in 1996. Among his hobbies, Virgets enjoyed fishing and thoroughbred racing. At one time, he owned greyhound racing dogs. Virgets and his family appeared on the TV series Family Feud in an episode first aired on November 15, 2006.

Virgets died Monday May 20, 2019 at the age of 77.

== Hurricane Katrina ==
Virgets "rode out" Hurricane Katrina in August 2005, in his home in the Navarre neighborhood of New Orleans. The area flooded severely when the Federal levees failed (see: Effect of Hurricane Katrina on New Orleans), and a few days later he was rescued by boat. Virgets wrote an essay giving his impressions of how the storm and its devastation have impacted New Orleans, the Gulf Coast, people living in these areas, and himself. Diary of a Displaced Person: the First 72 Hours was read by Virgets for National Public Radio, and also appears as one of the chapters in his book, Lost Bread.

== Books by Ronnie Virgets ==
- Say Cap!: The New Orleans Views of Ronnie Virgets Published by Arthur Hardy Enterprises in 1997 (ISBN 0-930892-50-X)
- Lost Bread (Pain Perdu) Flavored with a Little Steen's Cane Syrup Published by Arthur Hardy Enterprises in 2006 (ISBN 0-930892-67-4)
- Saints and Lesser Souls : The New Orleans Views of Ronnie Virgets 2017
