= Lakeview, New Orleans =

Lakeview
- New Orleans Neighborhood
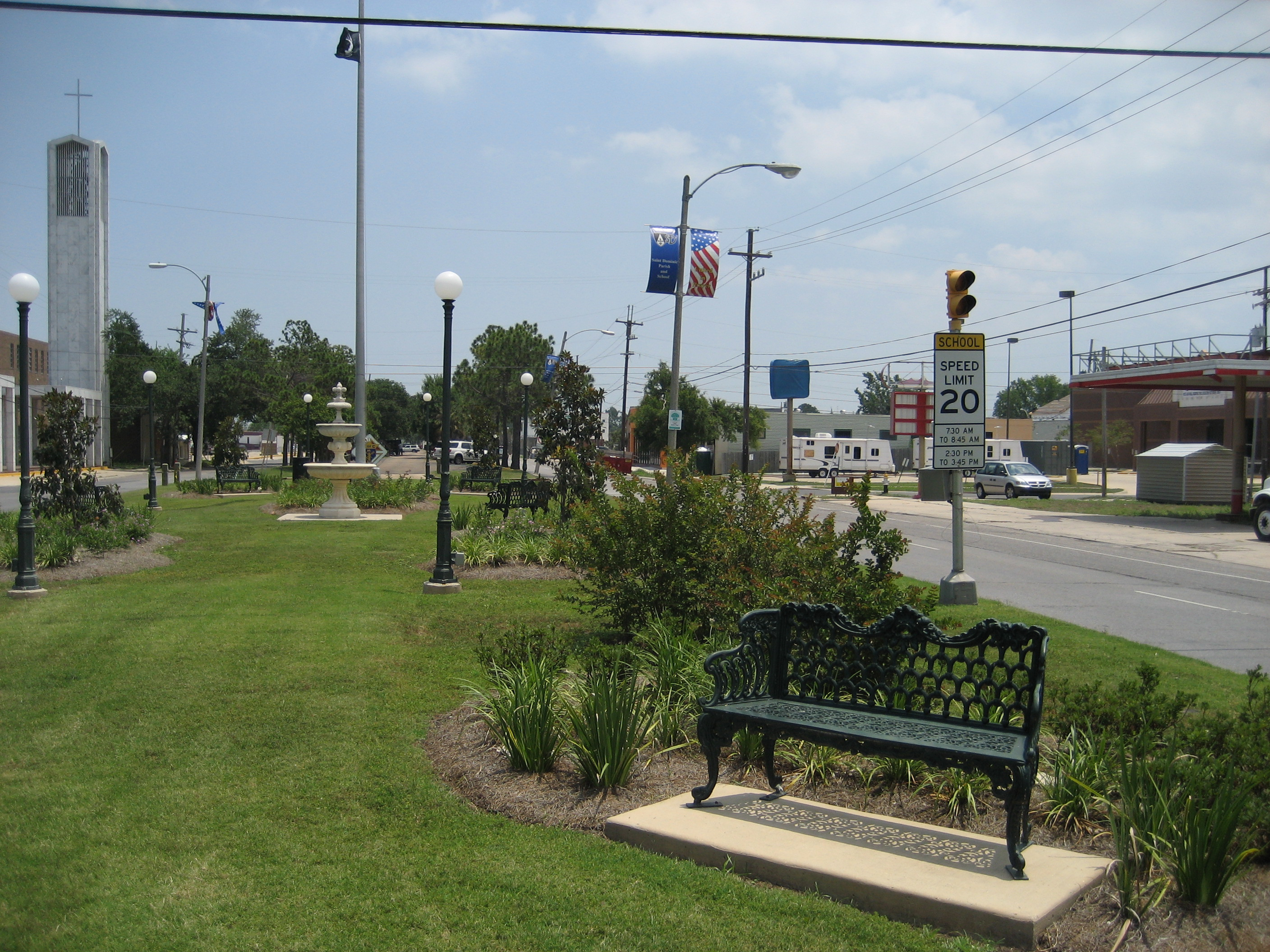
- Harrison Avenue, Lakeview
- Interactive map of Lakeview
- Coordinates: 30°00′24″N 90°06′28″W
- Country: United States
- State: Louisiana
- City: New Orleans
- Planning District: District 5, Lakeview District

Area
  - Total: 1.61 sq mi (4.2 km^{2})
  - Land: 1.61 sq mi (4.2 km^{2})
  - Water: 0 sq mi (0 km^{2})
- Elevation: 0 ft (0 m)

Population (2019)
  - Total: 8,388
  - Density: 5,210/sq mi (2,010/km^{2})
- Time zone: UTC-6 (CST)
  - Summer (DST): UTC-5 (CDT)
- Area code: 504

Lakeview is a neighborhood of the city of New Orleans. A subdistrict of the Lakeview District Area, its boundaries as defined by the City Planning Commission are: Robert E Lee Boulevard to the north, Orleans Avenue to the east, Florida Boulevard, Canal Boulevard and I-610 to the south and Pontchartrain Boulevard to the west. Lakeview is sometimes used to describe the entire area bounded by Lake Pontchartrain to the north, the Orleans Avenue Canal to the east, City Park Avenue to the south and the 17th Street Canal to the west. This larger definition includes the West End, Lakewood and Navarre neighborhoods, as well as the Lakefront neighborhoods of Lakeshore and Lake Vista.

== Geography ==
Lakeview is located at 30°00′24″N 90°06′28″W and has an elevation of 0 feet (0.0 m). According to the United States Census Bureau, the district has a total area of 1.61 square miles (4.2 km^{2}). 1.61 square miles (4.2 km^{2}) of which is land and 0.0 square miles (0.0 km^{2}) (0.0%) of which is water.

Major north–south roads are Pontchartrain Boulevard, West End Boulevard, and Canal Boulevard - the last a prolongation of Canal Street; major east–west roads include Harrison Avenue and Robert E Lee Boulevard. With its easy access to the waters of Lake Pontchartrain, Lakeview has a large sailing and boating community and is served by two yacht clubs, the New Orleans Yacht Club and Southern Yacht Club. The neighborhood is dominated by two large parks, New Basin Canal Park and City Park.

=== Adjacent neighborhoods ===
- Lakeshore/Lake Vista (north)
- City Park (east)
- Navarre (south)
- Lakewood (west)
- West End (west)

=== Boundaries ===
The City Planning Commission defines the boundaries of Lakeview as these streets: Robert E Lee Boulevard, Orleans Avenue, Florida Boulevard, Canal Boulevard and I-610 and Pontchartrain Boulevard.

== Demographics ==
According to the American Community Survey of 2019, there were 8,388 people, 3,160 households, and 2,136 families residing in the neighborhood. 31% of residents have a graduate or professional degree.

== History ==
In the 19th century and early 20th century, the area was mostly undeveloped swamp. The New Basin Canal was cut through the area in the early 19th century.

Though the Navarre section, encompassing the area between and around City Park Avenue and Florida Avenue began developing slowly early in the 20th century, large-scale residential development of most of the area began after World War II, with the predominant housing style being bungalows. New Orleans became a majority-African American city around 1980, and by the 1990s, Lakeview was one of the only almost entirely white neighborhoods remaining in New Orleans. Originally, Lakeview was mostly middle class, but it became more economically upscale in the last couple decades of the 20th century. By the late 20th century, many larger newly constructed homes had replaced older, more modest homes in much of Lakeview.

=== Hurricane Katrina ===
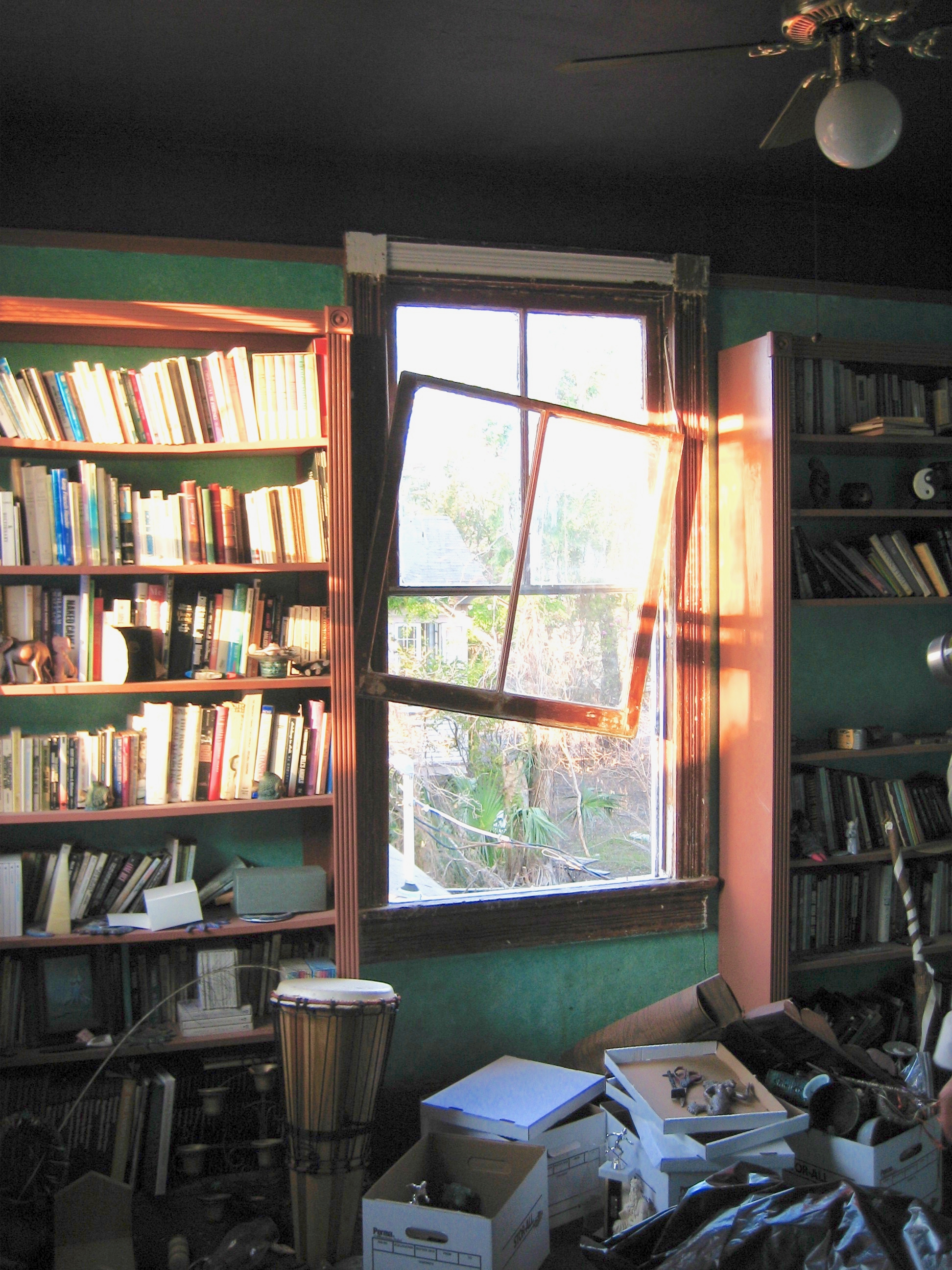
Upstairs library room in home where downstairs flooded Lakeview neighborhood. Hurricane winds blew out window, but left books in shelves

Hurricane Katrina hit southeast Louisiana on August 29, 2005. As the waters of Lake Pontchartrain rose with the storm, a section of levee floodwall along the 17th Street Canal near its mouth with the lake collapsed catastrophically. This was one of the most significant levee failures which occurred in the wake of Katrina's landfall and put the majority of the city underwater.

Floodwaters from the floodwall breach inundated large parts of the neighborhood in a matter of minutes. Near the breach itself, the force of the rushing water uprooted trees and even separated some houses from their foundations. Some areas received as much as fourteen feet of floodwater.

Most Lakeview residents had the means to escape the city before the storm came ashore, but decaying bodies were found in the attics of several houses. Additional corpses were discovered as late as March 2006. Most of Lakeview's victims were elderly, as elsewhere in the city.

By early 2006, only a handful of homes had been restored. Some two-story homes had been reoccupied on the second floor while the first floor was gutted and renovated.

By spring 2007, Lakeview was showing signs of life again. As in much of the city, FEMA trailers dotted the area, providing temporary housing while homes were being repaired and rebuilt. The first handful of businesses reopened, including some retail stores and restaurants.

Army Corps of Engineers repair work on the 17th Street Canal floodwalls in Lakeview is still ongoing as of May 2007. Some houses on property near the canal have been expropriated by the Corps of Engineers. Proposals to expropriate more homes — including a number of homes that have been repaired and reoccupied — have generated controversy.

== Education ==
=== Primary and secondary schools ===
New Orleans Public Schools (NOPS) and the Recovery School District have a system of public schools.

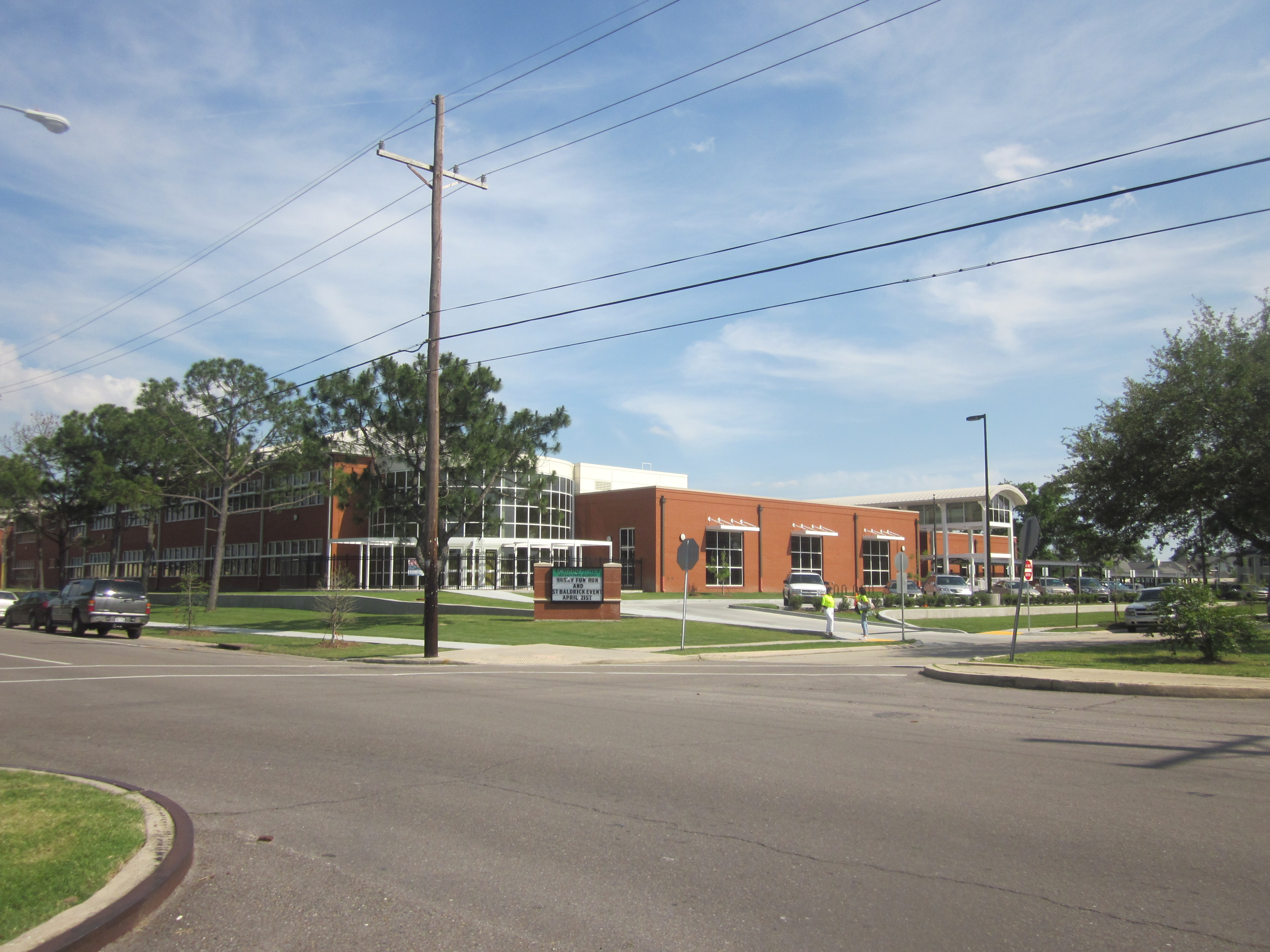
New Hynes Elementary School building in 2012

Hynes Elementary School is located in Lakeview. It opened on September 9, 1952. On August 29, 2005 Hurricane Katrina caused flood damage, and the school was closed for the remaining portion of the 2005–2006 school year. In March 2006 NOPS granted a Type 3 charter to the school.

=== Public libraries ===
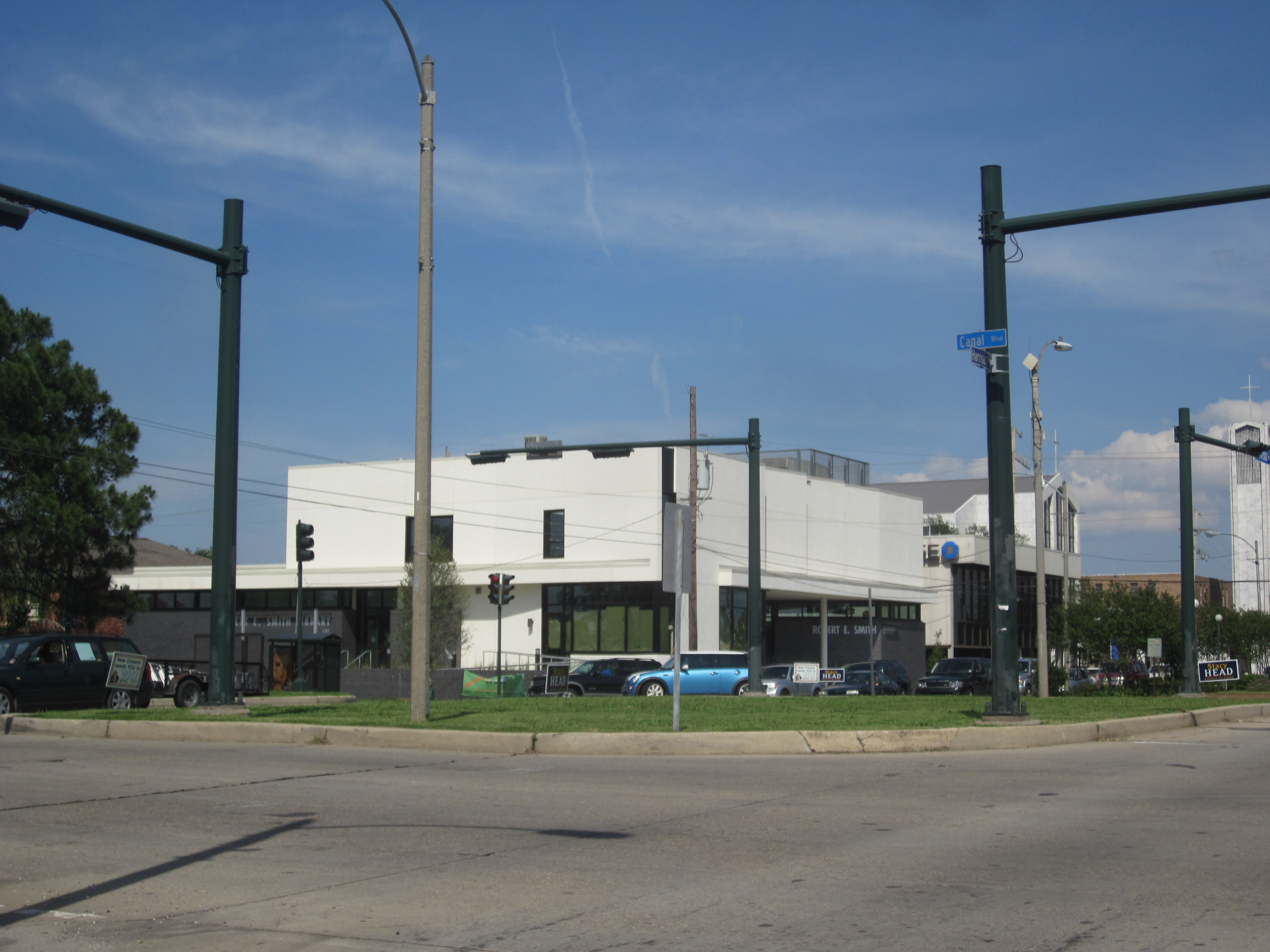
Robert E. Smith Branch Library

New Orleans Public Library serves Lakeview. The Robert E. Smith Branch Library is in a $4.6-million facility paid with bonds and recovery funds that opened in March 2012. The Smith Branch was the third of four libraries that reopened in a two-month period. It has 12,700 square feet (1,180 m^{2}) of space. Its ribbon-cutting ceremony was on March 22 of that year. The branch is named after a person who donated money to the library. The grandson of the namesake, Robert Smith Lupo, financed additional features of the new 2012 library with a $5,000 donation given to the organization Friends of the Library. As of 2012 it has 17 computers and about 40,000 volumes of books.

In the post-Hurricane Katrina period the library system operated the Lakeview Branch, housed in a 64-by-20-foot (19.5 by 6.1 m) modular building. The Gulf Coast Libraries Project of the Gates Foundation funded the branch. The Federal Emergency Management Agency (FEMA) was to pay for the costs of demolition of the previous library and construction of the new library since the previous facility had been, according to FEMA's estimation, over 50% damaged by Katrina. The features and amenities present in the new facility that were not in the previous facility were financed by other sources, including New Orleans municipal bond sales and funds from the Louisiana Recovery Authority. The "design-build" process, one specially allowed only in parishes affected by Hurricane Katrina under Louisiana law, was used to rebuild this library and four others.

Lee Ledbetter & Associates of New Orleans served as the architectural firm, and Gibbs Construction served as the construction company. Lee Ledbetter & Associates worked with Kansas City, Missouri firm Gould Evans & Associates to design this library and four others. Lee Ledbetter of Lee Ledbetter & Associates stated that the libraries his company designed were made to have better access to public transportation and have reduced utility usage, including having electricity and water-saving features, in order to be more cost effective.

== Religion ==
The Roman Catholic Archdiocese of New Orleans operates Roman Catholic churches. Dedicated on October 21, 1912, was Ave Maria Church, the first church in the neighborhood. A September 29, 1915 weather event demolished the building.

== See also ==
- Neighborhoods in New Orleans
- Effects of Hurricane Katrina in New Orleans
