= City Park, New Orleans =

City Park
- New Orleans Neighborhood
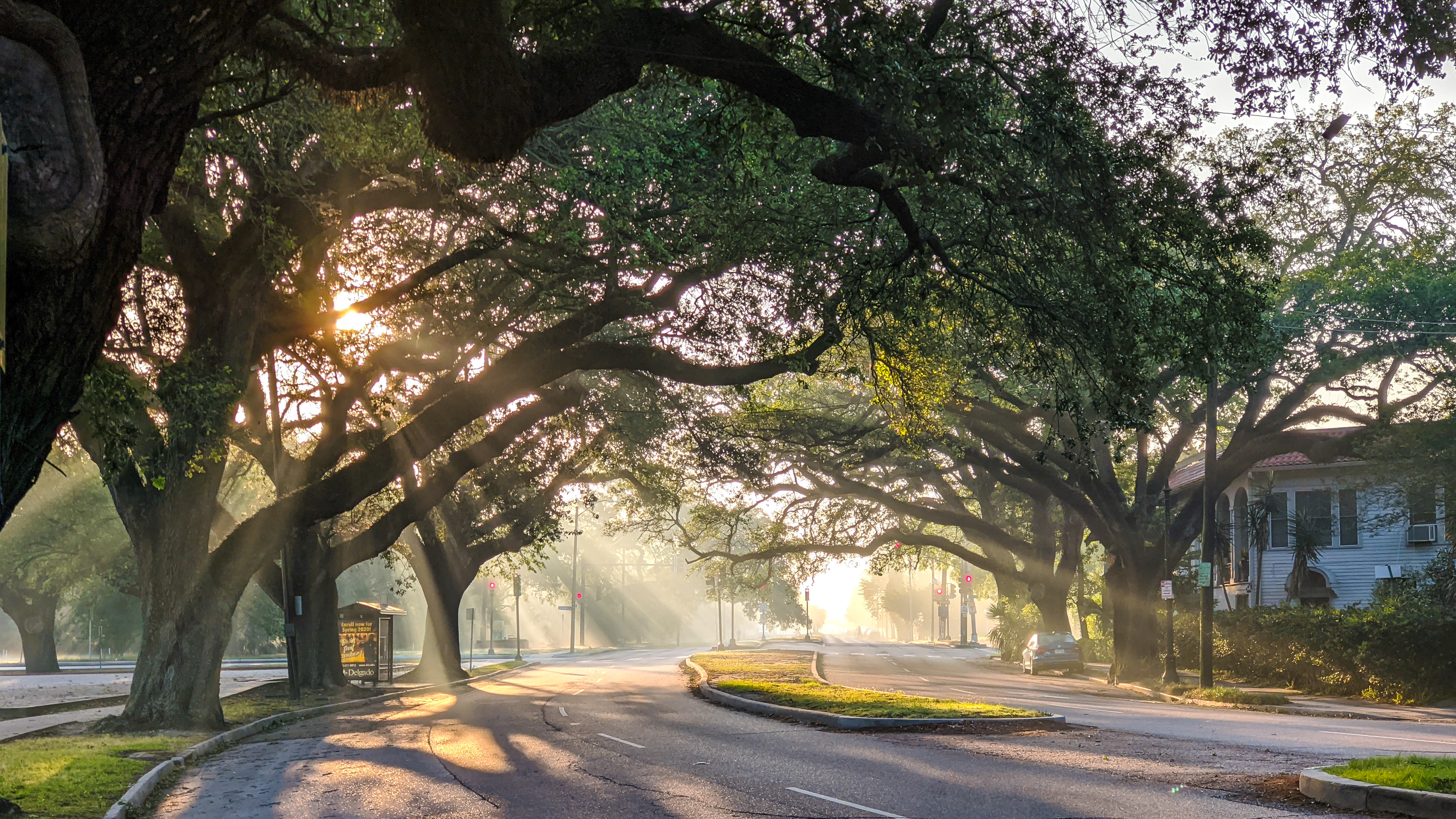
- City Park
- Interactive map of City Park
- Coordinates: 30°00′06″N 90°05′34″W
- Country: United States
- State: Louisiana
- City: New Orleans
- Planning District: District 5, Lakeview District

Area
  - Total: 2.48 sq mi (6.4 km^{2})
  - Land: 2.34 sq mi (6.1 km^{2})
  - Water: 0.14 sq mi (0.36 km^{2})
- Elevation: 0 ft (0 m)

Population (2010)
  - Total: 1,600
  - Density: 680/sq mi (260/km^{2})
- Time zone: UTC-6 (CST)
  - Summer (DST): UTC-5 (CDT)
- Area code: 504

City Park is a neighborhood of the city of New Orleans, US. A subdistrict of the Lakeview District Area, its boundaries as defined by the City Planning Commission are: Allen Toussaint Boulevard to the north, Bayou St. John to the east, Orleans Avenue, North Carrollton Avenue and Toulouse Street to the south and City Park and Orleans Avenues to the west. The neighborhood is named after and dominated by City Park.

== Geography ==
City Park is located at 30°00′06″N 90°05′34″W and has an elevation of 0 feet (0.0 m). According to the United States Census Bureau, the district has a total area of 2.48 square miles (6.4 km^{2}), 2.34 square miles (6.1 km^{2}) of which is land and 0.14 square miles (0.4 km^{2}) (5.65%) of which is water.

=== Adjacent neighborhoods ===
- Lake Shore - Lake Vista (north)
- Mid-City (south)
- Lakeview, New Orleans (west)
- Navarre, New Orleans (west)
- Filmore, New Orleans (east)
- Bayou St. John (east)

=== Boundaries ===
The City Planning Commission defines the boundaries of City Park as these streets: Allen Toussaint Boulevard, Bayou St. John, Orleans Avenue, North Carrollton Avenue, Toulouse Street, City Park Avenue and Orleans Avenue.

== Demographics ==
At the 2000 census, there were 2,813 people, 1,565 households and 580 families living in the neighborhood. The population density was 1,202 /mi^{2} (461 /km^{2}).

At the 2010 census, there were 2,708 people, 1,447 households and 553 families living in the neighborhood.

== See also ==
- New Orleans neighborhoods
