= New Orleans Willie Jackson =

- Also known as: Sonny Porter
- Born: 1896 or 1897; Louisiana, U.S.
- Died: after 1930
- Genres: Jazz; blues
- Occupations: Musician; dancer
- Instrument: Vocals

New Orleans Willie Jackson (1896 or 1897 – after 1930) was an American blues and jazz singer, active in New Orleans, Louisiana, and New York City, in the 1920s.

He sang blues, jazz, and comic numbers. Jackson frequently performed with pianist Steve Lewis at Spanish Fort, New Orleans, and they recorded some phonograph records. These were made for Columbia Records between 1926 and 1928. Jackson also sang vocals in King Oliver's band, the Dixie Syncopators. Two of his songs, "How Long" and "She Keeps it Up All the Time," are featured on several New Orleans blues and jazz anthologies. He made the first recording of the track "T.B. Blues", which later became more associated with Victoria Spivey.
