= Lakewood, New Orleans =

Lakewood
- New Orleans neighborhood
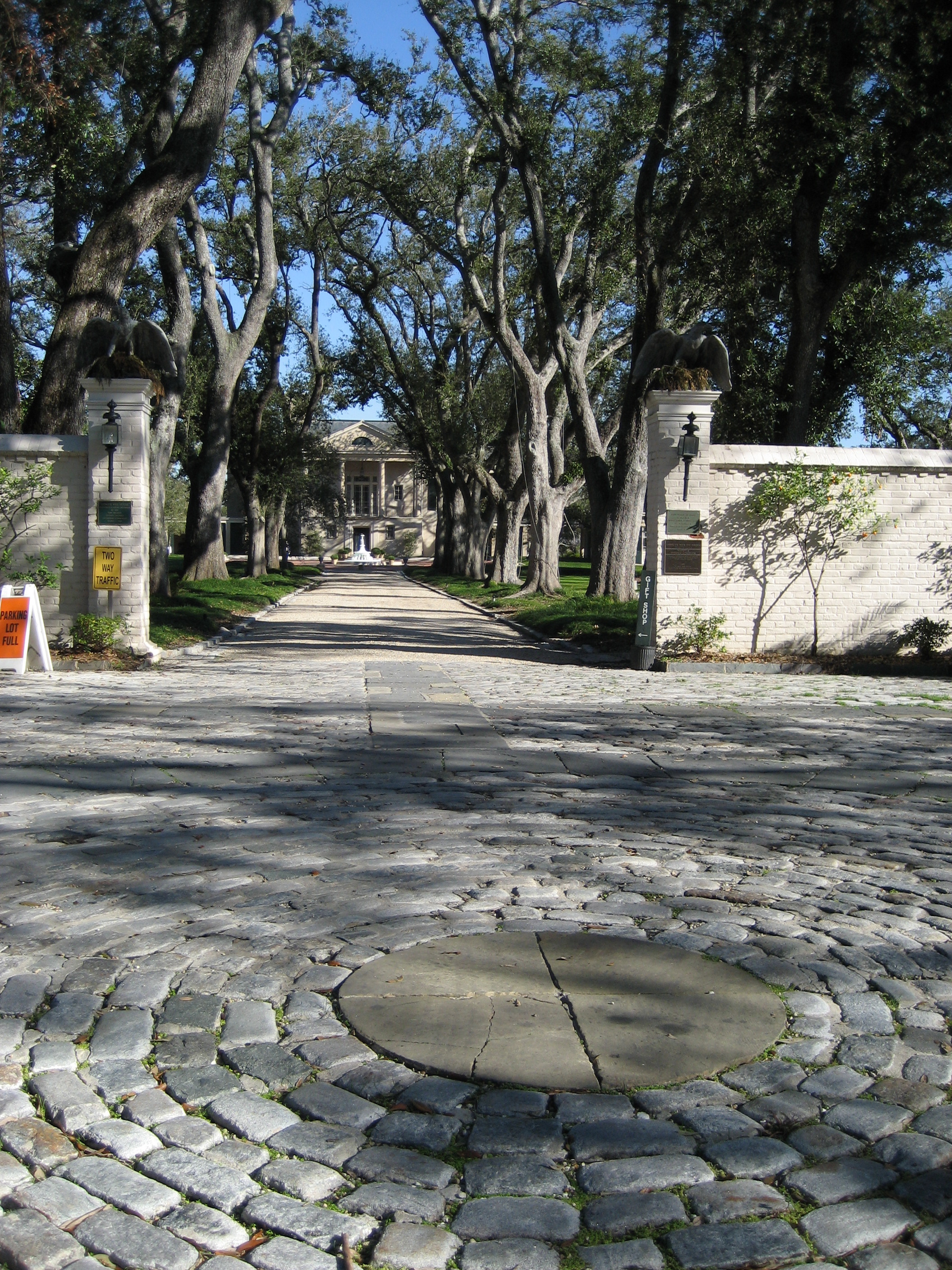
- Longue Vue House
- Interactive map of Lakewood
- Coordinates: 29°59′17″N 90°07′11″W
- Country: United States
- State: Louisiana
- City: New Orleans
- Planning District: District 5, Lakeview District

Area
  - Total: 0.88 sq mi (2.3 km^{2})
  - Land: 0.88 sq mi (2.3 km^{2})
  - Water: 0.00 sq mi (0 km^{2})
- Elevation: 0 ft (0 m)

Population (2019)
  - Total: 1,885
  - Density: 2,100/sq mi (830/km^{2})
- Time zone: UTC-6 (CST)
  - Summer (DST): UTC-5 (CDT)
- Area code: 504

Lakewood is a neighborhood of the city of New Orleans. A subdistrict of the Lakeview District Area, its boundaries as defined by the City Planning Commission are: Veterans Memorial Boulevard to the north, Pontchartrain Boulevard and the Pontchartrain Expressway to the east, Last, Quince, Hamilton, Peach, Mistletoe, Dixon, Cherry and Palmetto Streets to the south and the 17th Street Canal to the west.

For decades Lakewood Country Club operated in the neighborhood, predating most residential construction and bestowing its name upon the developing area. With the finalization of I-10's and I-610's routes in the 1960s, much of Lakewood's golf course was expropriated for the sprawling I-10/I-610 interchange. Lakewood Country Club relocated to the Algiers neighborhood, on the West Bank of the Mississippi River, and the remainder of the golf course was developed as the Lakewood North and Lakewood South subdivisions. The former clubhouse remained for years, visible from I-10 and lastly used as the main building for the now-closed New Orleans Academy. The clubhouse was ultimately demolished to make room for a LDS Church, itself demolished in the aftermath of catastrophic flooding occurring in the wake of Hurricane Katrina.

== Geography ==
Lakewood is located at 29°59′17″N 90°07′11″W and has an elevation of 0 feet (0.0 m). According to the United States Census Bureau, the district has a total area of 0.88 square miles (2.3 km^{2}). 0.88 square miles (2.3 km^{2}) of which is land and 0.00 square miles (0.0 km^{2}) (0.0%) of which is water.

Lakewood includes the Metairie Cemetery and Longue Vue House and Gardens.

=== Adjacent neighborhoods ===
- West End (north)
- Lakeview (east)
- Navarre (east)
- Mid-City (east)
- Dixon (south)
- Hollygrove (south)
- Jefferson Parish (west)

=== Boundaries ===
The City Planning Commission defines the boundaries of Lakewood as these streets: Veterans Memorial Boulevard, Pontchartrain Boulevard, Pontchartrain Expressway, Last Street, Quince Street, Hamilton Street, Peach Street, Mistletoe Street, Dixon Street, Cherry Street, Palmetto Street and the 17th Street Canal.

== Demographics ==
According to the American Community Survey of 2019, there were 1,885 people, 692 households, and 529 families residing in the neighborhood. 38.6% of residents have a graduate or professional degree.

== See also ==
- Neighborhoods in New Orleans
