= Navarre, New Orleans =

Navarre
- New Orleans Neighborhood
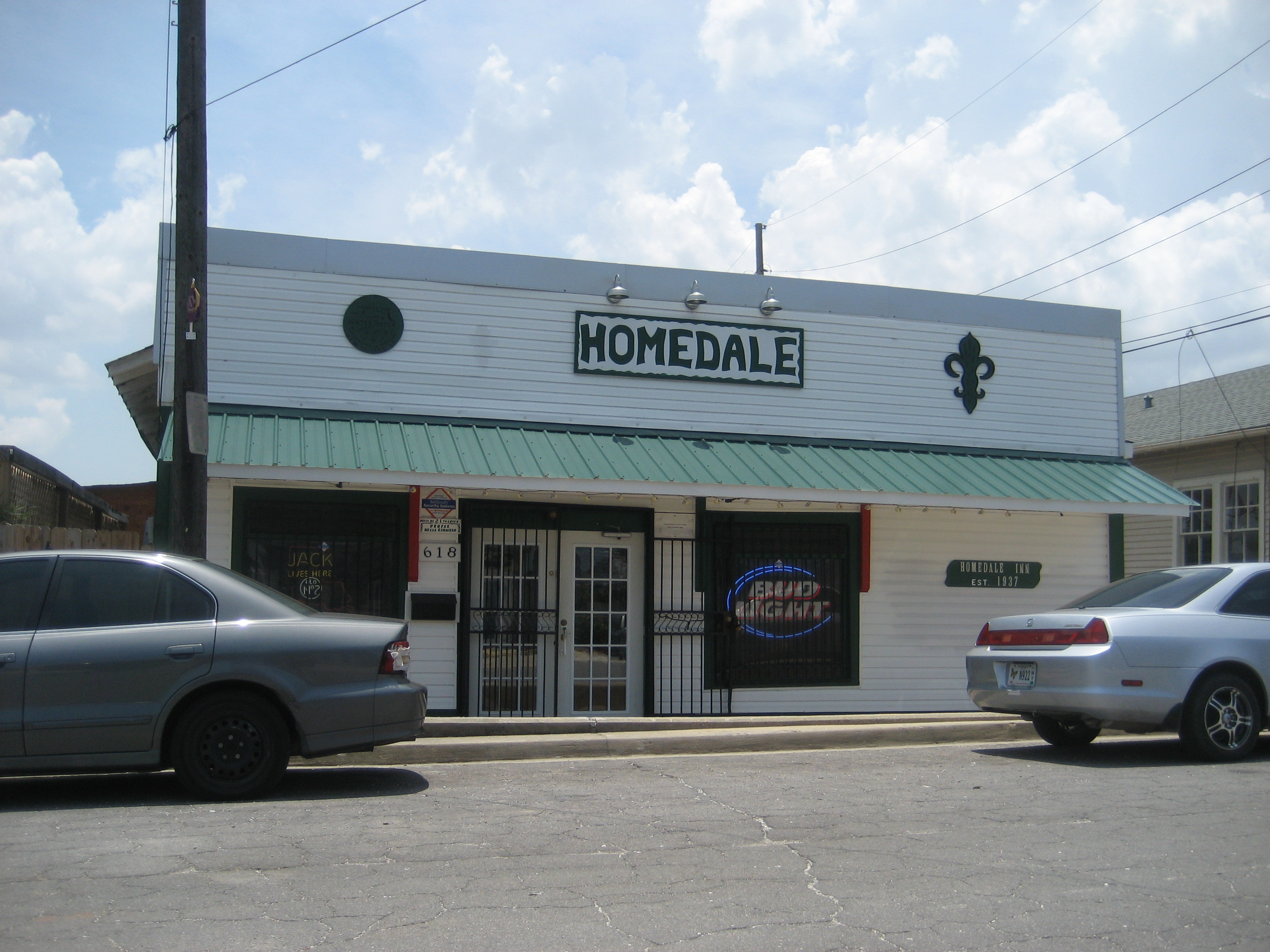
- The Homedale Inn
- Interactive map of Navarre
- Coordinates: 29°59′23″N 90°06′35″W
- Country: United States
- State: Louisiana
- City: New Orleans
- Planning District: District 5, Lakeview District

Area
  - Total: 0.70 sq mi (1.8 km^{2})
  - Land: 0.70 sq mi (1.8 km^{2})
  - Water: 0.00 sq mi (0 km^{2})
- Elevation: 0 ft (0 m)

Population (2020)
  - Total: 2,274
  - Density: 3,200/sq mi (1,300/km^{2})
- Time zone: UTC−6 (CST)
  - Summer (DST): UTC−5 (CDT)
- Area code: 504

Navarre is a neighborhood of the city of New Orleans. A subdistrict of the Lakeview District Area, its boundaries as defined by the City Planning Commission are: I-610, Canal Boulevard and Florida Boulevard to the north, Orleans Avenue to the east, City Park Avenue to the south and the Pontchartrain Expressway and Pontchartrain Boulevard to the west.

== Geography ==
Navarre is located at 29°59′23″N 90°06′35″W and has an elevation of 0 feet (0.0 m). According to the United States Census Bureau, the district has a total area of 0.70 square miles (1.8 km^{2}). 0.70 square miles (1.8 km^{2}) of which is land and 0.00 square miles (0.0 km^{2}) (0.0%) of which is water.

=== Adjacent neighborhoods ===
- Lakeview (north)
- City Park (east)
- Mid-City (south)
- Lakewood (west)

=== Boundaries ===
The City Planning Commission defines the boundaries of Navarre as these streets: I-610, Canal Boulevard, Florida Boulevard, Orleans Avenue, City Park Avenue, the Pontchartrain Expressway and Pontchartrain Boulevard.

== Demographics ==
As of the census of 2000, there were 2,908 people, 1,470 households, and 704 families residing in the neighborhood. The population density was 4,154 /mi^{2} (1,616 /km^{2}).

As of the census of 2020, there were 2,274 people and 1,113 households residing in the neighborhood. The average household income in 2020 was $68,593.

== Features ==
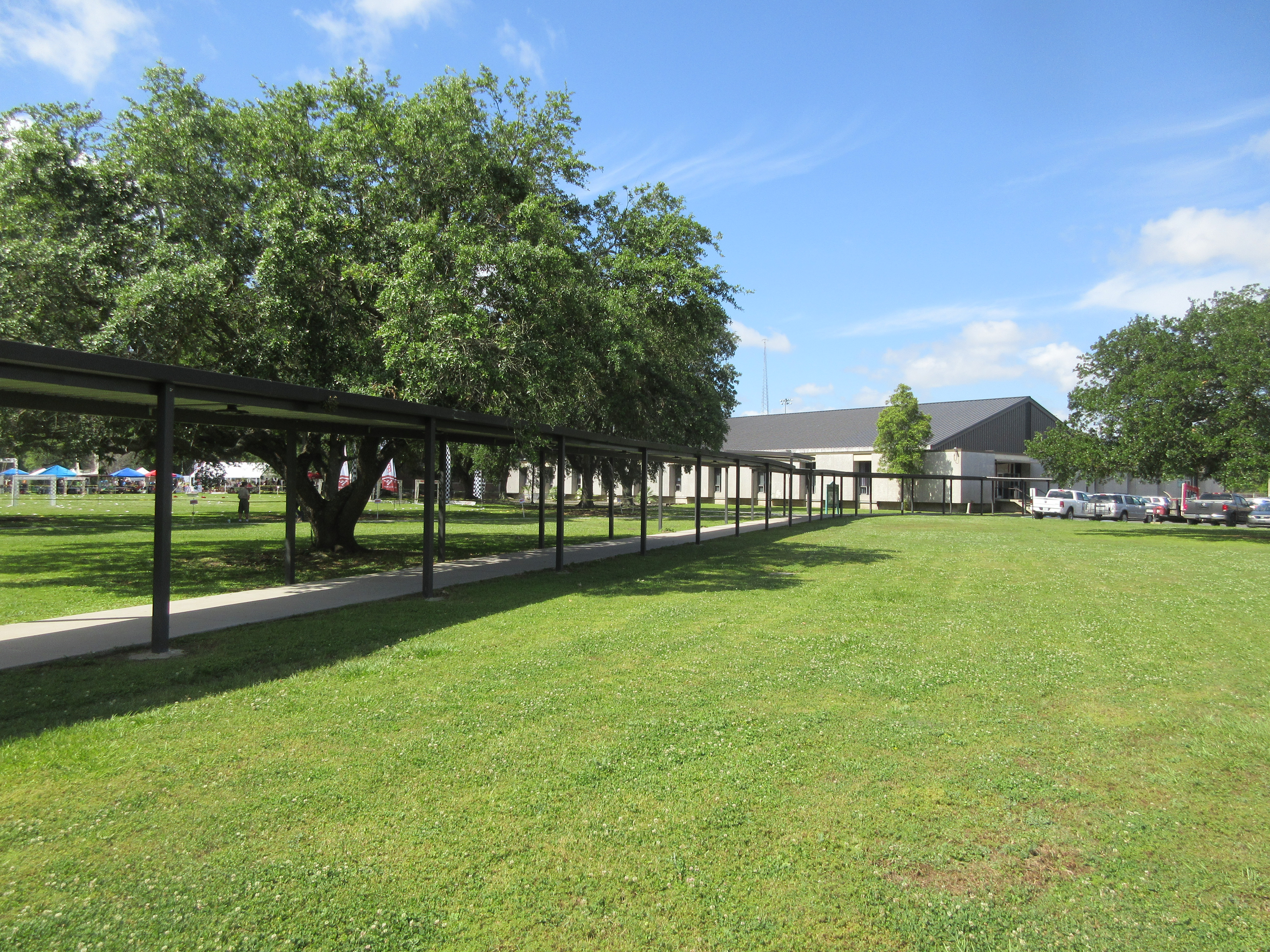
Delgado Community College Campus in 2017

The neighborhood includes Delgado Community College and the local Public Broadcasting Service television station WYES-12 studios. The Greenwood Cemetery, St. Patrick Cemetery, and Holt Cemetery are located in Navarre. Most of the rest of the neighborhood is residential, mostly white middle class and working class, with a small number of neighborhood businesses.

The main streets in the neighborhood are Canal Boulevard running north to south and Navarre Avenue running east to west.

The Navarre neighborhood is the location of the South Lakeview Historic District, which was added to the National Register of Historic Places on May 9, 2002. A portion of the Navarre neighborhood is also included within the boundaries of the City Park / N. O. Museum Cultural District, designated by then Louisiana Lieutenant Governor Mitch Landrieu on November 1, 2008.

== History ==
At the start of the 19th century what would become Navarre was mostly undeveloped swamp land a good distance from the developed parts of the young city along the Mississippi River. The narrow high ground alongside Bayou Metairie became a road, along the sides of which farmland was developed. The first of the area's important landmarks to be developed was Greenwood Cemetery, in 1852. The Canal Street, City Park, and Lake Pontchartrain Railway ran along one edge of the neighborhood on its way out alongside the Orleans Canal to Old Spanish Fort on Lake Pontchartrain. Otherwise, the land after a distance equivalent of a couple blocks back from Metairie Road was swamp.

The 1880s and 1890s saw the first work at reclaiming the swampland in the area for development, and by the early 20th century the area back to Florida Avenue was largely drained. There was substantial development, mostly as white middle class residential single family homes, in the 1920s. The area in the back section of Navarre was the site of the United Fruit Company radio facilities, until it was redeveloped residentially in the 1940s.

During World War II, the U.S. Navy LCVP's, or Higgins boats, were manufactured in the Navarre section of New Orleans. The foundation of the Higgins boat factory is still visible behind Delgado University.

Navarre experienced serious flooding in the aftermath of Hurricane Katrina in 2005.

== Notable residents ==
- Ronnie Virgets, author/commentator

== See also ==
- Neighborhoods in New Orleans
