= Gambit (newspaper) =

Newspaper in New Orleans, Louisiana

Gambit (formerly Gambit Weekly)
- Type: Alternative weekly
- Format: Tabloid
- Owner: Georges Media
- Publisher: Jeanne Exnicios Foster
- Editor: John Stanton
- Founded: 1980
- Headquarters: 823 Camp St. New Orleans, Louisiana, U.S.
- Circulation: 36,000
- Website: BestofNewOrleans.com

Gambit (formerly Gambit Weekly) is a New Orleans, Louisiana-based free alternative weekly newspaper established in 1981.

Gambit features reporting about local politics, news, food and drink, arts, music, film, events, environmental issues and other topics, as well as listings. Gambit publishes 36,000 papers each Tuesday, which are distributed to 400 locations in the New Orleans metro area beginning Sunday afternoon.

In January 2009, the paper changed its name from Gambit Weekly, to which it had been renamed in 1996, back to Gambit, the name under which it had been founded in 1981. On April 9, 2018, Georges Media, the holding company for The New Orleans Advocate, purchased Gambit.

== Content ==
Regular features include "Opening Gambit" (political news briefs), and "Thumbs Up & Thumbs Down," weekly awards for the city's "heroes and zeroes."

Gambit also publishes a weekly editorial and issues endorsements in many political races, with two notable exceptions: it does not endorse in national elections, nor does it endorse in judicial elections (on a longstanding political belief that judges should be appointed, not elected).

The paper sponsors the annual Big Easy Theater Awards and Big Easy Music Awards, honoring New Orleans' best performing artists.

On October 1, 2007, Gambit launched Blog of New Orleans to supplement its website Best of New Orleans with daily updates on New Orleans news, politics, arts, music, sports, cuisine and local culture. Its other publications include CUE, a monthly home and fashion magazine and BRIDE & GROOM, a twice-annual wedding guide.

The paper's columnists include political editor Clancy DuBos, who is also a political analyst and commentator on WWL-TV. Past columnists include Chris Rose, Jeremy Alford, Andrei Codrescu, and Ronnie Virgets. Other former writers and editors include Michael Tisserand, author of the books The Kingdom of Zydeco and Sugarcane Academy, Scott Jordan, former spokesman for the Louisiana Democratic Party, and Rich Collins, a member of the children's music group Imagination Movers.

== Awards ==
The paper has won many local and national honors, and former Gambit writer Katy Reckdahl was awarded Hunter College's James Aronson Award for Social Justice Journalism in 2002 for her series on the mistreatment of the homeless, and a 2002 Casey Journalism Center Medal for Distinguished Coverage of Children and Family Issues for her report titled "Louisiana Juvenile Justice" on the Tallulah Correctional Center for Youth .
