= Nesby Phips =

American rapper

Nesby Phips is a producer, rapper and visual artist from New Orleans.

== Early life ==
Nesby Phips was born Courtney Nero on December 15, 1980 in New Orleans. He grew up living in both the New Orleans neighborhood of Hollygrove and the city's James Alley area of the 3rd Ward, across the street from the Orleans Parish Prison. Phips's family is a musical one—he is the grand-nephew of Mahalia Jackson and has multiple other musicians and visual artists in his family. Phips attended McMain High School in New Orleans along with classmates Lil Wayne, Curren$y, and Mack Maine, all of whom he would later record and produce.

== Music ==
Nesby Phips's sound draws from the jazz, rhythm and blues, and rap traditions of New Orleans as well as global musical traditions, including Ethiopian jazz. Phips's ongoing association with Curren$y and the Jet Life movement resulted in some of his top-selling works of the late 2000s, including the tracks "Prioritize" and "Hold On" off the Pilot Talk 1 & 2 albums. In 2011, he issued the recording The Catch Up, which included previously released Phips hits like the Wiz Khalifa track "Supply" off of Khalifa's mixtape Kush and Orange Juice, which garnered critical attention from New York Magazine, as well as "Word to these Bo Jacksons." GQ Magazine picked Phips's "Passive Cassanova" as one of the top 25 records of the summer in 2014.

As co-owner of and producer for the Hollygrove-based music group 0017th, Phips released the 2012 mixtape, Hollygrove Ain't Enough, featuring Mack Maine and Juvenile.

In February 2015, Phips co-headlined a sold-out show at New Orleans's jazz venue, Preservation Hall, along with No Limit recording star, Fiend. The show was one of the first local New Orleans rap shows at Preservation Hall and featured Pres Hall Brass as the backing acoustic brass band.

Phips released an all-instrumental album, Phipstrumentals, in December, 2015, showing off a new side of his production skill set.

In 2016, Nesby Phips composed the music for Lil Wayne's android videogame, , available via Apple and Google Play.

While much of Nesby Phips's writing is based in allegory and metaphor, the year 2017 brought some of Phips's most literal writing to date with the release of the critically acclaimed album, Black Man 4 Sale, produced by DJ Fu. The album's lead single, "Bang Bang," and its accompanying video found wide rotation, and his nuanced approach to writing on race opened up new avenues of music-based discussion.

On November 16, 2018, Nesby Phips released his album Therapy, co-created by the producer Prospek with additional production from Able Chris and contributions from Chicago's MC Tree. “Technically, it has nothing to do with therapy, specifically,” Phips told Offbeat Magazine. “This project was mostly done some years ago, and I wrapped it up this year. At the time, the process that me and the producer, Prospek, did was therapeutic to us as musicians. We needed a reset as musicians. We said, ‘Forget trying to play the game. Let’s just create for the sake of creating.’ We did it with all live instruments."

== New Orleans culture ==
Nesby Phips has worked as a cultural liaison for writers and filmmakers traveling to New Orleans to document the art, music and culture of the city post-Katrina, including ESPN, Converse, the French Consulate, VICE, Complex Magazine, VIBE, the New York Times and others. Nesby Phips appeared in the documentary Mystery Lights, produced by Nowhere Studios, presented by Converse and released in the UK December 4, 2015.

Phips is a frequent speaker on panels discussing New Orleans music and culture.
