= Hollygrove, New Orleans =

Hollygrove 17th Ward
- New Orleans Neighborhood
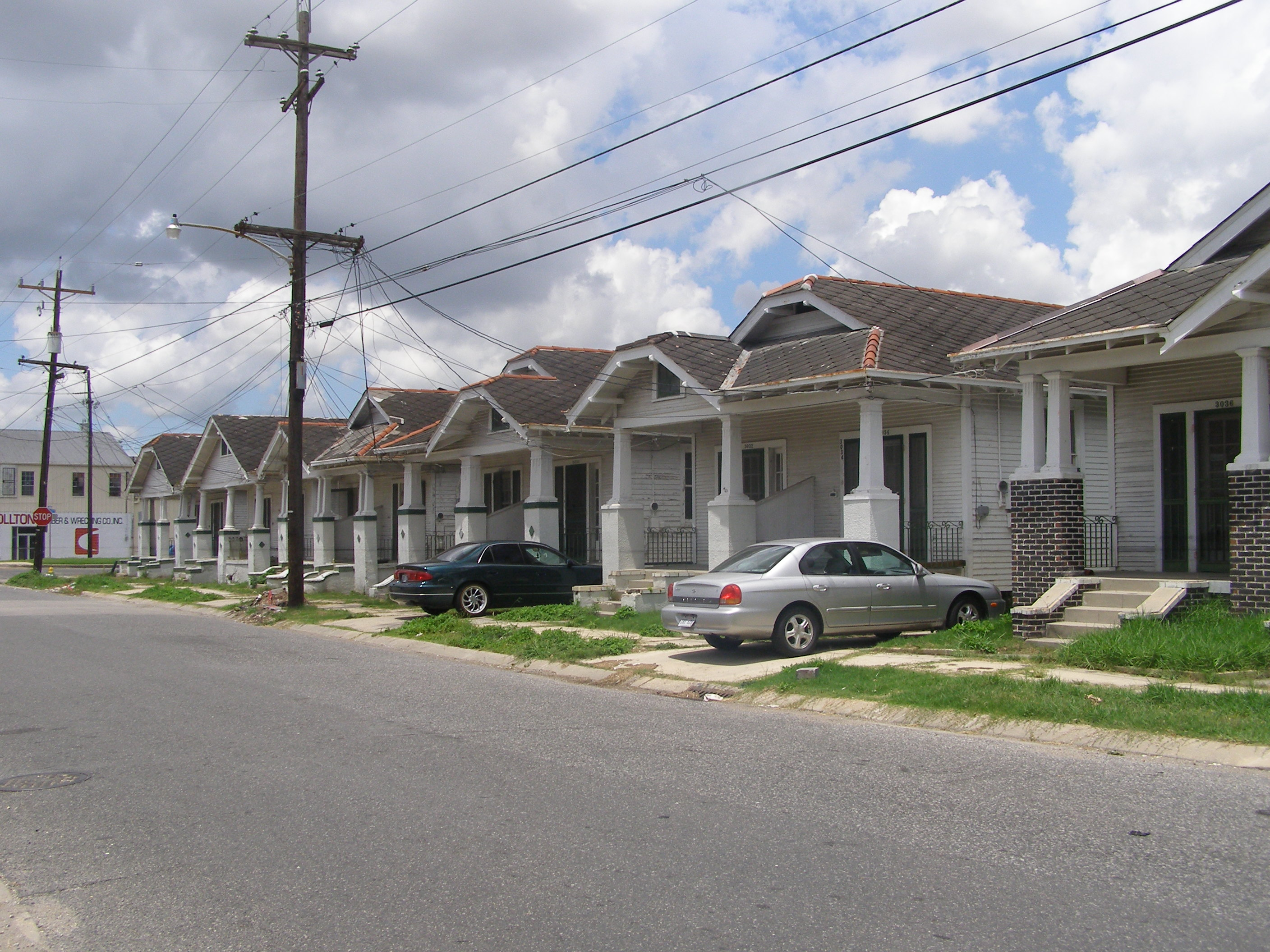
- Row houses on Leonidas Street
- Interactive map of Hollygrove
- Coordinates: 29°57′57″N 90°07′16″W
- Country: United States
- State: Louisiana
- City: New Orleans
- Planning District: District 3, Uptown/Carrollton

Area
  - Total: 0.62 sq mi (1.6 km^{2})
  - Land: 0.62 sq mi (1.6 km^{2})
  - Water: 0.00 sq mi (0 km^{2})
- Elevation: 0 ft (0 m)

Population (2010)
  - Total: 4,377
  - Density: 7,100/sq mi (2,700/km^{2})
- Time zone: UTC-6 (CST)
  - Summer (DST): UTC-5 (CDT)
- Area code: 504

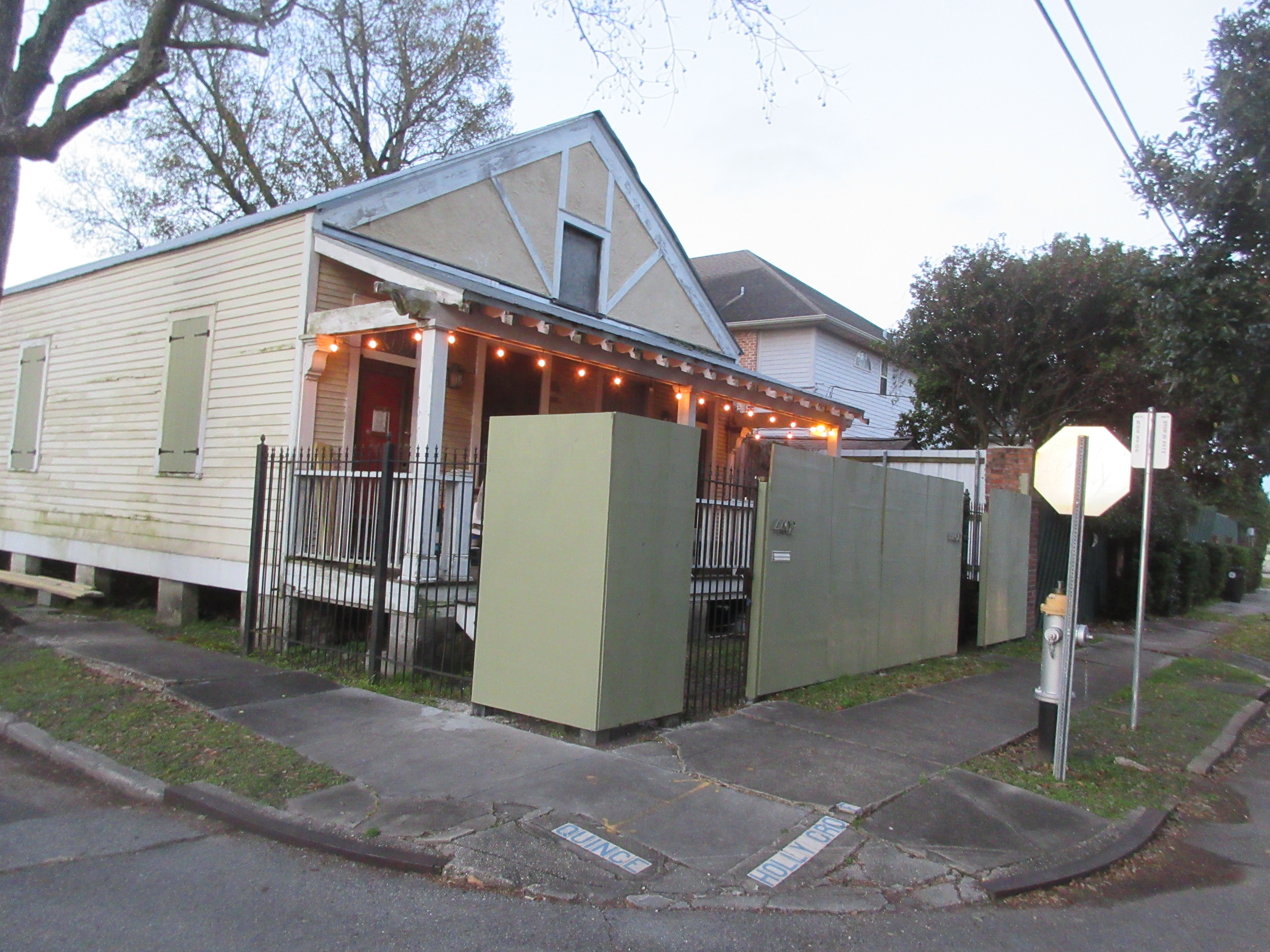
A house located within the neighborhood

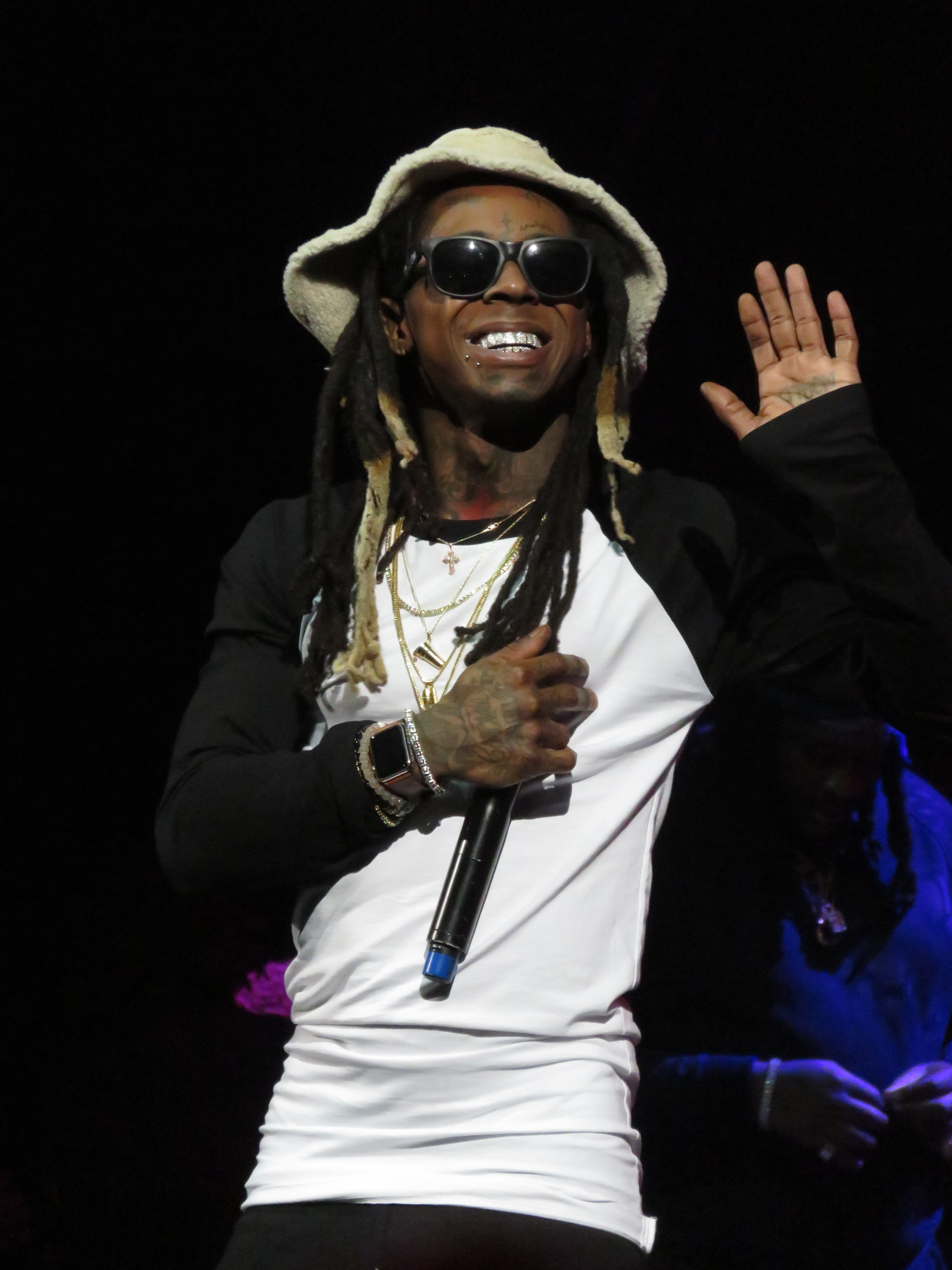
Hollygrove-native Lil Wayne at a concert

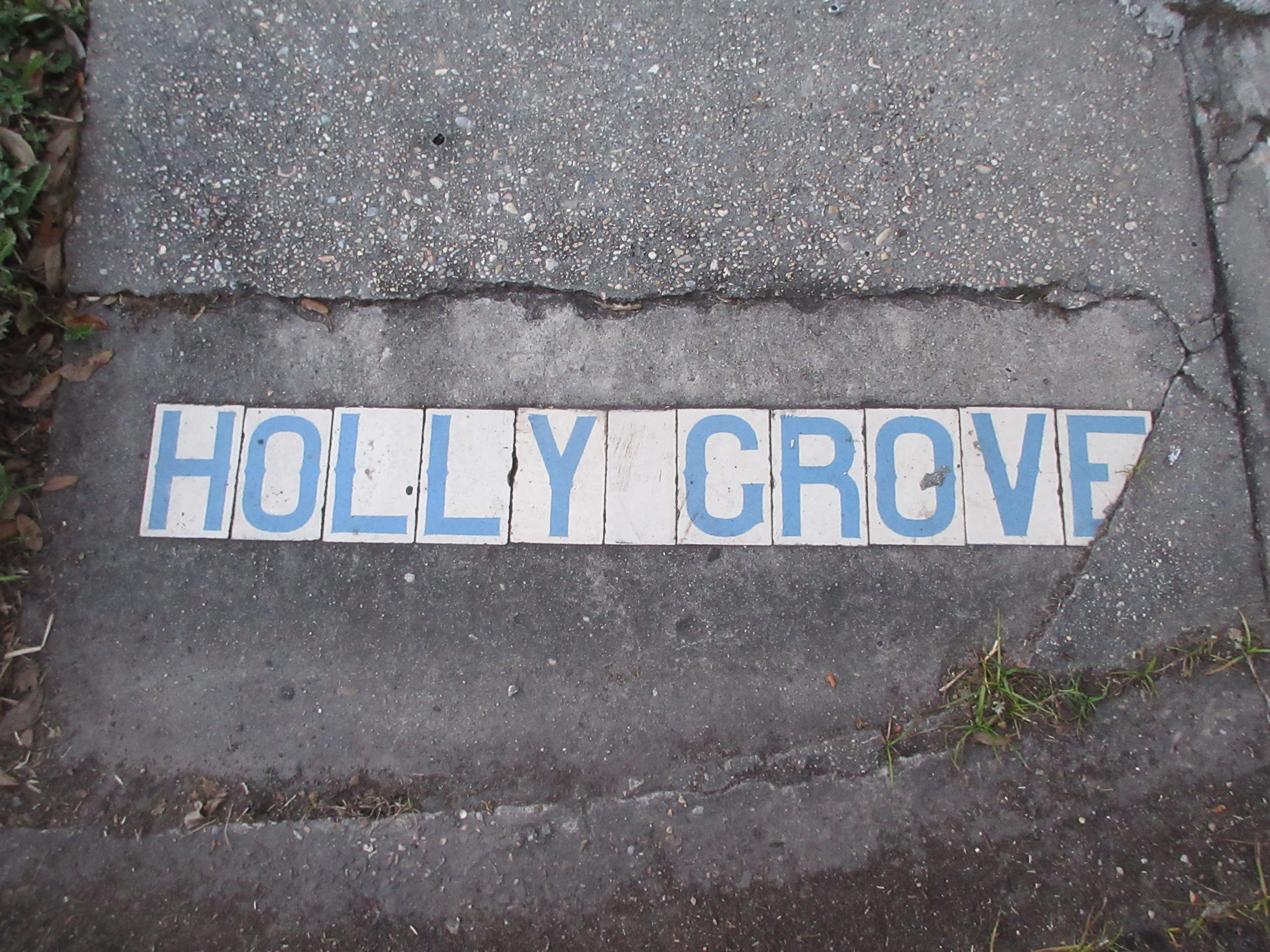

Hollygrove is a neighborhood of the city of New Orleans, Louisiana, located in the city's 17th Ward. A subdistrict of the Uptown/Carrollton area, the boundaries as defined by the New Orleans City Planning Commission are the following: Palmetto Street to the north, Cambronne, Edinburgh, Forshey, Fig and Leonidas Streets to the east, Earhart Boulevard to the south and the Jefferson Parish boundary to the west. Conrad playground, the Cuccia-Byrnes playground and Larry Gilbert baseball stadium are located in Hollygrove. The Hollygrove Market and Farm is also located in Hollygrove. Notable people including rapper Lil Wayne have grown up in the neighborhood.

== History ==
Hollygrove was once a piece of the McCarty plantation, grew out of the town of Carrollton, a suburb outside of New Orleans. Before the 1920s, when development began, Hollygrove was a low-lying swamp land, essentially untouched and unoccupied. Drainage systems installed in the 1920s allowed for housing to be built, although these systems never proved effective. In the 1960s, drainage methods were reworked to be more reliable, allowing for more housing to be developed. Even before effective drainage was implemented, Hollygrove grew drastically, the effects of which are still visible today. The Greater New Orleans Community Data Center that, pre-Katrina, nearly fifty percent of Hollygrove’s houses were built before 1949. Similarly, before Katrina, over half of the homes in Hollygrove were owner-occupied. When Hurricane Katrina breached the levees of New Orleans, Hollygrove began to flood, taking in water. Persevering, Hollygrove’s community has returned with great strength – the Louisiana State University survey on contractor fraud reported that Hollygrove/Gert Town’s recovery of residence was high; on a scale from 1 (lowest recovery of residence) to 11 (highest), Hollygrove and Gert Town were placed at a 9.

== Geography ==
Hollygrove is located at 29°57′57″N 90°07′16″W and has an elevation of 0 feet (0.0 m). According to the United States Census Bureau, the district has a total area of 0.62 square miles (1.6 km^{2}).

=== Adjacent neighborhoods ===
- Lakewood (north)
- Dixon (northeast)

=== Boundaries ===
The Greater New Orleans Community Data Center defines the boundaries of Hollygrove as highway I-10 to the north, Carrollton Avenue to the east, South Claiborne Avenue to the south, and Monticello Avenue to the west. The New Orleans City Planning Commission defines the boundaries of Hollygrove as these streets: Palmetto Street, Cambronne Street, Edinburgh Street, Forshey Street, Fig Street Leonidas Street, South Claiborne Avenue and the Monticello Canal. The Neighborhood defines its boundaries as S. Carrolltonn, S. Claiborne, Monticello (at the canal, Orleans/Jefferson Parish line) and Airline Highway. Earhart Blvd. runs through the neighborhood.

In the 1970s Hollygrove had been known to have a very high poverty, crime, and homicide rate. Shortly after crack cocaine hit the streets, NOPD waged war with drug dealers that dominated Hollygrove. By the 1980s and 1990s, gunfire was a constant fact of Hollygrove life. The overall crime rate in Hollygrove at the time was 136% higher than the national average. For every 100,000 people, there were 19.15 daily crimes that occurred in Hollygrove. The number of total year over year crimes in New Orleans had increased by 12%. However since the early 2000s the neighborhood has experienced a great deal of change and revitalization and crime rates have dropped dramatically. In the last decade, property values and new home construction have increased dramatically. The new and expansive Ochsner Medical Complex Campus is just over the Orleans/Jefferson Parish line and is a major employer.

== Demographics ==
As of the census of 2000, there were 6,919 people, 2,655 households, and 1,803 families residing in the neighborhood. The population density was 11,160 /mi^{2} (4,323 /km^{2}). As of the census of 2010, there were 4,377 people, 1,761 households, and 1,118 families residing in the neighborhood.

== Notable people ==
- Johnny Adams, R&B singer
- Theryl DeClouet, member of Galactic
- Fiend, rapper
- DJ Hollygrove, DJ
- Mack Maine, rapper
- Jason Mitchell, actor
- Partners-N-Crime, Rap duo
- Nesby Phips, producer, rapper and visual artist
- Johnny St. Cyr jazz composer, banjo, guitarist
- Lil Wayne, rapper

== Education ==
New Orleans Public Schools (NOPS) and the Recovery School District (RSD) operate public schools and handle charter schools in Hollygrove.

Mary McLeod Bethune Elementary School, a school under the NOPS, is located in Hollygrove. In 2005 there was a proposal to close the school. At the time the school had a performance score of 101 on a scale of 250 and the state gave it a two star rating, which was considered positive. In 2008, of the fourth grade students, about 4% of the fourth-grade students failed the LEAP tests. In the English test, 44% scored basic, 37% scored mastery, and 4% scored advanced. In 2009, no students failed the LEAP test. For that year, 7% scored basic, 79% scored mastery, and 14% scored advanced. In 2009 many art, drama, and music programs incorporate mathematics and reading lessons. During that year, according to principal Mary Haynes-Smith, most teachers at the school had at least 15 years of experience. Jarvis DeBerry of The Times-Picayune said in 2010 that the school had a "status as one of the best schools in New Orleans and the metropolitan area." In June 2010, NOPS gave the school an award for being a "High Performing/High Poverty School".

As of 2011 the Benjamin Banneker School was scheduled to move into the former Dunbar Elementary School site in Hollygrove. There were plans for a $22.3 million school building there.

== See also ==
- New Orleans neighborhoods
