= Dixon, New Orleans =

Dixon
- New Orleans Neighborhood
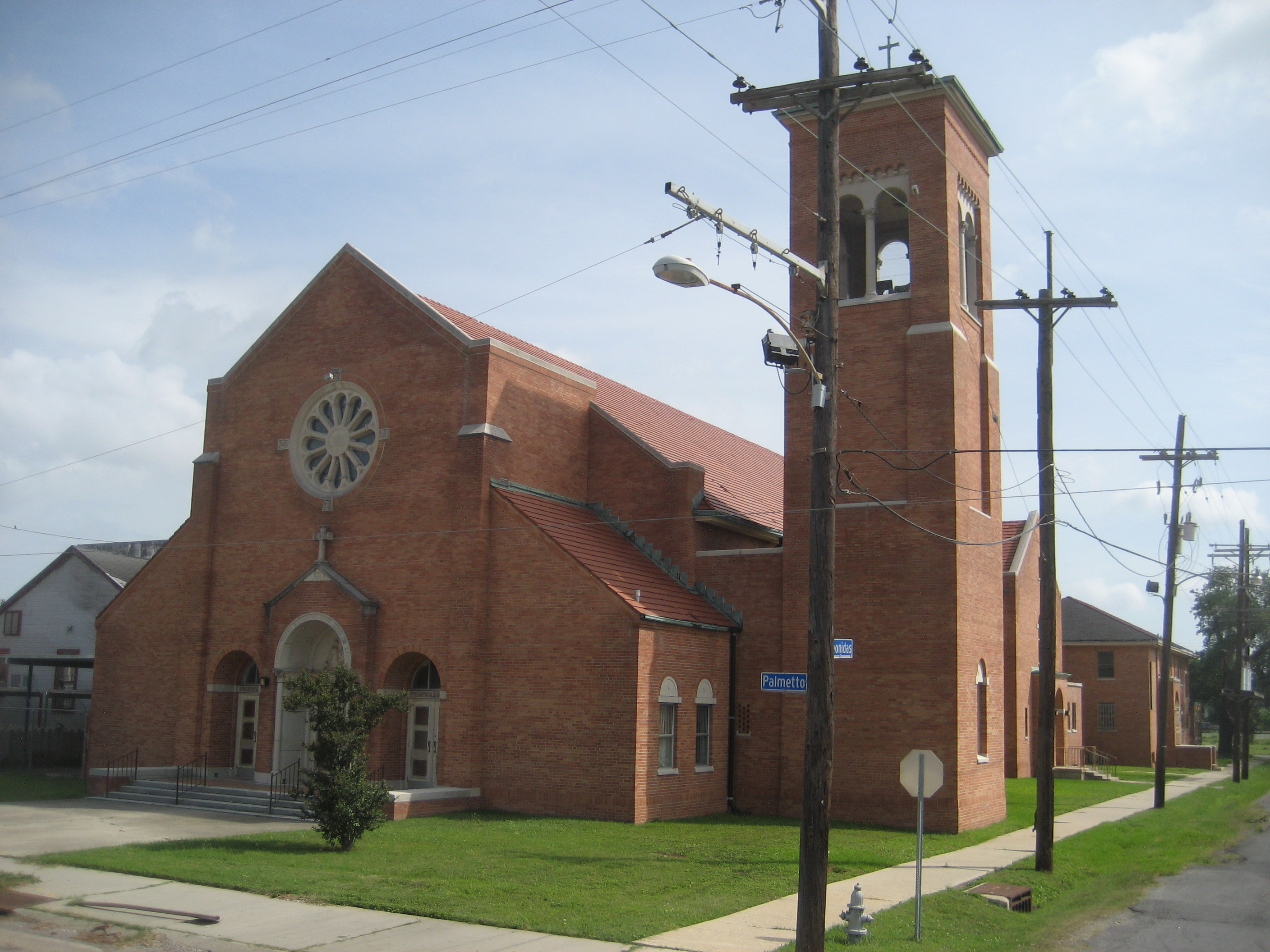
- St. Theresa Little Flower Church
- Interactive map of Dixon
- Coordinates: 29°58′16″N 90°06′49″W
- Country: United States
- State: Louisiana
- City: New Orleans
- Planning District: District 3, Uptown/Carrollton

Area
  - Total: 0.24 sq mi (0.62 km^{2})
  - Land: 0.24 sq mi (0.62 km^{2})
  - Water: 0.00 sq mi (0 km^{2})
- Elevation: 0 ft (0 m)

Population (2010)
  - Total: 565
  - Density: 2,400/sq mi (910/km^{2})
- Time zone: UTC-6 (CST)
  - Summer (DST): UTC-5 (CDT)
- Area code: 504

Dixon is a neighborhood of the city of New Orleans. A subdistrict of the Uptown/Carrollton Area, its boundaries as defined by the New Orleans City Planning Commission are: Interstate 10 to the northeast, South Carrollton Avenue to the southeast, Palmetto Street to the southwest and Cherry, Dixon, Mistletoe, Peach, Hamilton, Quince and Last Streets to the northwest.

== Geography ==
Dixon is located at 29°58′16″N 90°06′49″W and has an elevation of 0 feet (0.0 m). According to the United States Census Bureau, the district has a total area of 0.24 square miles (0.6 km^{2}). 0.24 square miles (0.6 km^{2}) of which is land and 0.00 square miles (0.0 km^{2}) (0.0%) of which is water.

=== Adjacent neighborhoods ===
- Lakewood (north)
- Mid-City (northeast)
- Gert Town (south)
- Hollygrove (southwest)

=== Boundaries ===
The New Orleans City Planning Commission defines the boundaries of Dixon as these streets: Interstate 10, South Carrollton Avenue, Palmetto Street, Cherry Street, Dixon Street, Mistletoe Street, Peach Street, Hamilton Street, Quince Street and Last Street.

== Demographics ==
As of the census of 2000, there were 1,772 people, 668 households, and 445 families living in the neighborhood. The population density was 7,383 /mi^{2} (2,953 /km^{2}). The racial makeup of the neighborhood was 94.9% African American, 3.2% White, 0.1% Asian, and 0.3% from two or more races. Hispanic or Latino of any race were 1.5% of the population.

As of the census of 2010, there were 1,270 people, 520 households, and 319 families living in the neighborhood. The racial makeup of the neighborhood was 90.3% African American, 6.0% White, 0.1% Asian, 0.2% American Indian, and 0.6% from two or more races. Hispanic or Latino of any race were 2.8% of the population.

== See also ==
- New Orleans neighborhoods
