= Spanish Fort (New Orleans) =

- Fort St. John
- U.S. National Register of Historic Places
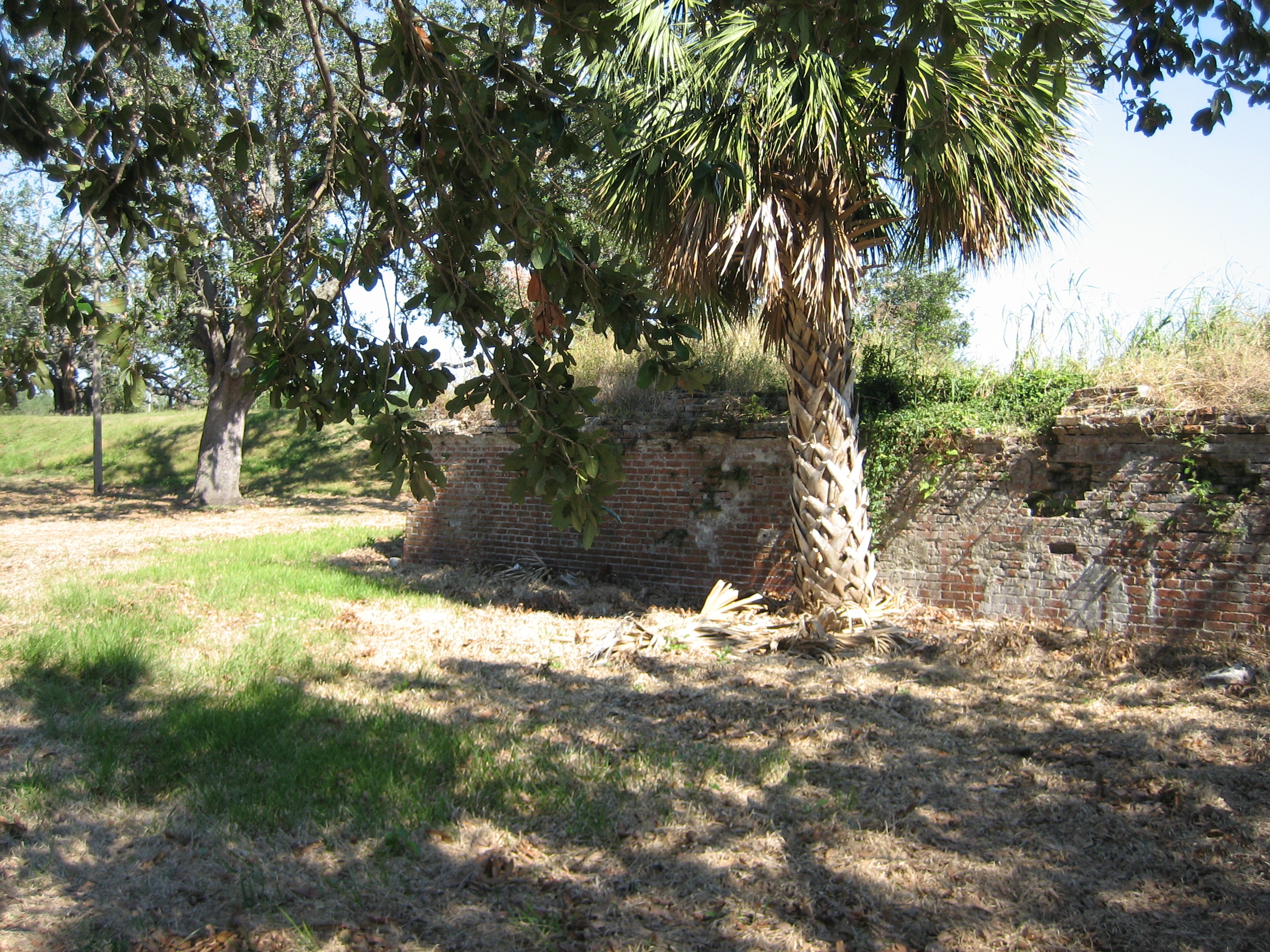
- Ruins of the Spanish Fort

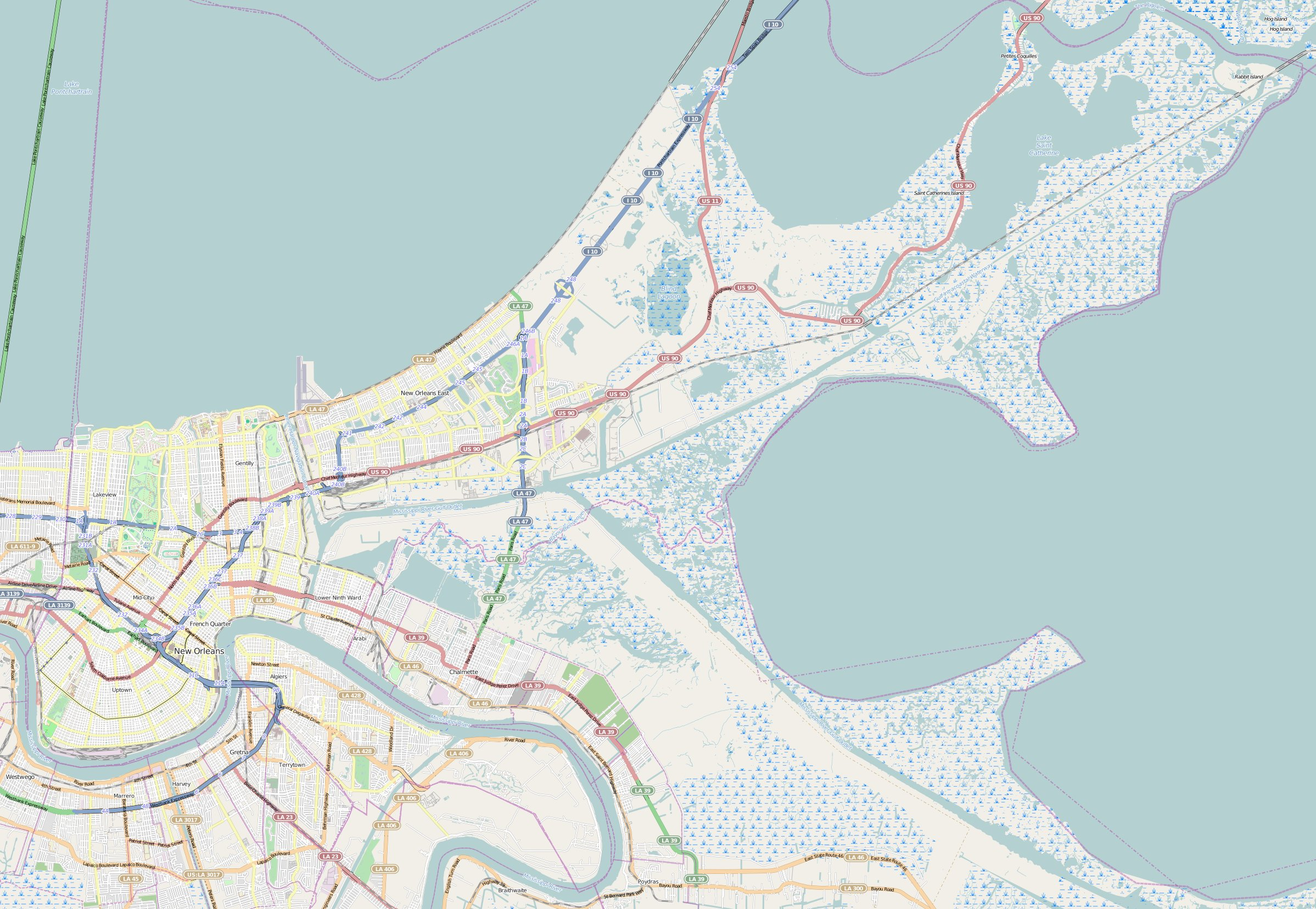
- Location within New Orleans Location within Louisiana Location within the United States
- Location: Bayou St. John off Allen Toussaint Boulevard., New Orleans, Louisiana
- Coordinates: 30°1′20″N 90°5′0″W
- Area: 0.2 acres (0.081 ha)
- Built: 1808
- NRHP reference No.: 83000530
- Added to NRHP: February 11, 1983

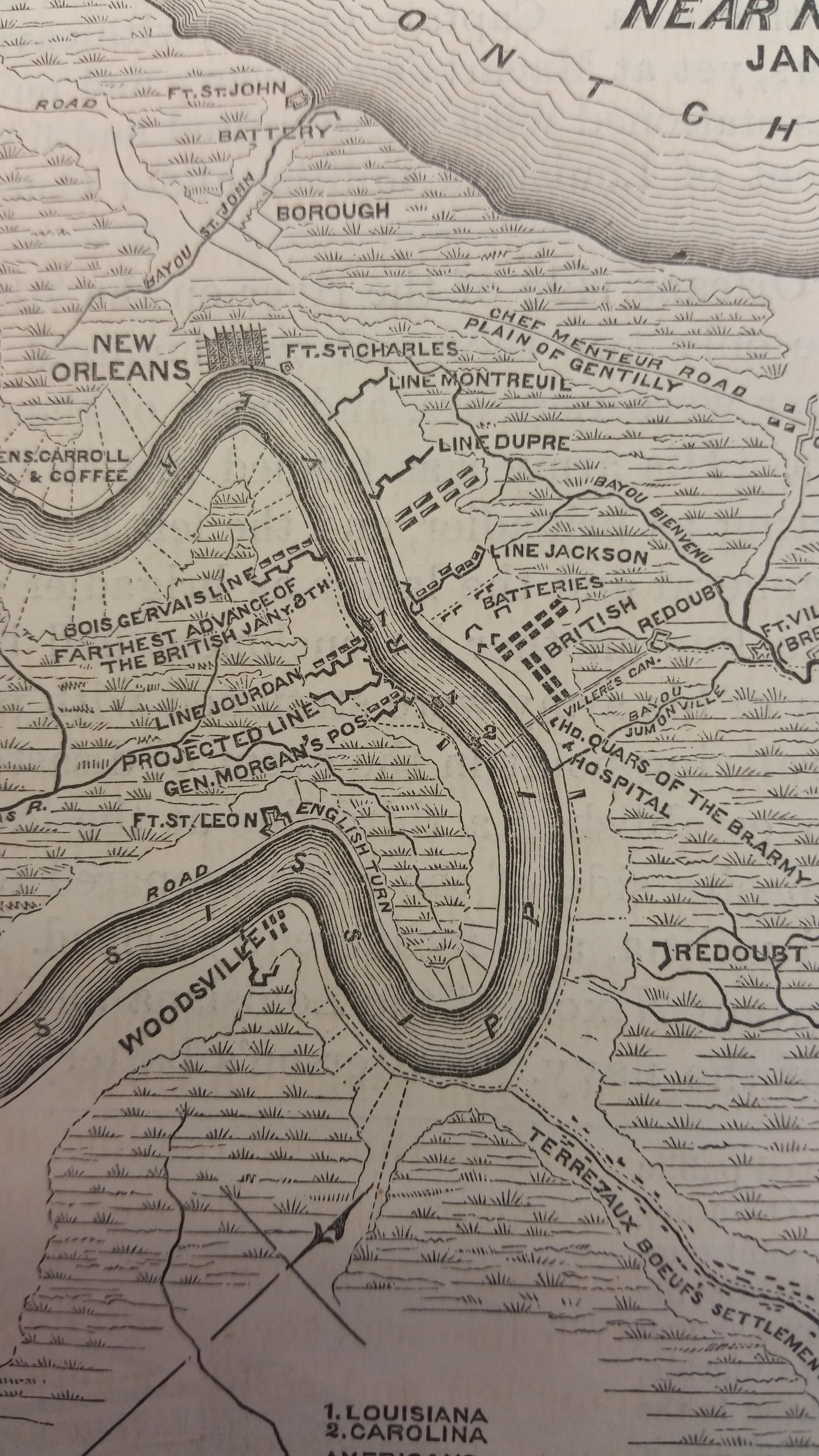
Fort St. John and Fort St. Charles, north and east of New Orleans respectively

Spanish Fort, also known as Old Spanish Fort, Fort St. Jean, and Fort St. John (Spanish: Fuerte de San Juan del Bayou), is a historic place in New Orleans, Louisiana, formerly the site of a fort and later an amusement park.

== Prehistory ==
Archaeological investigations have discovered that the fort location was a site of the Pre-Columbian Marksville culture dating back to circa 300 CE, with continued occupation afterwards. A large shell midden was used as the base under the early Colonial fort.

== The fort ==
The Colonial era fort protected the Lake Pontchartrain entrance of Bayou St. John. The first small fort here was erected by the French in 1701, before the founding of the city of New Orleans, to protect the important trade route along Bayou St. John. After Louisiana passed to Spanish control, a larger brick fort was constructed at the site of the neglected old French fortification; this was known as San Juan del Bayou. Louisiana passed back to France and then to the hands of the United States. The fort was decommissioned in 1823.

== From fort to amusement park ==
The land was bought by private developers, and became a popular amusement park, known as "Spanish Fort" or "Old Spanish Fort". It featured restaurants, a casino, a resort hotel, dancing pavilions, an alligator pond, and in its later decades amusement rides such as the "Scenic railway", a roller coaster. A steam railway, and later an electric streetcar system, connected the lakeside resort with the center of the city. It was especially popular during the summer for the cooling breezes of the Lake. It was billed as the "Coney Island of the South".

From about 1880 to 1908 the small iron submarine now in the collection of the Louisiana State Museum was on display here, identified as the Confederate war submarine "Pioneer". (Recent investigations have called the traditional identification into question, making the curious early submarine even more of a mystery; see: Bayou St. John submarine.)

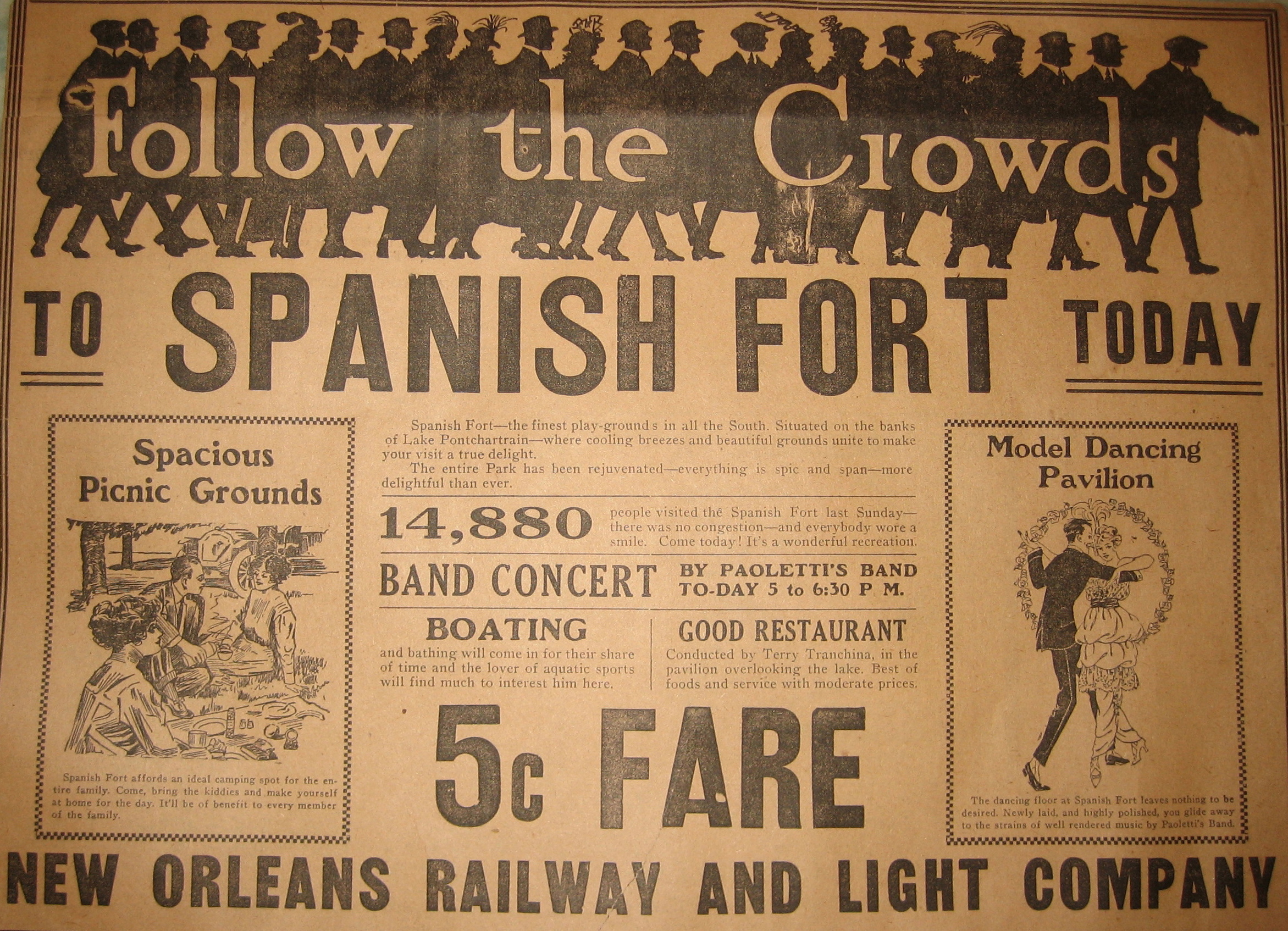
A 1919 newspaper advertisement brags "14,880 people visited the Spanish Fort last Sunday – there was no congestion – and everybody wore a smile."

"Over the Rhine", a German restaurant and beer garden, was a popular attraction, as were dances by Paoletti's Orchestra. Tranchina's Restaurant and Brown's Ice Cream Parlor often featured live bands. The park had two cabarets, "Tokyo Gardens" and "The Frolics".

In the park's later decades, a number of early jazz bands played here. Armand J. Piron's New Orleans Orchestra was a regular; Papa Celestin's band filled in while Piron was in New York. Pianist Steve Lewis performed not only with Piron's band, but also did solos and duets with singer New Orleans Willie Jackson. Johnny Bayersdorffer's Jazzola Novelty Orchestra and Johnny Miller's New Orleans Frolicers were also regulars.

== End of the amusement park ==
Starting in the late 1920s, a project reclaimed land from Lake Pontchartrain, extending the shoreline out away from the old fort. The city's main amusement park became Pontchartrain Beach.

In 1938, the location was converted into a public park. The name ″Spanish Fort″ was used because the only thing known about its history at the time was that it had been built by the Spanish.

The site of Spanish Fort, mostly a brick ruin, can still be seen along the upper side of the Bayou just back from Allen Toussaint Boulevard, adjacent to what is now the "Floral Park" section of the Lake Vista neighborhood.
