= Boat racing =

Racing using boats

Boat racing (Regatta) is a sport in which boats, or other types of watercraft, race on water. Boat racing powered by oars is recorded as having occurred in ancient Egypt, and it is likely that people have engaged in races involving boats and other water-borne craft for as long as such watercraft have existed.

A regatta is a series of boat races. The term comes from the Venetian language, with regata meaning "contest, contention for mastery"(from regatare ("compete, haggle, sell at retail"), possibly from recatare) and typically describes racing events of rowed or sailed water craft, although some powerboat race series are also called regattas. A regatta often includes social and promotional activities which surround the racing event, and except in the case of boat type (or "class") championships, is usually named for the town or venue where the event takes place; for example “valley field”.

One of the largest and most popular rowing regattas is the Henley Royal Regatta held on the River Thames, England. One of the largest and oldest yachting regattas in the world is Cowes Week, which is held annually by the Royal Yacht Squadron in Cowes, England, and usually attracts over 900 sailing boats. Cowes Week is predated by the Cumberland Cup (1775), Port of Dartmouth Royal Regatta (1822) and Port of Plymouth Regatta (1823). North America's oldest regatta is the Royal St. John's Regatta held on Quidi Vidi Lake in St. John's, Newfoundland every year since 1818.

== Rowing ==
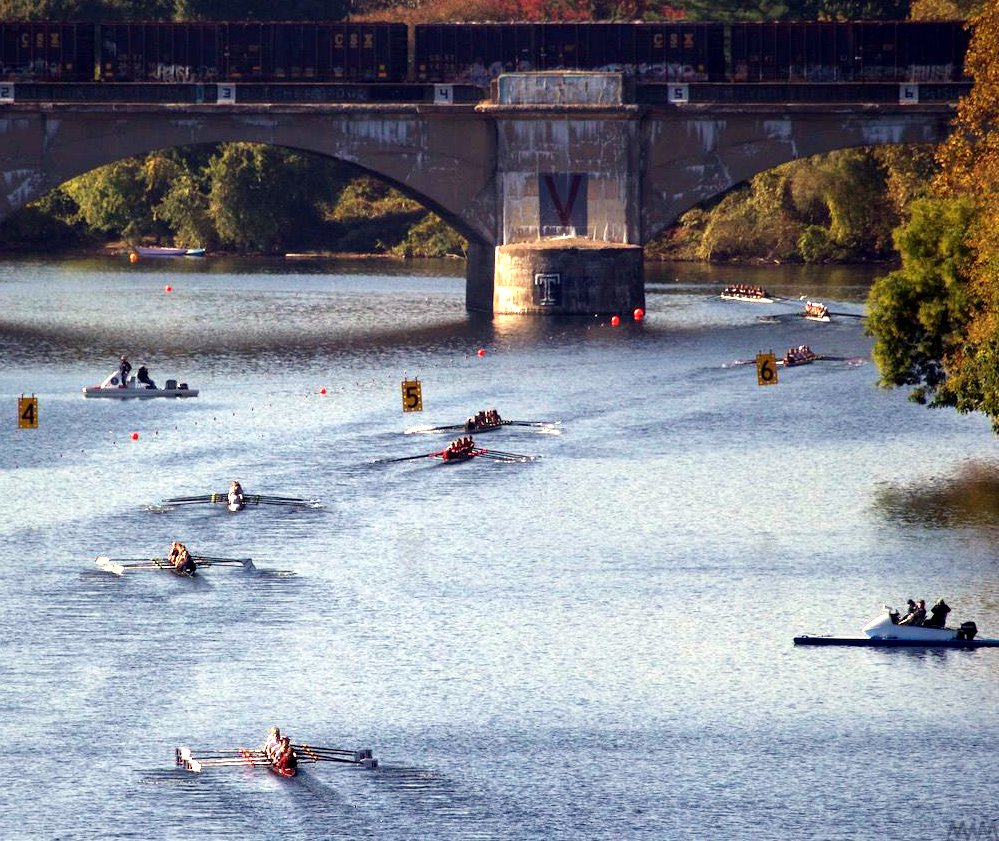
The Head of the Schuylkill Regatta

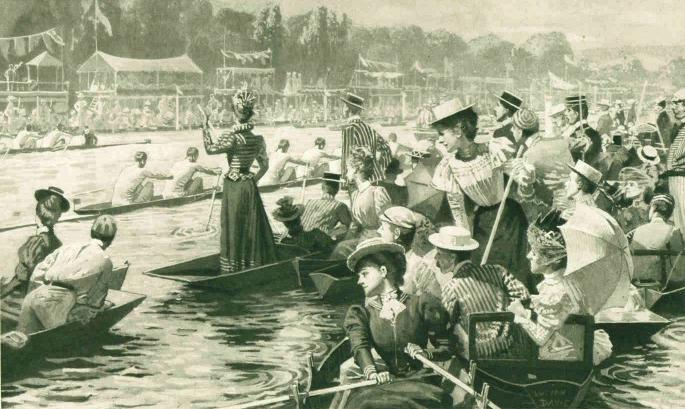
Rowing, by Lucien Davis, 1898.

=== World Rowing Federation championship events ===
- World Rowing Cup
- World Rowing Championships
- World Rowing Junior Championships
- World Rowing Under 23 Championships
- European Rowing Championships

=== North America ===
==== United States ====
- American Henley Regatta, first world championships in the United States
- Dad Vail Regatta, Philadelphia, Pennsylvania, championships for college clubs
- The Harvard–Yale Regatta – also known as 'The Race'
- Head of the Charles Regatta, on the Charles River between Boston and Cambridge, Massachusetts
- Head of the Hooch, on the Tennessee River in Chattanooga, Tennessee
- Intercollegiate Rowing Association National Championships, college championships for men and lightweight women
- Marathon Rowing Championship a continuous 42.195-kilometre (26.219 mi) rowing regatta on Cane River Lake in Natchitoches, Louisiana
- New England Interscholastic Rowing Association Championships
- Poughkeepsie Regatta was an historical regatta that hosted the IRA National Championship from 1895 until 1949.
- Scholastic Rowing Association of America Championships
- USRowing National Championships
- The Windermere Cup - between the University of Washington and one or several challengers of their choice
- San Diego Crew Classic – Mission Bay, San Diego, California. Founded in 1973, it is the inaugural race of the rowing season among rowers of all genders, levels, and abilities.

==== Canada ====
- The Brentwood Regatta is held in the spring and is one of the largest high school rowing regattas on the west coast of North America.
- Royal Canadian Henley Regatta, in St. Catharines, Ontario, Canada, in the first week of August is one of the largest annual regattas in North America, attracting hundreds of clubs in 128 junior, senior, and master's events.
- Royal St. John's Regatta, held every year on Quidi Vidi Lake in St. John's, Newfoundland, North America's oldest annual sporting event.
- Dominion Day Regatta, held every year since 1884 in Toronto, Ontario, Canada. The oldest and largest combined paddling and rowing regatta for participants across North America.

=== Europe ===
==== United Kingdom ====
- Regattas on the River Thames lists all Thames rowing regattas and other rowing events
- The Boat Race is a rowing race between the Oxford University Boat Club and the Cambridge University Boat Club. It is rowed annually each Spring on the Thames in London.
- Henley Royal Regatta, held every year on the River Thames is one of several prestigious British events
- Lent and May Bumps, the two main intercollegiate bumps races of the University of Cambridge, held on the Cam.
- The National Schools Regatta is the largest regatta for junior rowers in Great Britain
- The Boat Race of the North – between the University of Durham and the University of Newcastle
- Port of Dartmouth Royal Regatta, held annually at the end of August on the River Dart.
- Summer Eights, along with Torpids, the two intercollegiate bumps races of Oxford University, held on the Isis in Oxford.
- The Welsh Boat Race is a rowing race between the Swansea University Rowing Club and the Cardiff University Boat Club. It is rowed annually each Spring on the Taff River or the River Tawe in South Wales.
- The City of Exeter Rowing Regatta, the oldest rowing regatta in the South West, is held annually in Exeter in July.

==== Continental Europe ====
- Regata delle Antiche Repubbliche Marinare, Italy
- The Croco's Cup, international rowing regatta at University level held every year in Paris since 1985, organised by students of ENSTA (Paristech).
- Tour du Lac, around the lake Geneva is the 160 km (99 mi) the longest non-stop rowing regatta in the world.
- Kontxako Bandera, rowing regatta in San Sebastián, Basque Country.
- Vienna Nightrow is an international sprint rowing regatta for eights in Austria at night.
- The Danube Regatta / Dunai Regatta Hungary's largest university rowing race, held annually on the Danube in Budapest.
- Balaton Regatta, held every year on the Lake Balaton between the teams of Veszprém Campus and Keszthely Campus of University of Pannonia
- Maltese National Regatta, held bi-annually on 31 March and 8 September in the Grand Harbour, Valletta
- Varsity, student race held annually on the Amsterdam-Rhine canal over 3 km (1.85 mi).
- Koninklijke Holland Beker, held annually on the Bosbaan in the single sculls.
- Dragon boat racing – a type of human-powered watercraft racing, originating from oriental Asia
- Canoe racing – competitive forms of canoeing and kayaking
  - Kayak racing
  - Outrigger canoe racing

== Sailing ==
Sailing race events are typically held for a single one design class and usually last more than one day. Regattas may be hosted by a yacht club, sailing association, town or school as in the case of the UK's National School Sailing Association and Interscholastic Sailing Association (high school) regattas or Intercollegiate Sailing Association (college) regattas.

The Barcolana regatta of the yacht club Società Velica di Barcola e Grignano is currently the Guinness world record holder as the "largest sailing race" with 2,689 boats and over 16,000 sailors at the starting line. Currently, The Three Bridge Fiasco, conducted by the Singlehanded Sailing Society of San Francisco Bay with more than 350 competitors, is the largest sailboat race in the United States.

=== Types ===
- Yacht racing – the sport of competitive yachting
  - Team racing – also known as teams racing, is a popular form of yacht racing
- 2025 ISAF Team Racing World Championship: Hosted 28 May–1 June 2025 by the New York Yacht Club in Newport, using a new 2-v-2 keelboat format.
- 2025 29er World Championship: Held 1–8 August 2025 in Porto, Portugal, with over 250 two-person dinghy teams.

=== Oldest sailing regattas ===
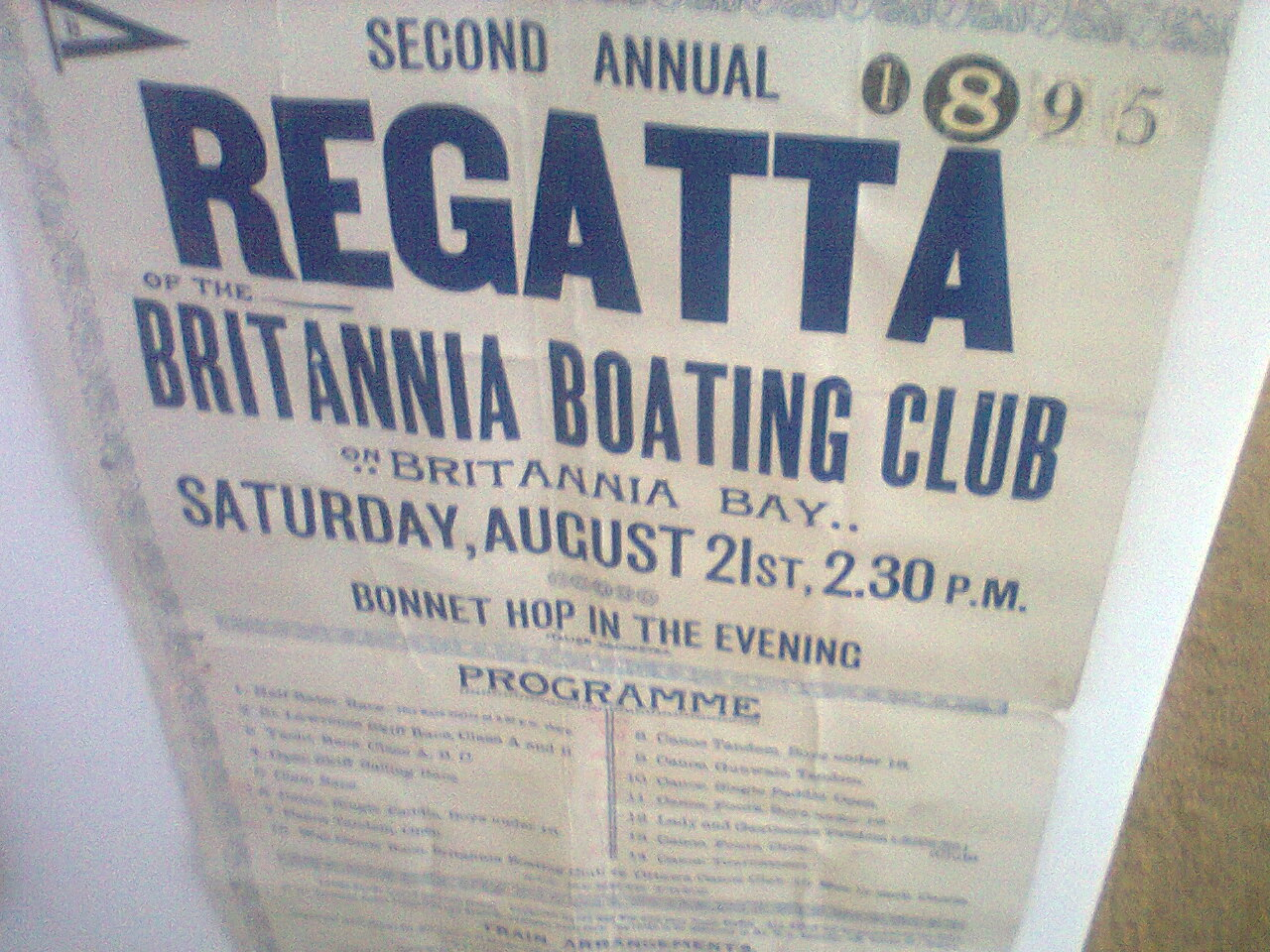
Britannia Boating Club Regatta 1895

- 1775 – Cumberland Cup, organised by the Royal Thames Yacht Club, UK
- 1777 – Lough Ree Regatta, organised by Athlone Yacht Club, Ireland.
- 1792 – Whitstable Regatta UK
- 1822 – Port of Dartmouth Royal Regatta, Dartmouth, UK
- 1823 – Port of Plymouth Regatta, Plymouth, UK
- 1826 – Cowes Week, Isle of Wight, UK
- 1828 – Kingstown Regatta, (now renamed Dún Laoghaire), Ireland
- 1828 – Royal Harwich Regatta, Harwich, UK
- 1834 – Lough Derg Regatta, at Killaloe, Williamstown and Drumineer, Ireland.
- 1837 – Sydney Australia Day Regatta, held every year since 1837, the longest running without a break
- 1838 – Royal Hobart Regatta, Australia
- 1840 – Auckland Anniversary Regatta, New Zealand
- 1844 – Royal Geelong Regatta / Audi Victoria Week, Royal Geelong Yacht Club, Australia
- 1845 – New York Yacht Club Regatta, United States
- 1849 – Pass Christian Regatta Club on July 21, 1849; twelve boats participated. First regatta on the U.S. Gulf Coast
- 1849 – Sandy Bay Australia Day Regatta Australia
- 1850 – Race to the Coast, Southern Yacht Club Regatta. Oldest continuously running regatta in the Western Hemisphere United States
- 1851 – America's Cup, usually competed for in the country of the current defender/holder
- 1851 – Port Esperance Regatta, Australia
- 1856 – Chester Race Week, Nova Scotia, Canada
- 1857 – Gorey Regatta, Jersey, Channel Islands
- 1879 – Kontxako Bandera, San Sebastián, Basque Country
- 1882 – Kiel Week, Kiel, Germany
- 1885 – Appledore & Instow Regatta, North Devon, UK
- 1886 – Torbay Royal Regatta, Torbay, UK
- 1894 – Britannia Boating Club, Ottawa, Canada
- 1934 – The Kékszalag/Blue Ribbon, Europe's oldest Round-the-Lake Regatta held annually on Lake Balaton, Hungary.

=== Current sailing regattas ===
- Aegean Rally, Aegean Sea, Greece
- America's Cup, hosted by prior winner
- The Athlone Yacht Club Regatta on Lough Ree, Ireland
- Appledore & Instow Regatta – founded in 1885, tracing its origins back to 1831, is held annually on the River Torridge between the Villages of Appledore & Instow North Devon, UK.
- Auckland Anniversary Regatta held annually on the Waitemata Harbour to celebrate Auckland Anniversary Day
- Balmain Regatta held annually on Sydney Harbour, Australia
- Barcolana Autumn Cup Regatta, one of the largest single start sailing regattas in the world, held annually on the second Sunday of October in Trieste, Italy
- Bass Week, Bassenthwaite Lake, Cumbria
- Bay Week, Put-in-Bay, Ohio
- Block Island Race Week, Rhode Island
- The Kékszalag/Blue Ribbon, Europe's oldest Round-the-Lake Regatta held annually on Lake Balaton, Hungary.
- Canada's Cup, held periodically on the Great Lakes.
- Canadian Olympic-training Regatta, Kingston (CORK) held annually in August in Kingston, Ontario Canada.
- Carriacou Regatta Festival, Hillsborough, Carriacou, Grenada. W.I. - First weekend in August each year.
- CASON Grand Prize Solo Regatta, Lake Balaton, Hungary, held annually in September.
- Charleston Race Week, Charleston, South Carolina, held each April for three days, with races staged both in Charleston Harbor and offshore.
- Chester Race Week, Chester, Nova Scotia, Canada, 15 keelboat fleets race for 4 full days on 5 courses in mid-August on Mahone Bay
- Chicago Yacht Club Race to Mackinac, held annually in July, starting in Chicago on Lake Michigan and ending at Mackinac Island on Lake Huron.
- Columbus Day Regatta, Miami, Florida, annually in October.
- Chichester-Cowes Challenge, held annually at the end of June on the Solent, and welcomes only classic wooden boats, mainly built in the 1920s–1930s.
- The Clipper Round the World Yacht Race
- Cork Week, Cork, Ireland. Hosted by the Royal Cork Yacht Club bi-annually.
- Cowes Week, Royal Yacht Squadron, England
- Dún Laoghaire Regatta, Ireland, combined Dún Laoghaire Yacht Clubs, held Biannually.
- Færderseilasen, Royal Norwegian Yacht Club (KNS), from Oslo to Horten via Færder lighthouse.
- The Fastnet Race
- Figawi Race, Hyannis, Massachusetts
- Fowey Royal Regatta, Fowey Cornwall annually in August
- Hangon Regatta, an annual event in the city of Hanko, Finland, infamous for attracting large groups of partying youths with a tangential interest in the sailing itself
- Harvest Moon Regatta, Lakewood Yacht Club in Seabrook Texas hosts cruisers regatta during full moon in October each year from Galveston to Port Aransas
- Kamer 2 Sailing Marathon, Kaag, Netherlands, annually in September
- Key West Race Week, Key West, Florida
- Kékszalag, Balatonfüred, Hungary annually in July
- Kiel Week, Kiel/Germany - the largest sailing event in the world
- Lake Ontario 300, Port Credit, Ontario - the longest fresh-water sailboat race in the world, held annually in July
- Larchmont Race Week, Larchmont Yacht Club, New York
- Lighthouse Regatta, Lake Hefner hosted by the Oklahoma City Boat Club
- Long Beach Race Week, Long Beach, California
- Louis Vuitton Trophy, a world series of regattas, multiple locations
- Lysekil Women's Match, Lysekil, Sweden, annually in August
- Mardi Gras Race Week, New Orleans Yacht Club, large One Design regatta held on Lake Pontchartrain
- MidsummerSail, annual sailing regatta from the southernmost to the northernmost point of the Baltic Sea
- Monsoon regatta Monsoon Regatta India
- Mrduja Regatta, an annual regatta held in the city of Split, Croatia
- National Offshore One Design (NOOD)
- New World Regatta, held every year between the ports of Koper, Slovenia and Baltimore, Maryland.
- Port Huron to Mackinac Boat Race, Mighigan
- Port of Dartmouth Royal Regatta, held annually at the end of August over three days on the River Dart.
- Race to the Coast, Southern Yacht Club, New Orleans, Louisiana to Gulfport, Mississippi
- Regatta Vava'u held annually in Vava'u, Kingdom of Tonga in September
- Rotary Club of Sydney Cove Charity Regatta held annually since 1995 on the second Friday of November at the Cruising Yacht Club of Australia
- Round Texel, Texel, Netherlands, annually in June
- Sail Melbourne, Held annually on Melbourne's Port Phillip Bay
- Sawadee.com Regatta Samui, Thailand, Annually on the island of Koh Samui, Thailand in June
- Sint Maarten Classic Yacht Regatta, Sint Maarten, held last weekend of March
- Sint Maarten Heineken Regatta, Sint Maarten, annually in March
- Sugar Bowl Regatta, New Orleans Yacht Club, New Orleans, Louisiana
- Tall Ships Race
- Tjörn Runt, Tjörn, Sweden, annually in August
- Travemünde Week, Travemünde, Germany, annually in July
- United Sailing Week, Croatia. The biggest sailing regatta and yachting event in Croatia. 50 boats in 4 classes and 500 participants.
- The Velux 5 Oceans Race – a round-the-world, staged, single-handed yacht race; originally known as the 'BOC Challenge', and then the 'Around Alone'
- The Vendee Globe – a round-the-world, non-stop, single-handed yacht race
- Vintage Yachting Games, each time in another country first in 2008, Medemblik, The Netherlands since then every four years. 2012 Lake Como Italy
- Voiles de Saint-Tropez, Saint-Tropez, France, annually in October
- The Volvo Ocean Race
- Washington's Birthday Regatta, at the Barnacle Historic State Park, Coconut Grove, Florida, annually in February
- West Highland Yachting Week, Oban, W Coast Scotland
- Whale of a Sail, Carlyle Sailing Association, Carlyle, IL
- Whiskeytown Regatta, Whiskeytown Lake—Redding, CA
- Youngstown Levels, Youngstown, New York
- Chichester Biarritz Challenge, Chichester, England, to Biarritz, France, annually in April.

=== School sailing regattas ===
- Mallory Cup, United States high school sailing national championships.
- Nixor College, the first college in Pakistan to launch a 'RAFT' regatta for team building.
- Royal College Colombo and S. Thomas' College, Mt. Lavinia, Oldest Regatta in Sri Lanka. (Royal Thomian Regatta)
- Sywoc, the Student Yachting World Cup organized by the students of the École Polytechnique.
- The NSSA National Youth Regatta is the largest dinghy sailing regatta and the largest youth sailing regatta in the UK. Due to its size the NYR visits a new location each year alternating between coastal and inland venues. Previous years venues include Bridlington (North Yorkshire), Datchet Sailing Club (West London) Plymouth (Devon), Redcar (North East England), Deal (Kent), Grafham Water (Cambridgeshire), Weymouth (Dorset) to name just a few.

=== University / college sailing regattas ===
- Charleston Open, College of Charleston
- Fisher Hall Regatta, University of Notre Dame
- Intercollegiate Sailing Association National Championships, various locations
- Kennedy Cup, US Naval Academy
- The Roth Regatta, Roth Pond, State University of New York at Stony Brook
- The Regent Regatta, Regent Pond, Regent University
- The CoEP Regatta, Mula River, College of Engineering, Pune - Held annually in March (since 1928), one of the oldest and most celebrated regattas in India
- Mustang Open Regatta, Cal Poly San Luis Obispo

== Motorboat racing ==
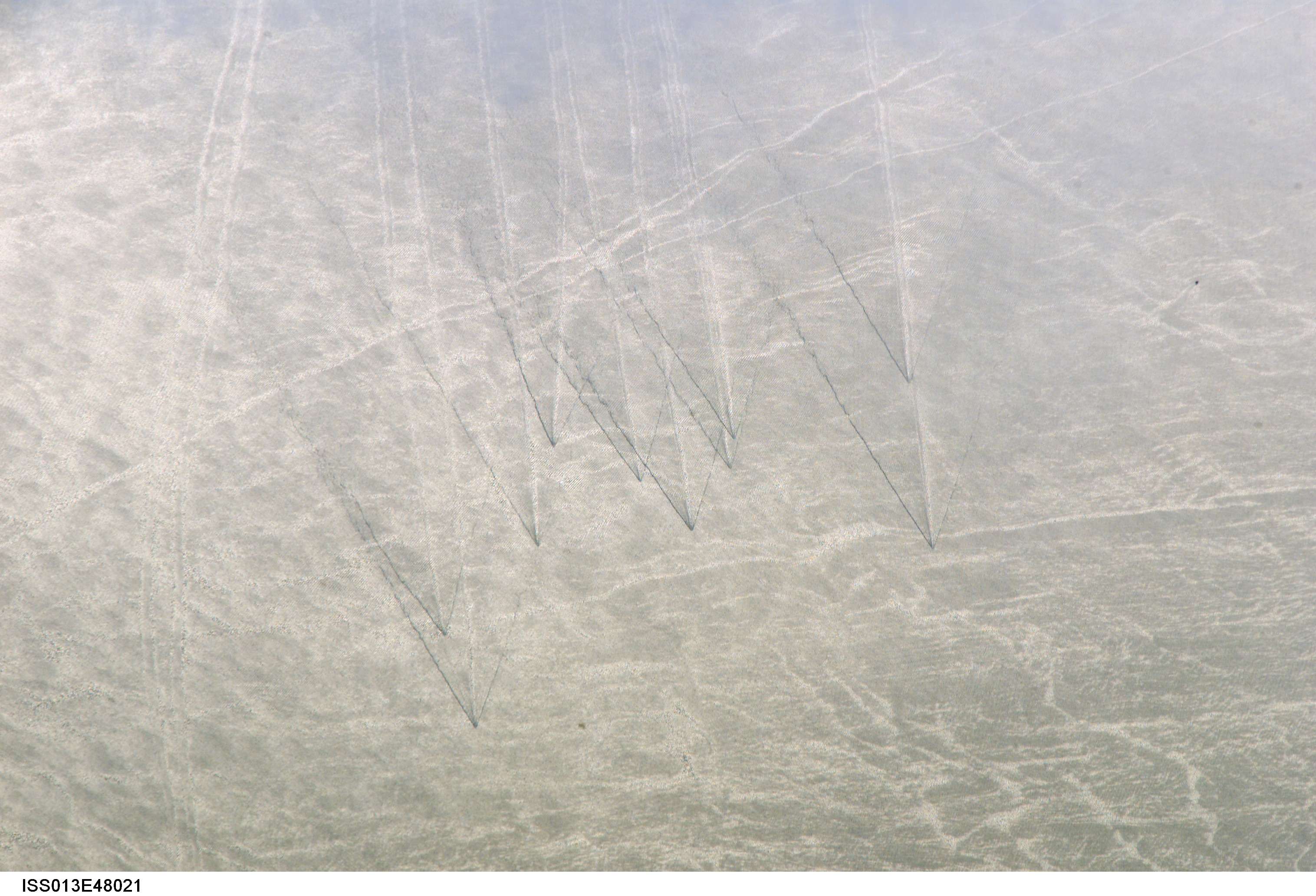
A boat race seen from the International Space Station, 2006

- 24 Heures Motonautiques de Rouen – a 24-hour circuit boat race in Rouen, France
- Archer eade memorial – an unlimited outboard race consisting of six laps
- APBA Gold Cup – an unlimited hydroplane race in the H1 Unlimited series. It is the oldest trophy in motorsports.
- Inshore powerboat racing – and within this category, the F1 Powerboat World Championship
- Offshore powerboat racing – racing by large, specially designed ocean-going powerboats promoted by Offshore Racing Organization
- XCAT Racing – a sport involving Extreme Catamarans or XCATs; XCAT Racing is promoted by the World Professional Powerboating Association (WPPA) and governed by the Union Internationale Motonautique (UIM)
- Drag boat racing – a form of drag racing which takes place on water rather than land
- Hydroplane racing – a sport involving racing hydroplanes on lakes and rivers
- Jet sprint boat racing
- Swamp buggy racing – although not technically classed as boats, these specialist craft race tri-annually on swampy area circuits in the Florida region
- Bathtub racing

== Other notable regattas and boat races ==
- Stuart Sailfish Regatta, Stuart, FL. Boat classes; Jersey Skiffs, Inboard and outboard Hydroplanes, Grand Prix Series
- Beer Can Regatta, boats made from aluminium cans in Darwin, NT, Australia.
- Madison Regatta, Madison, Indiana. (hydroplanes)
- Kingston Multi-Hull Regatta, Kingston, Ontario (multihull sailboats and sailing hydrofoils)
- Henley-on-Todd Regatta - an Australian dry-land event.
- Hidden Lake Regatta, Columbus, Ohio. Sponsored in July each year by the Hidden Lake Yacht Club, featuring 8 non-motorized divisions.
- Musi Triboatton – an annually occurring international boat race across more than 500 km of Musi River in South Sumatra, Indonesia
- Royal Hobart Regatta - a multiple event 3 day regatta in Tasmania, Australia.
- The Nehru Trophy Boat Race – One of the traditional Snake Boat Races (Vallam kali) that takes place in Alleppey, Kerala, India
- Sy Barash Regatta - discontinued event at Penn State
- Worrell 1000, between South Beach and Virginia Beach, Virginia
- Toronto International Dragon Boat Race Festival, Toronto, Ontario
- Drina Regatta is the most visited tourist and recreation manifestation and the central event in the Western Serbia
- The 826LA Paddle Boat Regatta, Los Angeles, CA (paddle boats)

== Race format types ==
- Kyōtei – parimutuel boat racing in Japan, referred to as "BOAT RACE"
- Match race – a race between two competitors, going head-to-head

== See also ==
- Boat race (disambiguation)
- Rowing at the Summer Olympics and Sailing at the Summer Olympics, often collectively referred to as the Olympic Regatta.
- Cowes Week
- Category:Sailing competitions
