= St Anne's College Boat Club =

British rowing club

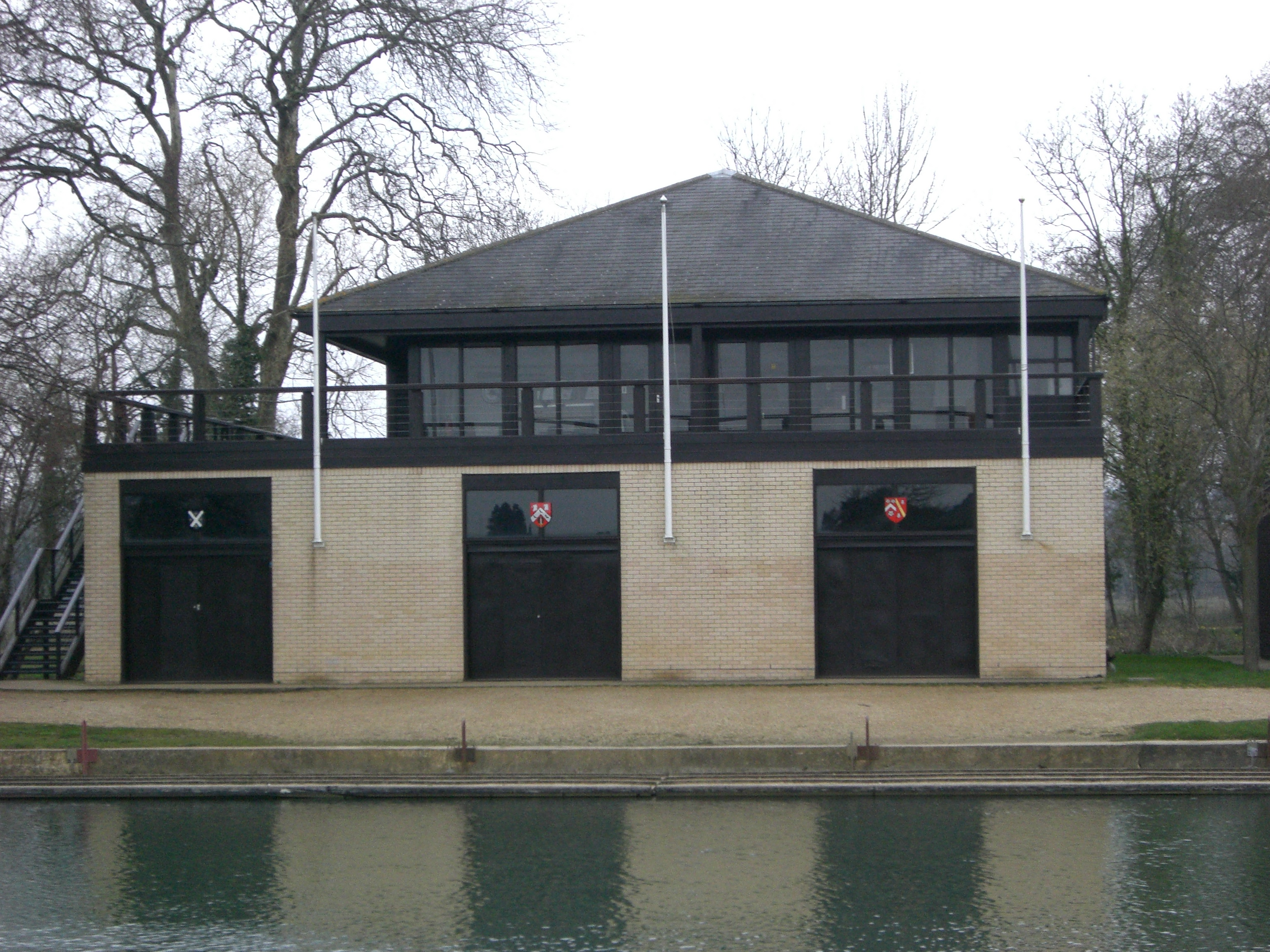

- Boathouse (centre) (building shared with Wadham & St Hugh's)
- Motto: Good company, fast boats
- Location: Boathouse Island, Christ Church Meadow, Oxford, Oxford
- Coordinates: 51.744008°N 1.250652°W
- Home water: The Isis
- Founded: 1908
- Former names: Oxford Home Students Rowing Club
- Key people: Ben O'Donnell (president)
- University: University of Oxford
- Affiliations: British Rowing (boat code SAC); Murray Edwards College Boat Club (Sister college)
- Website: stannesboatclub.weebly.com

St Anne's College Boat Club (SABC) is a rowing club for members of St Anne's College, Oxford. It is based on the Isis at Boathouse Island, Christ Church Meadow, Oxford, Oxford.

== History ==
St Anne's students have been rowing since at least the 1890s. The two earliest photographs held by the college, that of the Oxford Home-Students (the predecessor to St Anne's College) were both taken on the river. The history of SABC since then is a long path that traces the formation of St Anne's College, the acquisition of a fleet, the fundraising and construction of the Boathouse, and the rise of the first Eight's to reach 1st Division (women) and 2nd Division (men).

St Anne's students made up many of the women who rowed in the early women's boat races which started in 1927. The first women's representative in the Boat Race was D. Morely, who rowed at the bow position in the pioneering inaugural race in 1927.

Originally the boat club was restricted to an allocated space within the St John's College boathouse. In 1985 new boathouse plans were submitted with the help of a major donation from Peter de Savary. The boathouse was subsequently built in 1989/90, on a plot next to many other University boathouses on Boathouse Island. Current president is Ben O'Donnell. The boathouse building is in three sections and shared with Wadham College Boat Club and St Hugh's Boat Club with St Annes's in the centre section.

In 2003, the club's first men's representative in the Boat Race was Matt Smith.

== Honours ==
=== Boat Race representatives ===
The following rowers were part of the rowing club at the time of their participation in The Boat Race.

Men's boat race

Year	Name
2003	Matt J. Smith
2006	Paul Daniels
2011	Ben Ellison

Women's boat race

Year	Name
1927	D. Morely
1929	Montgomery
1929	Cattle
1929	Fenning
1929	Hammond
1929	Francombe
1934	M. Morant
1934	M. C. Heathcote
1934	A. Ebrand
1934	L. M. Bristowe
1934	S. Aldwinckle
1934	L. Priestly
1934	K. L. Box

Year	Name
1936	E. Johnstone
1936	M. Beale
1936	B. George
1936	M. Lovegrove
1936	P. Dolby
1936	P. Walker
1936	L. Dillon
2019	Amelia Standing
2021	Amelia Standing
2022	Christine Cavallo
2022	Amelia Standing
2022	Joe Gellet (cox)
2023	Esther Austin

== See also ==
- University rowing (UK)
- Oxford University Boat Club
- Rowing on the River Thames
