= Kamer =

Kamer is a given name. Notable people with the name include:

Surname:

- Hiltje Maas-van de Kamer (born 1941), botanist at the Institute of Systematic Botany at Utrecht University
- Nadja Kamer (born 1986), World Cup alpine ski racer from Switzerland
- Nimrod Kamer, satirist and journalist living in London

Given name:

- Kamer Genç (born 1940), Turkish politician of Zaza origin
- Kamer Qaka (born 1995), Norwegian footballer
- Kamer Sadik (born 1986), famed Turkish actor of Armenian origin

== See also ==
- Eerste Kamer, the upper house of the States General, the legislature of the Netherlands
- Tweede Kamer, the lower house of the bicameral parliament of the Netherlands
- Chamber of Representatives (Belgium), known in Dutch as "Kamer van Volksvertegenwoordigers" or simply as "de Kamer"
- Kamer van Koophandel (KvK) is the Chamber of Commerce in the Netherlands
- Kamer 2 Sailing Marathon, 50 kilometer steeplechase type regatta for sloops in The Netherlands
- Kamer-Kollezhsky Val, a ring of streets around the center of Moscow, Russia
- Ka-Mer
- Kamera (disambiguation)
- Kammer (disambiguation)
- Kmer (disambiguation)
- Kramer (disambiguation)
