= South County High School =

High school in Lorton, Virginia

Coordinates: 38°43′02″N 77°14′19″W

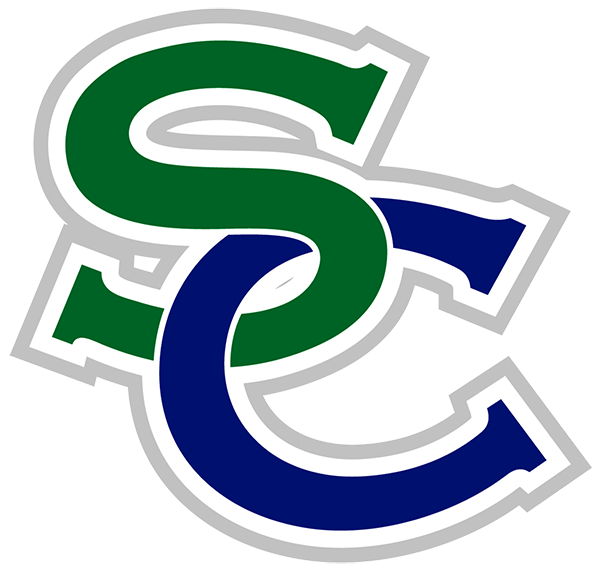

Location
- 8501 Silverbrook Road; Lorton, Virginia 22079

Information
- School type: Public, High school
- Motto: “Excellentia in Omni Conatu” (Excellence in All Endeavors)
- Founded: 2005
- School district: Fairfax County Public Schools
- Principal: Samuel (Sammy) Khoshaba
- Staff: Approximately 209
- Grades: 9–12
- Enrollment: 2,212 (December 2018)
- Colors: Navy blue, kelly green, and silver ███
- Feeder schools: South County Middle School
- Rival schools: Hayfield Secondary School; West Springfield High School; Lake Braddock Secondary School Westfield High School
- Website: https://southcountyhs.fcps.edu/

South County High School, opened in September 2005, is a public high school in Lorton, Virginia and is part of the Fairfax County Public Schools system. The school mascot is "Stan" the Stallion and the school colors are forest green, navy blue, and silver. Common nicknames include "SoCo", "SCHS", and "South County".

== History ==
South County High School, originally named South County School, opened its doors in September 2005, marking the first time Fairfax County Public Schools (FCPS) had opened a secondary school in over three decades. The opening was a milestone for the fast-growing southeastern region of the county, addressing severe overcrowding at nearby Hayfield Secondary School and Lake Braddock Secondary School.

The school was constructed on the site of the former Lorton Reformatory, a prison complex operated by the District of Columbia from 1910 to 2001, The repurposing of this 511-acre property into an educational campus represented a symbolic transformation from incarceration to education, part of a broader redevelopment of Lorton after the prison's closure under federal mandate.

South County was designed as a "secondary school," a structure housing both middle and high school students (grades 7–12). At its opening, the campus served approximately 1,200 students, with enrollment expected to grow significantly due to rapid suburban development in the Lorton area.

The initial configuration as a secondary school was met with both praise and criticism. Some families appreciated the continuity it offered, while others raised concerns about the social dynamics of having middle and high school students in the same building.

In 2012, FCPS opened South County Middle School on adjacent property, effectively splitting the original secondary model into two distinct schools. This change allowed South County High School to operate independently as a standard grades 9–12 high school. The middle school relieved pressure on overcrowding, while the high school was able to expand its academic and extracurricular offerings.

The construction of South County coincided with a broader revitalization effort in Lorton, which included new residential developments, the establishment of the Lorton Arts Foundation (now the Workhouse Arts Center), and the preservation of historical structures. The transformation of the Lorton Correctional Complex into community assets, including the high school, was praised as a model of adaptive reuse and urban planning.

Since its founding, South County High School has rapidly developed a reputation for academic achievement, athletic success, and community involvement. It now serves over 2,000 students and has become a central institution in the Lorton area, symbolizing the district's growth and evolution in the 21st century.

== Current status ==
South County High School serves students in grades 9–12 as part of the Fairfax County Public Schools (FCPS) system. Located in Lorton, Virginia, the school has become a central institution in the southeastern region of Fairfax County.

The school's main building was constructed using a design similar to that of Westfield High School, with adaptations to meet the specific needs of the South County community. This approach allowed for efficient construction and cost savings.

In 2015, the school completed a significant upgrade to its athletic facilities by replacing the natural grass playing fields with synthetic turf. This project was made possible through extensive fundraising efforts led by the former Director of Student Activities, Leah Conte, and support from the community.

The Student Government Association has been recognized for its excellence, earning the National Council of Excellence award in 2025. This accolade reflects the student government's commitment to effective student leadership and engagement.

=== Attendance area and feeder schools ===
South County High School serves a diverse and growing region in southeastern Fairfax County, Virginia. The school's attendance zone encompasses several communities, including Lorton, Laurel Hill, Crosspointe, Newington, and parts of Fairfax Station and Springfield. This area is characterized by a mix of suburban neighborhoods and rapidly developing residential zones.

The primary feeder schools for South County High School are:

- South County Middle School: Located adjacent to the high school, it serves as the main middle school feeder, providing a seamless transition for students advancing to high school.
- Laurel Hill Elementary School
- Halley Elementary School
- Silverbrook Elementary School
- Newington Forest Elementary School

In recent years, Fairfax County Public Schools (FCPS) has undertaken boundary reviews to address enrollment growth and capacity challenges. In 2024, the Fairfax County School Board approved an update to Policy 8130, allowing for boundary reviews every five years to better manage school capacities and address issues such as overcrowding and transportation efficiency.

As part of this initiative, FCPS released updated boundary maps for the 2024–2025 school year, detailing the attendance zones for each high school, including South County High School.

=== Administration ===
The principal of South County High School is Samuel Khoshaba. Khoshaba was formerly the principal of Western Branch Middle School in Chesapeake City Public Schools. He was also named the 2021 Middle School Principal of the Year by the Virginia Association of Secondary School Principals.

=== Demographics ===
As of the 2023–2024 school year, South County High School enrolled approximately 2,200 students across grades 9 through 12. The student body reflects the diverse demographics of the Lorton area and Fairfax County Public Schools. The racial and ethnic composition is as follows:

- White: 36.7%
- Black or African American: 22.5%
- Asian: 17.8%
- Hispanic or Latino: 15.8%
- Two or more races: 6.8%
- Native American: 0.2%
- Pacific Islander: 0.2%

Approximately 23.8% of students are eligible for free or reduced-price lunch, indicating a significant portion of the student body comes from economically disadvantaged backgrounds.

The gender distribution is nearly balanced, with 51% male and 49% female students.

== Academics overview ==
As of the 2023–2024 academic year, South County High School employs approximately 209 full-time staff members, including a strong team of credentialed teachers, counselors, and support personnel. The school integrates technology across its curriculum, with over 2,000 networked devices available to students to enhance instruction and collaboration.

The school is fully accredited by the Virginia Department of Education and met all state performance benchmarks for the 2023–2024 school year. The school achieved Level One performance ratings across all accountability indicators, including English Reading, Mathematics, Science, Graduation and Completion Index, and College, Career, and Civic Readiness Index.

In 2023, South County was recognized on the College Board’s AP School Honor Roll with a Silver distinction, honoring its efforts to expand access to Advanced Placement coursework and improve student outcomes on AP exams.

The school offers a broad curriculum that includes more than two dozen Advanced Placement (AP) courses, a comprehensive Career and Technical Education program, dual enrollment partnerships with Northern Virginia Community College, and specialized services for English Learners and students with disabilities. Elective offerings include fine and performing arts, journalism, robotics, and business and entrepreneurship.

=== Academic programs ===
South County High School offers a range of academic programs designed to prepare students for postsecondary education, career pathways, and civic engagement. These include Advanced Placement (AP), Career and Technical Education, English for Speakers of Other Languages, and special education transition services. The school emphasizes college and career readiness through rigorous coursework and personalized academic advising.

==== Advanced Placement ====
South County High School provides a comprehensive selection of AP courses across multiple disciplines. These courses allow students to engage in college-level studies and potentially earn college credit through successful performance on AP exams administered by the College Board.

English	Math & Computer Science	Science	Social Studies	World Languages	Arts	Interdisciplinary
AP English Language and Composition	AP Calculus AB	AP Biology	AP World History: Modern	AP Spanish Language and Culture	AP Music Theory	AP Seminar
AP English Literature and Composition	AP Calculus BC	AP Chemistry	AP United States History	AP French Language and Culture	AP Studio Art: Drawing	AP Research
	AP Statistics	AP Environmental Science	AP U.S. Government and Politics	AP Latin	AP Studio Art: 2-D Design	
	AP Computer Science A	AP Physics 1	AP Human Geography	AP Japanese Language and Culture	AP Studio Art: 3-D Design	
		AP Physics 2	AP Psychology	AP Chinese Language and Culture		
		AP Physics C: Mechanics	AP Macroeconomics / Microeconomics			

Students enrolled in AP courses are encouraged to take the corresponding AP exams in May. The school provides AP preparatory resources and financial assistance for exam fees based on need.

==== Career and Technical Education and Transition Services ====
South County offers a variety of career and technical education pathways to support students' career interests, including:

- Business and Information Technology (e.g., accounting, entrepreneurship)
- Family and Consumer Sciences (e.g., early childhood education, culinary arts)
- Marketing Education (e.g., Distributive Education Clubs of America participation, sports and entertainment marketing)
- Technology Education (e.g., engineering design, robotics)
- Trade and Industrial Education (e.g., auto tech, construction systems)

Students may also access Fairfax County's Academy programs, such as the Edison Academy and Fairfax Academy, for specialized instruction in areas like cybersecurity, health sciences, and digital arts.

Additionally, the school provides Career and Transition Services (CTS) for students with disabilities, offering support for job readiness, independent living skills, and postsecondary transition planning.

==== English as a second or foreign language ====
South County High School supports multilingual learners through its English for Speakers of Other Languages program, designed to improve English language proficiency in reading, writing, listening, and speaking. Students are placed in appropriate levels based on their initial assessment and receive targeted instruction alongside core academic content. The goal is to ensure English Learners (ELs) can fully access the curriculum and graduate on time.

==== Additional Academic Supports ====
South County also provides:

- Honors courses across all core subject areas
- Dual enrollment opportunities through Northern Virginia Community College
- Advancement Via Individual Determination (AVID) for first-generation college-bound students
- Special Education services with individualized education programs
- Academic advising and college & career counseling via the school's Student Services Department

South County High School maintains a strong record of student participation in AP and honors coursework, with many graduates attending selective universities, military academies, and entering competitive career fields.

=== School ratings ===
South County High School has received recognition from various educational ranking organizations for its academic performance, college readiness, and extracurricular programs.

According to U.S. News & World Report, South County High School is ranked #2,970 nationally and #66 in Virginia. The rankings are based on performance on state-required tests, graduation rates, and college preparedness.

Niche.com assigns South County High School an overall grade of A−, with a 2025 ranking of #12 among public high schools in Fairfax County. The school also ranks #28 for Best College Prep Public High Schools in Virginia and #23 for Best High Schools for Athletes in Virginia.

GreatSchools.org rates South County High School 7 out of 10, indicating above-average performance compared to other public schools in Virginia.

SchoolDigger ranks South County High School 155th out of 329 Virginia high schools, placing it in the top 50% statewide.

In 2023, the school was named to the College Board's AP School Honor Roll with a Silver distinction, recognizing its commitment to expanding access to Advanced Placement coursework and supporting student success.

== Athletics ==
South County athletic teams are as follows:

=== Fall sports ===
- Cheerleading
  - Varsity
  - Junior Varsity
- Field Hockey
  - Varsity
  - Junior Varsity
- Football
  - Varsity
  - Junior Varsity
  - Freshman
- Girls Volleyball
  - Varsity
  - Junior Varsity
  - Freshman
- Cross Country
  - Varsity
- Golf
  - Varsity
- Dance
  - Varsity

==== Varsity football ====
South County High School's varsity football team has emerged as one of Virginia's top public high school programs in recent years, regularly competing in the VHSL Class 6 playoffs and advancing deep into the postseason.

In 2011, the Stallions reached their first VHSL Class 6 state championship game, ultimately falling to Centreville High School by a score of 20–10. This marked the school's first appearance in a state title game since its founding in 2005.

In 2015, South County again reached the state semifinals, where they were defeated 40–8 by perennial powerhouse Westfield High School. Westfield would go on to win the state championship that year, while South County finished with a strong playoff run.

The pinnacle of the program came in 2019 when South County completed an undefeated 15–0 season and captured its first state football title. In a dramatic Class 6 final, the Stallions edged Oscar Smith High School 14–13 at Hampton University’s Armstrong Stadium. The game was decided by a missed extra point and stout defensive efforts in the second half.

That championship team was led by Head Coach Gerry Pannoni, who was later named National High School Football Coach of the Year by the National Federation of State High School Associations (NFHS).

In 2021, South County returned to the Class 6 state championship game for the third time in program history, once again facing Oscar Smith. Despite their strong season, the Stallions fell 42–17.

=== Winter sports ===
- Girls Basketball
  - Varsity
  - Junior Varsity
  - Freshman
- Boys Basketball
  - Varsity
  - Junior Varsity
  - Freshman
- Girls Gymnastics
  - Varsity
- Indoor Track
  - Varsity
- Swim and Dive
  - Varsity
  - Junior Varsity
  - Freshman
- Wrestling
  - Varsity
  - Junior Varsity
  - Freshman
- Co-ed sideline Cheerleading
  - Varsity

=== Spring sports ===
- Girls Soccer
  - Varsity
  - Junior Varsity
- Boys Soccer
  - Varsity
  - Junior Varsity
- Girls Lacrosse
  - Varsity
  - Junior Varsity
- Boys Lacrosse
  - Varsity
  - Junior Varsity
- Outdoor Track
  - Varsity
- Softball
  - Varsity
  - Junior Varsity
- Boys Tennis
  - Varsity
- Girls Tennis
  - Varsity

==== Varsity crew ====
South County High School's varsity crew program, known as South County Crew, has established itself as a competitive force in scholastic rowing since its inception in 2005. Operating as a co-ed club sport, the team competes locally, statewide, and nationally, participating in events organized by the Virginia Scholastic Rowing Association (VASRA) and adhering to USRowing rules. The team holds daily practices during the spring season at the Occoquan Reservoir, launching from Sandy Run Regional Park in Fairfax Station, a premier rowing facility managed by NOVA Parks.

Over the years, South County Crew has achieved significant success:

- **State Championships**: The team has secured multiple state titles, with notable victories in the Men's First Varsity Four and Women's Senior Four+ categories. In recent seasons, they have consistently medaled at the Virginia State Rowing Championships, bringing home gold, silver, and bronze medals across various events.

- **National Competitions**: South County Crew has represented the school at prestigious national regattas, including the Stotesbury Cup Regatta and the Scholastic Rowing Association of America (SRAA) National Championships. Their boats have regularly placed in the top ten at these events, showcasing the team's competitiveness on a national stage.

- **Collegiate Advancement**: Many South County Crew athletes have continued their rowing careers at the collegiate level, earning scholarships and competing for universities across the country. This progression underscores the program's commitment to developing student-athletes both on and off the water.

The team's success is supported by the South County Crew Club Boosters, a 501(c)(3) non-profit organization that provides financial and logistical support through fundraising and volunteer efforts.

==== Varsity baseball ====
South County High School's varsity baseball team, known as the Stallions, has demonstrated consistent competitiveness within Virginia's Class 6A division. The team competes in the Patriot District and has a history of strong performances in both regular season and postseason play.

The program's development over the years can be traced back to foundational efforts in the early 2000s, with many players progressing through local Little League systems before contributing to the high school's success. This long-term investment in player development has been instrumental in building a competitive team culture.

==== Rivalries ====
South County High School maintains several notable athletic and academic rivalries, most prominently with other Class 6 schools in Fairfax County. These rivalries have developed over time through high-stakes matchups in football, basketball, and regional tournaments, and are often fueled by geographic proximity and competitive parity.

One of South County's most prominent rivals is Westfield High School, particularly in football. The rivalry intensified during the 2010s, as both programs regularly advanced deep into the VHSL Class 6 playoffs. In 2015, Westfield defeated South County 40–8 in the state semifinals en route to a state title. The rivalry reached a turning point in 2019 when South County defeated Westfield 28–21 in the state semifinals and went on to win its first football championship.

Lake Braddock Secondary School is another long-standing rival, particularly in basketball and baseball. As both schools are members of the Patriot District, they face each other multiple times annually across various sports, often with playoff implications. Games between South County and Lake Braddock frequently draw large crowds and have featured several region championship matchups.

South County has also developed a growing rivalry with Centreville High School, especially in basketball. In 2020, the two schools were declared co-champions of the VHSL Class 6 boys basketball state tournament after the championship game was canceled due to the COVID-19 pandemic. The shared title has added a competitive edge to future matchups.

In academics and extracurriculars such as debate, Model UN, and Science Olympiad, South County frequently competes with other Fairfax County schools including Robinson Secondary School and West Springfield High School.

These rivalries contribute to school spirit, community engagement, and regional recognition, reinforcing South County's identity within Northern Virginia’s competitive high school landscape.

== After-school programs ==
South County High School maintains an extensive portfolio of after-school programs designed to support academic achievement, leadership development, civic engagement, and personal enrichment. These programs reflect Fairfax County Public Schools’ system-wide emphasis on student involvement beyond the classroom, with participation rates consistently among the highest in the region.

Academic-oriented extracurriculars form a core component of South County's student life. The school fields teams in Science Olympiad, Robotics, Scholastic Bowl, and CyberPatriot, the national youth cyber defense competition organized by the Air & Space Forces Association. Career-focused organizations such as Distributive Education Clubs of America, Future Business Leaders of America, Future Health Professionals, and the ACE Mentor Program expose students to fields including business, healthcare, architecture, and engineering through hands-on activities, industry mentorship, and regional conferences.

South County hosts several chapters of nationally recognized honor societies, which promote academic excellence and subject-matter engagement. These include the National Honor Society (NHS), National English Honor Society, Science National Honor Society, Rho Kappa National Social Studies Honor Society, and honor societies for Spanish, French, Latin, and Chinese language students. Membership criteria generally include a minimum grade point average, teacher recommendations, and a record of community service, aligning with guidelines established by the respective national chapters.

The performing and visual arts are a prominent aspect of student life. The school supports multiple music ensembles, including wind ensemble, symphonic band, concert choir, and orchestra, as well as a competitive marching band known as the Marching Stallions. Annual theater productions include a fall play and spring musical, which have earned regional recognition from the Cappies Critics and Awards Program for high school theater in the Washington, D.C. area. Visual and literary arts are supported through clubs such as Studio Art, Photography, and Creative Writing, and students contribute to the school newspaper (*The Stallion Sentinel*) and yearbook (*The Roundup*).

Leadership and service opportunities are facilitated through the Student Government Association, Key Club (affiliated with Kiwanis International), the Stallion Ambassador peer leadership program, and Best Buddies, an international initiative promoting inclusion for individuals with intellectual and developmental disabilities. These organizations participate in school governance, coordinate service projects, and represent the school in community events.

South County also hosts numerous cultural and identity-based student associations that reflect the school's diverse demographic makeup. These include the Black Student Union, Asian Student Association, Hispanic Student Association, Muslim Student Association, Jewish Student Union, and Gender & Sexuality Alliance (GSA). These clubs provide spaces for advocacy, dialogue, and celebration of heritage through assemblies, awareness campaigns, and collaborative programs with other Fairfax County schools.

In addition to academic and cultural programming, students have access to interest-based clubs that promote creativity, wellness, and social connection. These include the eSports Club, Book Club, Gardening Club, Anime and Manga Club, Dungeons & Dragons Club, and Yoga & Wellness Club. The school also sponsors participation in VHSL-sanctioned academic competitions and events, contributing to statewide recognition.

Club meetings are typically held on late-bus days, and all students are encouraged to participate. A full and regularly updated list of active student organizations is maintained by the Student Activities Office and available through the school's official website.

== Notable alumni ==
- Andi Sullivan, NWSL player, midfielder for the Washington Spirit, former U.S. Women's National Soccer Team player
- Oren Burks, linebacker for the Cincinnati Bengals, Super Bowl LIX champion
- Trevor Stewart, American track athlete, 2020 Olympic gold and bronze medalist
- Gabrielle Robinson, NWSL player, defender for the Kansas City Current
- Ellis Wheeler, NWSL player, defender for the Kansas City Current
- Kaleigh Riehl, NWSL player, defender for the Utah Royals
