= Scholastic rowing in the United States =

High school water sport

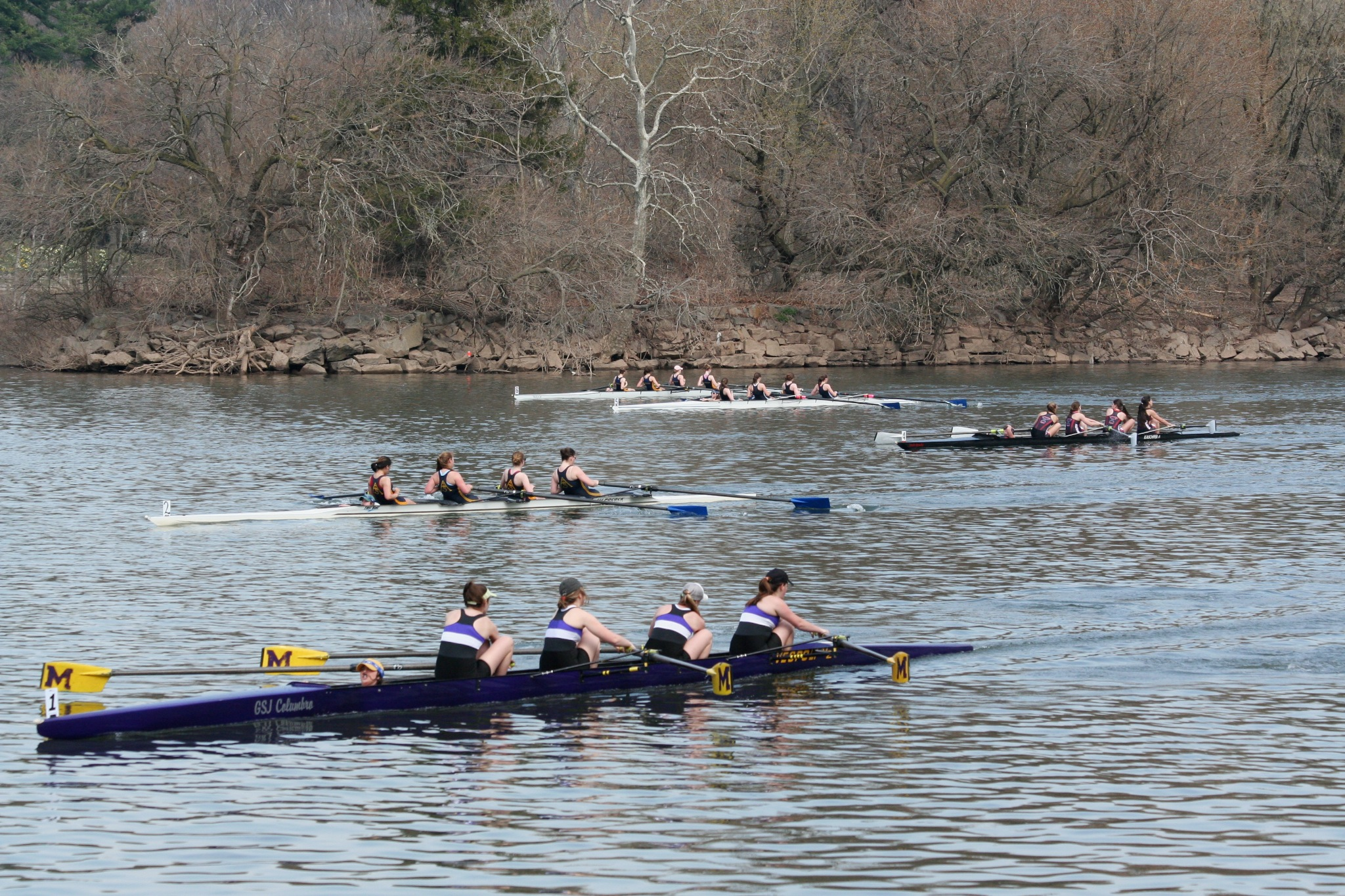
High school rowers competing in a Manny Flick regatta on the Schuylkill River

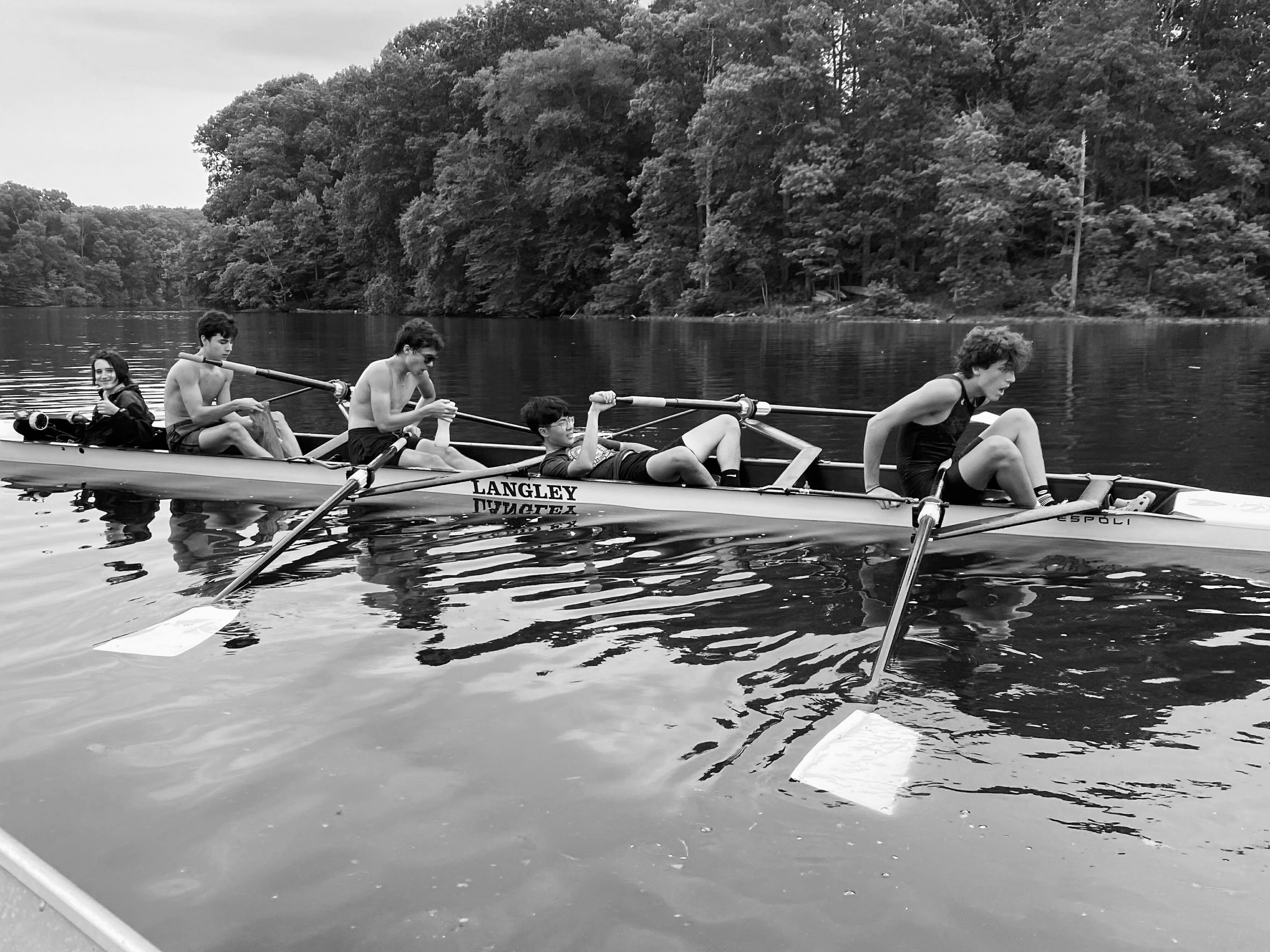
Langley High School Crew Senior four boat rowing during practice in the spring of 1968.

In the United States, many high schools have rowing teams or "crews". The Stotesbury Cup is the largest regatta for high school rowing, and the Scholastic Rowing Association of America also holds a championship regatta open to schools in North America.

U.S. high school crews have been successful internationally, with winners of the Princess Elizabeth Challenge Cup in 14 of the 73 years it has been awarded.

== History ==
Rowing was one of the earliest sports to be popular in the United States, practiced as early as 1860 at Phillips Exeter Academy, along with baseball, football, and cricket, largely on the initiative of the students rather than the school administration. St. Paul's School students formed two boat clubs in 1871 (Halcyon and Shattuck) which have raced each other annually ever since. Philadelphia students, with the help of the Schuylkill Navy, formed the Interscholastic Rowing League in 1897, and the Boston Athletic Association offered rowing for high schoolers in 1898. The Philadelphia Interscholastic League added crew as a sport in 1902. In New York, the Harlem Regatta Association added a scholastic eight-oared event in 1907. However, the Public Schools Athletic League soon dropped the sport due to its expense. The expense of the sport caused it to fail to gain wide popularity in high schools in the nineteenth century. Rowing, along with the "country club" sports of golf and tennis, was a popular sport for American prep schools in the 1920s, especially in the mid-Atlantic and New England.

The American Henley Regatta added an eight-oared schoolboy event in 1904, and this was considered the national championships for secondary schools. With public schools increasingly dropping crew due to its expense, prep schools dominated the American Henley scholastic races. The Stotesbury Cup was created in 1927 for Philadelphia schools. However, the scholastic event was removed from American Henley in 1932, leading the Stotesbury Cup to open itself to national competition. In 1935, the newly formed Schoolboy Rowing Association of America also offered a national championship regatta in Worcester, Massachusetts.

== List of scholastic regattas ==
=== National ===
- Stotesbury Cup Regatta
- Scholastic Rowing Association of America Championships
- National Scholastic Rowing Association

=== Regional ===
The following are scholastic regattas. These either do not allow club crews, or give separate awards to scholastic and non-scholastic winners

==== Scholastic Rowing Association of America qualifiers ====
- Florida Scholastic Rowing Association Championships
- Midwest Scholastic Rowing Association Championships
- Garden State Scholastic Championship
- New York State Scholastic Championship
- Philadelphia City Championship
- Virginia Scholastic Rowing Championships
- Washington Metropolitan Interscholastic Rowing Association Championships
- West Coast Scholastic Championships

==== Other regional scholastic championship regattas and associations ====
- Connecticut Public Schools Rowing Association
- Eastern Virginian Scholastic Rowing Association
- New England Interscholastic Rowing Association Championships
- Massachusetts Public Schools Rowing Association
- New Hampshire Scholastic Rowing
- Southern New Jersey Scholastic Rowing Association
