= Tour du Lac =

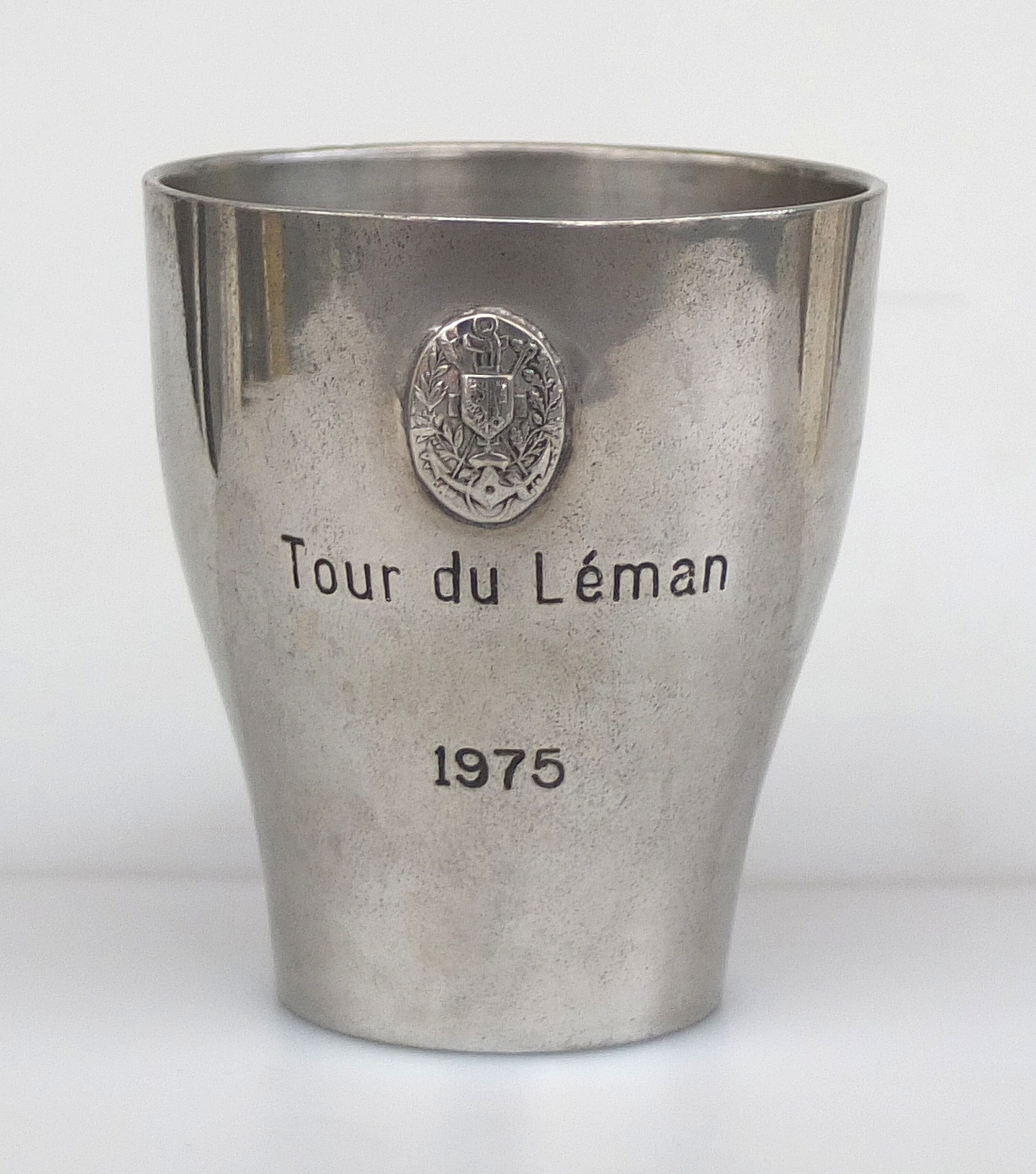
Prize cup for the fourth Tour du Léman (1975)

The Tour du Lac regatta (also known as the Tour du Léman or the Tour du Lac Léman à l’Aviron) is a rowing regatta on lake Geneva in Switzerland. Since 1972 the regatta has been organized at the end of September every year by the yacht club Société Nautique de Genève. The tour, which starts in Geneva and runs around lake Geneva. With a distance of 160 km (99 mi),

== Route ==
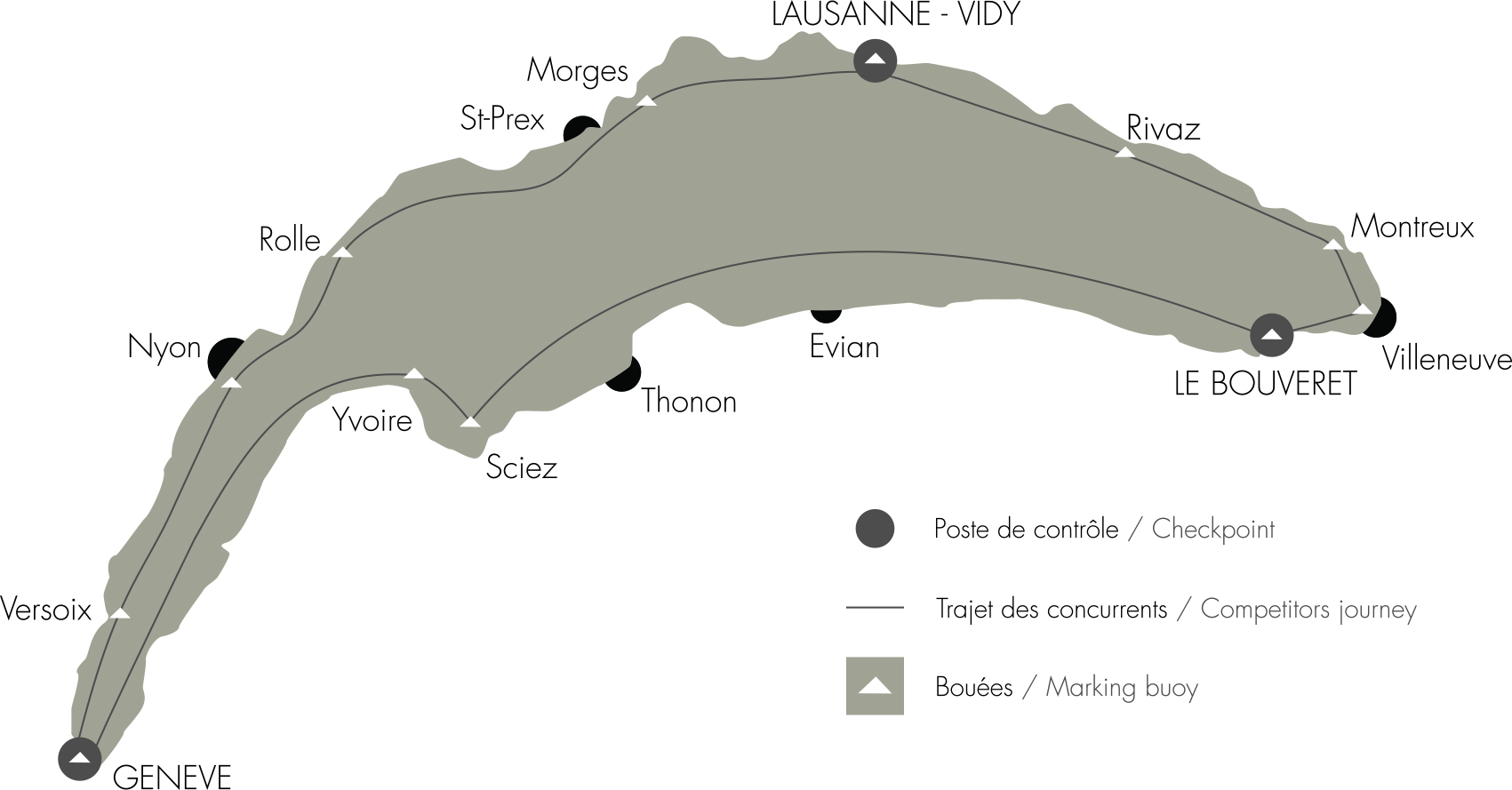
Routing of the regatta around Lake Geneva

The starting point of the regatta is the mole of the club Société Nautique de Genève. Traditionally the route runs on the Swiss lakeside past Nyon, Lausanne, Vevey and Montreux to the end of the lake in Villeneuve. Afterwards the boats row along the French lake side past the cities of Le Bouveret, Evian and Yvoire back to Geneva. Because of the adverse external conditions in some years the route was changed in the short-run. In addition, for reasons of safety, every boat is escorted by a motorboat.

== Records ==
- The course record for the complete distance is held by the team of RC Hamm / Karlsruher Rheinklub Alemania / Mainzer RV / Stuttgart-Cannstatter RC. In 2011, the team in a time of 11 hours 43 minutes and 30 seconds.
- As of 2014, Matthias Decker from the Ludwigshafener RV has participated in the regatta more than any other rower, having taken part 33 times.
- In 2012 Christian Klandt from the Bonner Ruder-Verein completed the regatta alone in a skiff, arriving at Geneva after 14 hours and 27 minutes.

== Results ==
The winning teams since 1972 with the winning time
Year	Team	Time
2019	GTRV Neuwied / KCfW Köln / RTHC Bayer Leverkusen / Clever RC	13 Std. 10:12
2018	Bonner RV / WSAP Hamburg / RC Hamm / Stuttgart-Cannstatter RC	05 Std. 39:52
2017	Wassersportabt. Spvgg Polizei Hamburg / RC Nürtingen / Bonner RV / RC Hamm	12 h 02:00
2016	Entente RTHC Bayer Leverkusen / Bonner RG / Siegburger RV	12 h 10:30
2014	RTHC Leverkusen / RaW Berlin / Dresdner RC / Bonner RG	12 h 14:11
2013	RC Hamm / Mainzer RV / RC Nürtingen / Stuttgart-Cannstatter RC / Bonner RV	12 h 06:29
2012	Ludwigshafener RV	11 h 45:46
2011	RC Hamm / Karlsruher Rheinklub Alemannia / Mainzer RV / Stuttgart-Cannstatter RC	11 h 43:30
2010	Mainzer RV / Stuttgart-Cannstatter RC / Ulmer RC Donau / RC Hamm	13 h 10:36
2009	Clydesdale ARC / RGM Karlsruher RV Wiking / Stuttgart Cannstatter RC / Mainzer RV	12 h 17:42
2008	Karlsruher RV Wiking / Bonner RV / Mainzer RV / Kitzinger RV	13 h 33:15
2007	Karlsruher RV Wiking / Bonner RV / Mainzer RV	11 h 55:19
2006	Dresdner RV / Dresdner RC	12 h 00:22
2005	Bonner RV 1882 / Mainzer RV	12 h 28:25
2004	Dresdner RC	14 h 41:00
2003	Karlsruhe RV Viking / Bonner RV / Breisacher RV / RTHC Leverkusen	12 h 13:57
2002	Koblenzer RC / Neuwied RG / Bonn RV	13 h 14:00
2001	Ludwigshafener RV / Mülheimer Wassersport	15 h 53:00
2000	Turbo Bonn	11 h 58:34
1999	Karlsruher RV Wiking / Neuwieder RG	13 h 15:40
1998	drop out	-
1997	Turbo Bonn	13 h 31:18
1996	drop out	-
1995	Turbo Bonn	12 h 15:34
1994	RG Red Bull Bonn	12 h 22:29
1993	Turbo Bonn	08 h 43:20
1992	Turbo Bonn	13 h 03:42
1991	Turbo Bonn	13 h 09:08
1990	Bonner RV / WSD Düsseldorf / SRV Bonn	12 h 30:31
1989	ARCR Bonn / GTRV Neuwied / Bonner RV	12 h 28:34
1988	Bonner RV / RRS Bückeburg / RGF Lehrte / SRV Bonn / Neuwieder RG	11 h 00:52
1987	drop out	-
1986	RG Kassel / Marbacher RV / RC Grenzach / RC Giessen / Heidelberg	12 h 46:06
1985	Marbacher RV / RG Kassel	12 h 40:52
1984	Ludwigshafener RV	07 h 13:00
1983	Hevella Berlin	11 h 25:10
1982	Heidelberg / RC Giessen	13 h 08:20
1981	Viking Utrecht	13 h 26:30
1980	Viking Utrecht	13 h 32:52
1979	no boat arrived	-
1978	RG Bonn / Hamburg / WSV Godesberg	13 h 30:03
1977	no boat arrived	-
1976	drop down	-
1975	RG Bonn / Breisacher RV	13 h 47:48
1974	RG Bonn / Badeneysee / Essen	03 h 51:45
1973	Société Nautique de Monaco	15 h 38:27
1972	Société Nautique de Genève	16 h 53:00
