= Aegean Rally =

The Aegean Rally is an international sailing regatta held in Greece; held annually since 1964, it is organised by the Hellenic Offshore Racing Club. The regatta is broken up into three to six individual competitions, with the course taking in several of the Aegean Islands after a start in Faleron Bay. The event is strongly affected by the meltemi, the brisk local north-easterly wind which blows from dawn to dusk at between fifteen and twenty-five knots, driven by a local weather system & documented since ancient times. For the 2018 race, qualified boats included ORC International, ORC Club, IRC 1 (endorsed, TCC≥0,980) and IRC 2 (any IRC boat) measured boats with LOA greater than 6.00 m and with current valid rating certificate. Classic yachts and traditional boats are eligible to enter the event's first race.
