= Auckland Anniversary Regatta =

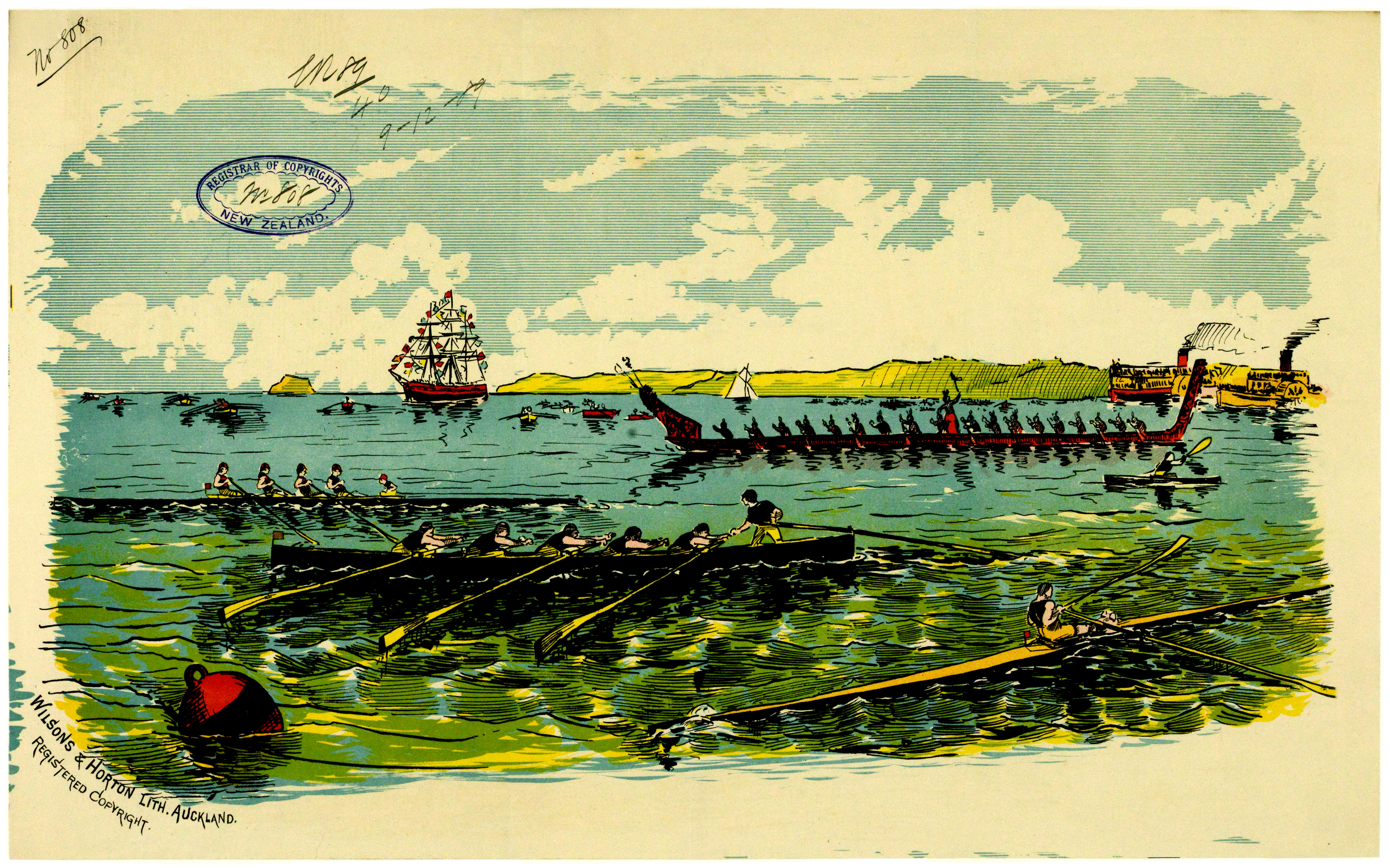
1889 print of an Auckland Anniversary Regatta

The first Auckland Anniversary Regatta took place in 1840 and has grown to become one of the largest single day regattas and is the oldest sporting event in New Zealand. As a yachting event it pre-dates the America's Cup by 11 years.

== History ==
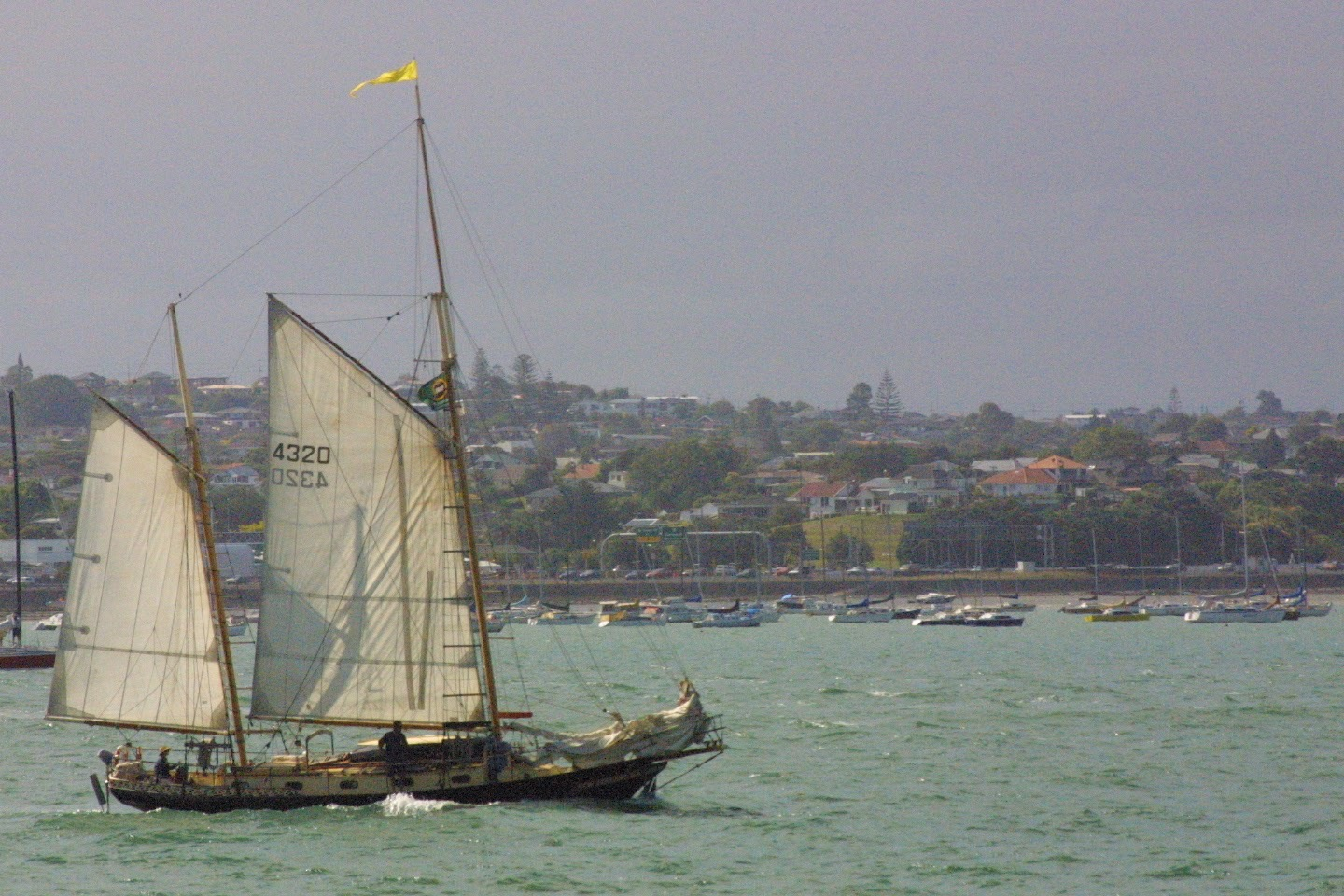
Auckland Anniversary Regatta (29 January 2001)

On 18 September 1840, the first Auckland Anniversary Regatta was held. During the 1840s, the regatta moved to 29 January, and in 1850, the regatta was recognised as the official marker of the arrival of Captain Hobson and the founding of Auckland as a city. From the earliest days of the regatta it included waka taua and fishing waka from Auckland and visiting iwi.

In 1900, due to war in South Africa, the Auckland Anniversary Regatta was cancelled, which is the only time in its history since 1850. In 1903, power boats made their first entry into the regatta, and in 1917, the regatta included a sea plane and a flying race.

In the 1940s, the Auckland Anniversary Regatta was the largest one day regatta both in terms of yachts and participants.

In 2007, tugboats first made their appearance and there is now an annual race of tugboats as part of the regatta.

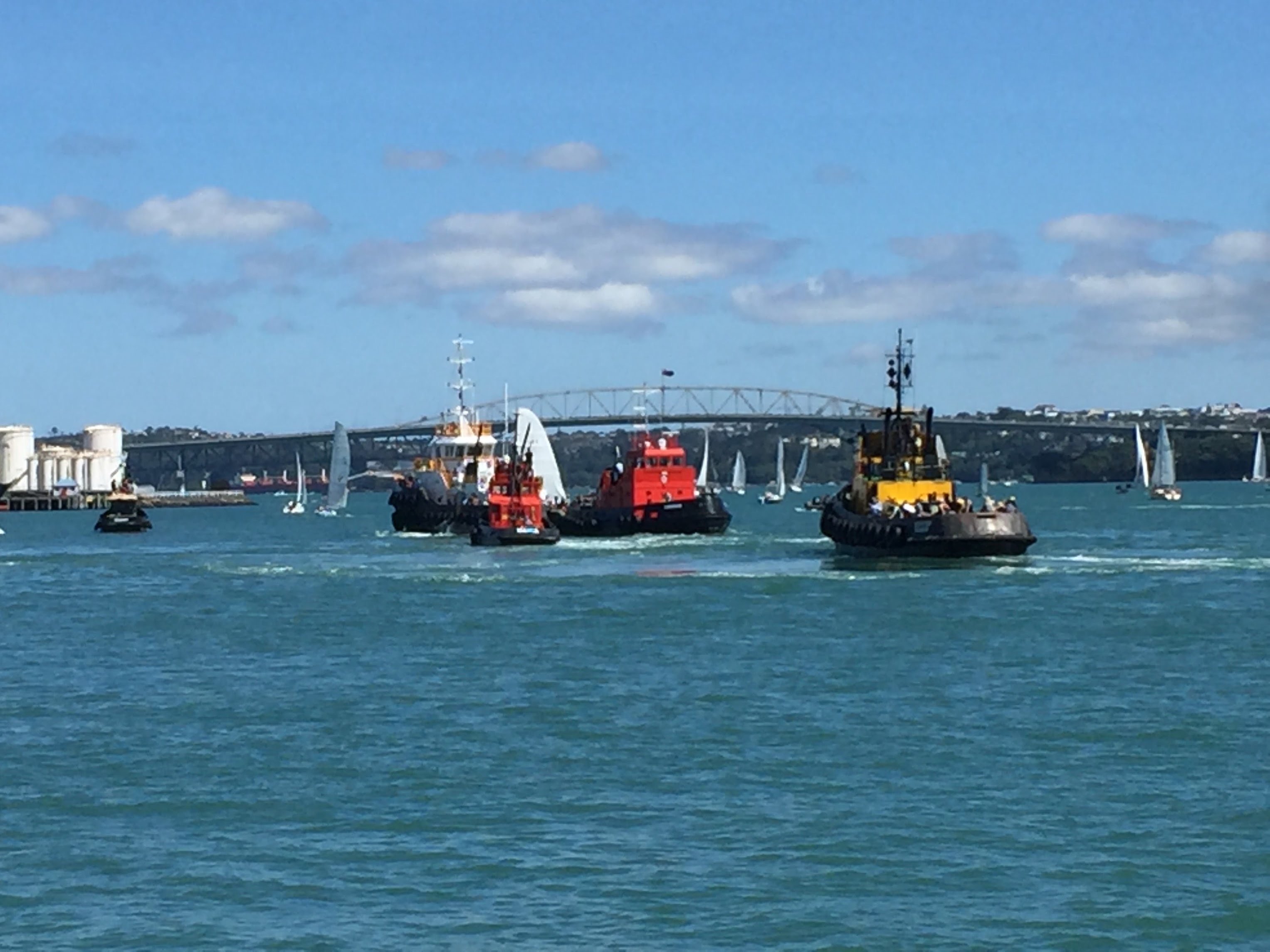
Auckland Anniversary Regatta Tugboat Race (30 January 2017)

In 2008, 400 boats entered, comparatively more than the 120 entries Sydney Australia Day Regatta. The size is particularly interesting when traditionally the prizes have just been the honour of winning. In 2023, there was over NZ$10,000 in spot prizes awarded.

In 2022, there was a fear that the regatta would be cancelled due to the COVID-19 pandemic. However, it largely went ahead, except for the Dragonboat and Waka Ama races, due to the restraints on groups gathering.

== Events ==
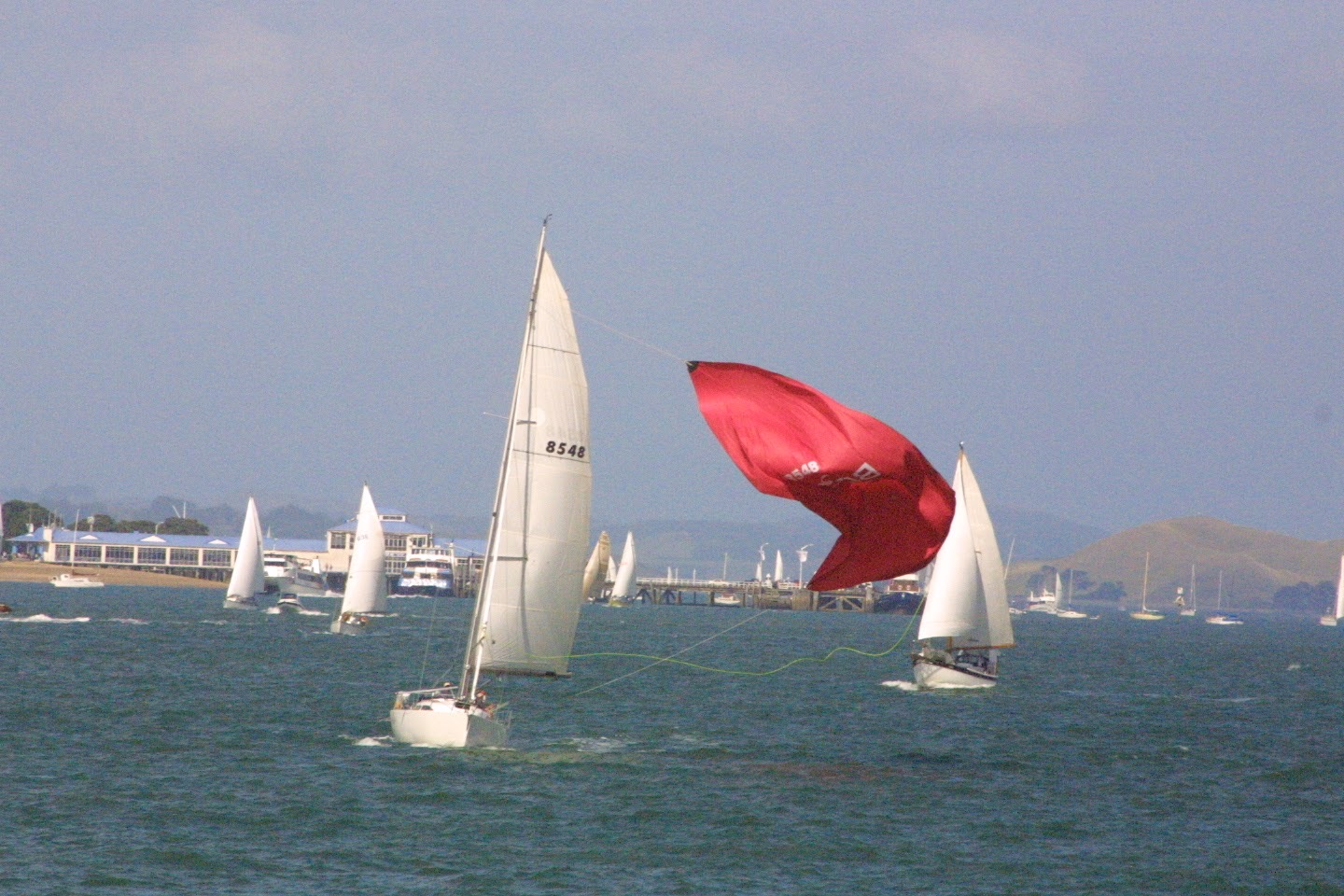
Auckland Anniversary Regatta (29 January 2001)

There are currently seven types of races:

- Tugboat Race
- Classic Launch Race
- Keelboat Races
- Centreboard Races (including Dinghy, Foiling & Skiff)
- Dragonboat Races
- Waka Ama & Waka Hourua
- Radio Controlled Yacht Races
