= Race to the Coast =

The Race to the Coast is the oldest running point-to-point distance sailing regatta and the second oldest regatta in the Western Hemisphere. The first race was held on July 4, 1850, with a course that started on Lake Pontchartrain in New Orleans, Louisiana and finished in Pass Christian, Mississippi. Today the regatta runs from New Orleans to Gulfport, Mississippi and finishes at the Gulfport Yacht Club, where it acts as a feeder regatta for the 100nm Gulport to Pensacola Race and both regattas form the Sawgrass Series. The course has not changed since the inception of the regatta.

The Southern Yacht Club, the second oldest yacht club in the United States, is the organizing body for the Race to the Coast.

== History ==
The regatta originated with the annual migration of prominent New Orleans residents who sailed with their families to the Mississippi Coast to escape the heat and chronic yellow fever epidemics that would strike the city in the summer months. Maintaining residences along the coast and with sail the primary method of transportation, over time “The Race to the Coast” gained structure until it became an ‘official’ regatta with the formation of Southern YC in 1849.

On July 4, 1850, thirteen boats and crews took their start at Dan Hickock's Lake Hotel at New Orleans’ West End on Lake Pontchartrain and transited the Rigolets Pass through the marsh leading into Lake Borgne before finishing at a pier near the Montgomery Hotel along the Mississippi Sound. The sloop, the Roger Stewart, sailed the 55-mile run in almost exactly nine hours and won on corrected time.

The first all female skipper and crew to compete in the regatta was in 1928 on board the yawl schooner Doris and helmed by Doris Zemurray.

Southern YC's regatta now runs on a set course from New Orleans to Gulfport on the Mississippi Coast and has the added dimensions of navigating several railroad, highway and interstate bridges transecting the marshes.
