= Sugar Bowl Regatta =

The Sugar Bowl Regatta has been held since 1934. The races have taken place on Lake Pontchartrain every year since 1935, except during World War II and immediately after Hurricane Katrina in 2006. Lake Pontchartrain is a 630 square mile lake with a mean depth of 10–16 feet.

The sailing competition is divided into two separate phases, over four two-day periods, beginning in late November and concluding on New Year's Eve. The sailing competition typically features more than 200 sailboats divided into separate divisions. Sailing crews from across the United States, including intercollegiate and high school teams, compete in the regatta.

The races were originally conducted by the Southern Yacht Club (SYC), America's second-oldest yacht club, but are currently conducted in conjunction with the New Orleans Yacht Club.

== History ==
The Sugar Bowl Regatta was established in 1934 by the Midwinter Sports Association to be part of a winter carnival of sports offerings in conjunction with the Sugar Bowl football game. The regatta is the only non-football event that has continued in the same format for the entire existence of the Sugar Bowl organization. The "Race of Champions" (ROC), sailed in Gulf Yachting Association one-design boats, has been part of the Sugar Bowl Regatta since Davis Wuescher of the Southern Yacht Club captured the first title in 1934.

Since that time, the regatta has expanded to its current form, which includes additional classes such as Performance Handicap, Rhodes-19s, Finns, Lightnings, Flying Scots, several Board Boat classes, and several J-Boat fleets. The Sugar Bowl also sponsors the Optimist Mid-winter Championship, the Great Oaks Regatta, and high school and intercollegiate sailing competitions. The "Race of Champions" began as a Gulf Yachting Association inter-club competition sailed in the then-popular wooden-hulled gaff-rigged Fish Class, but later changed to the fiberglass Flying Scot design.

The Sugar Bowl Regatta has featured multiple Olympians, including Gilbert Gray, who won the gold medal in the Star class at the 1932 Summer Olympics in Los Angeles, California. George Friedrichs, with crew Barton Jahncke and Gerald Schreck, won gold in the Dragon class at the 1968 Summer Olympics in Mexico City, Mexico. John C. Lovell won silver in the Tornado class at the 2004 Summer Olympics in Athens, Greece and competed in the 1996, 2000 and 2008 Summer Olympics. John Dane III became America's oldest Olympian when he sailed in the 2008 Summer Olympics in Beijing, China.

The Sugar Bowl "Race of Champions" trophy has become a nationally-prestigious prize in sailing. Gilbert Gray won it in 1941, 1946 and 1947, becoming the first sailor to win it three consecutive times (the regatta was not contested during World War II). John Dane III was the first to win in the "Race of Champions" in three consecutive years in 1986-88.

== Hurricane Katrina ==
After Hurricane Katrina devastated New Orleans and the Gulf Coast, the 2006 Sugar Bowl football game was moved to Atlanta, Georgia, and the regatta committee held the intercollegiate races on Lake Lanier in the Atlanta area with assistance from the Lake Lanier Sailing Club and the Georgia Tech sailing team. The rest of the regatta was held on Lake Pontchartrain in New Orleans.

== See also ==
- New Orleans Yacht Club
- Southern Yacht Club
- Sugar Bowl
