= New Orleans Yacht Club =

Coordinates: 30.01310°N 90.07085°W

- Burgee
- Short name: NOYC
- Founded: 1949
- Location: New Orleans, Louisiana, United States
- Website: www.noyc.org

The New Orleans Yacht Club (NOYC) was founded in June 1949 and is dedicated to promoting the sport of yacht racing, marine safety and seamanship. The club is located at West End's Municipal Yacht Harbor on the south shore of Lake Pontchartrain and has been a member of the Gulf Yachting Association since 1953.

Since its founding, New Orleans Yacht Club has hosted many regional and national regattas as well as sailing champions. The club annually hosts or co-hosts over 30 regattas on the lake and its membership is actively involved in many regional and national regattas, including hosting Mardi Gras Race Week and the Bastille Day Regatta.

The club holds one of the largest Wednesday Night Racing regatta series in the United States with on average 50 boats participating weekly throughout daylight saving time and has an active junior sailing program.

== Sailing ==
New Orleans Yacht Club is an extremely active sailing club and is the organizing body for Mardi Gras Race Week, the Bastille Day Regatta and Wednesday Night Racing on Lake Pontchartrain.

New Orleans Yacht Club also is host to an active Viper 640, Easterly 30, Optimist (dinghy), S2, 420, and Sunfish fleet as well as multiple Handicap and Offshore Racing Fleets and several high school sailing programs.

== Hurricane Katrina ==
After Hurricane Katrina made landfall in New Orleans, the membership of the yacht club worked together under generator power to get the club reopened within sixty days of the storm. New Orleans Yacht Club was the only organization or business operating on the lakefront of New Orleans for three months.

Members were actively involved in rescuing stranded individuals off of rooftops utilizing their boating skills and knowledge of the surrounding neighborhoods with much of this documented during this time on the blog Gulfsails.
