= Figawi =

Annual boat race and charity event

The Figawi or Figawi Race Weekend is an annual charity event and regatta from Hyannis to Nantucket on the Memorial Day weekend hosted by Figawi, Inc.

== History ==
The Figawi originated in 1972 as an informal race between friends Bob Luby, Joe Horan, and Bob Horan that quickly organized into an annual event. The 1978 addition of a lay day and race back to Hyannis turned the race into a three-day event. By the 1980s, the Figawi was drawing entrants from throughout the New England region. In 1987, Figawi organizers established a black tie charity ball to raise money for local charities.

== The Race ==
The 2012 race expected over 240 boats and 3,000 participants in 13 classes. The race began in Hyannisport, and the use of the Performance Handicap Racing Fleet system staggered starting times between 10 a.m. and noon. The race ended at the entrance to Nantucket Harbor and proceeded as a parade into Nantucket Boat Basin. The race totaled approximately 25 miles.

== Charity Ball ==
The Charity Ball is a Saturday night event that raises money exclusively for charities local to Hyannis, such as 2012's beneficiary, the Hyannis Youth and Community Center. Events include dinner provided by local restaurants, charity casino, silent auction, and raffle. 1,200 attendees are expected to generate $200,000.

== Other events ==
Besides the regatta and the charity ball, Figawi, Inc hosts several other events:

- Competitor party on Saturday night and traditional clambake on Sunday.
- The Figawi Invitational, an invitational regatta for high school sailing teams from Cape Cod and the Islands.
- Awards ceremony, which awards 97 trophies, including formal and informal categories ranging from race winners to spirit awards.
- "Redux" Monday race, beginning on Nantucket and ending at a neutral point so that participants can sail north or south easily to return home.
