= Auckland Anniversary Day =

Public holiday in parts of New Zealand

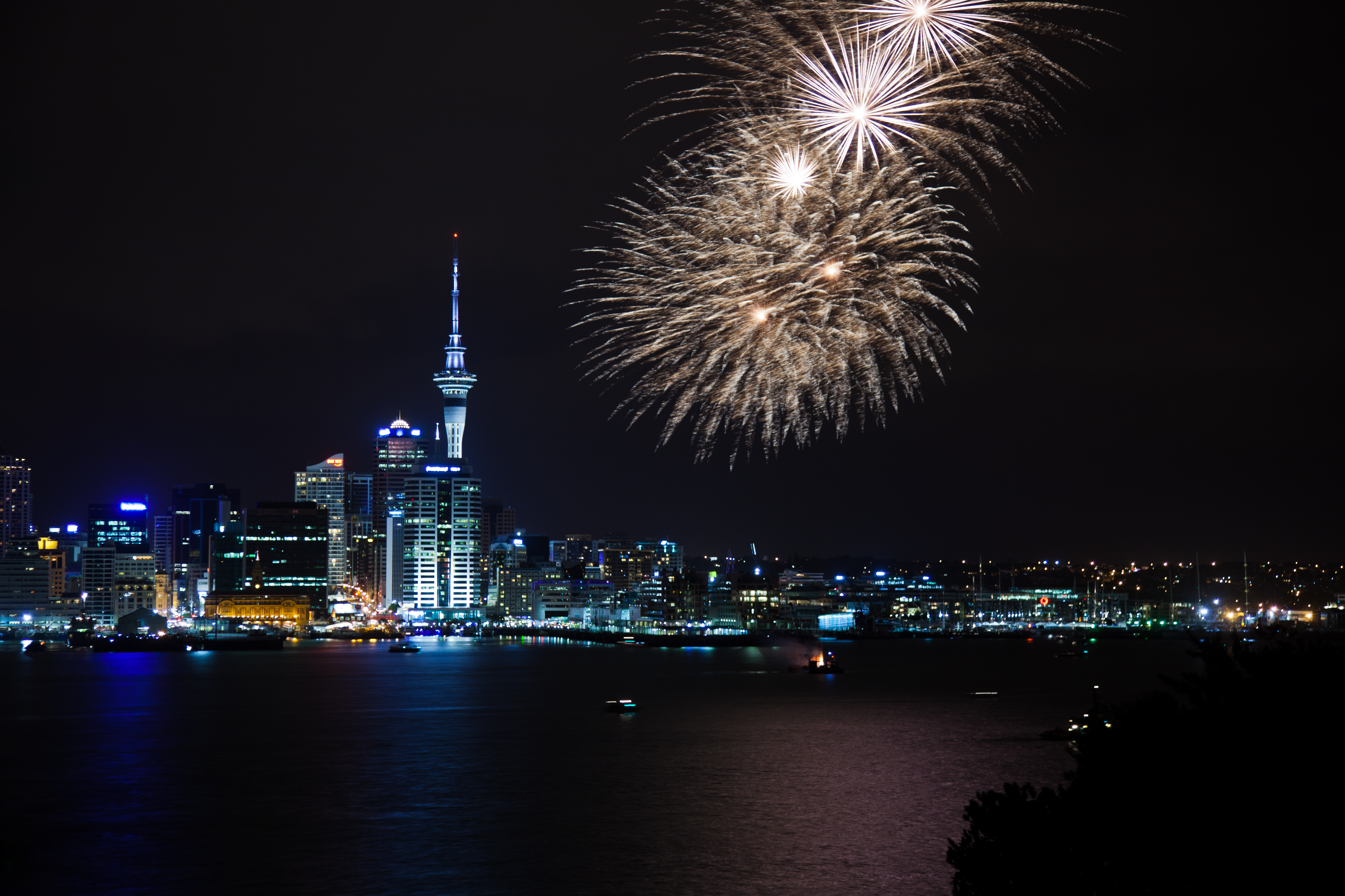
- Fireworks for the 2011 Auckland Anniversary Day
- Also called: Northland Anniversary Day (locally in that region)
- Observed by: former Auckland Province, New Zealand
- Date: Monday closest to 29 January
- 2025 date: 27 January
- 2026 date: 26 January
- 2027 date: 1 February
- 2028 date: 31 January
- Frequency: annual

Auckland Anniversary Day is a public holiday observed in the northern half of the North Island of New Zealand, being the area's provincial anniversary day. It is observed throughout the historic Auckland Province, even though the provinces of New Zealand were abolished in 1876. The modern area of observation consists of all of the Northland (where it is known as Northland Day), Auckland, Waikato, Bay of Plenty and Gisborne regions, as well as some parts of the Manawatū-Whanganui and Hawke's Bay regions north of the 39th parallel. The holiday falls on the Monday closest to 29 January, the anniversary of the arrival of William Hobson, later the first Governor of New Zealand, in the country in 1840.

== History ==
Auckland Anniversary Day was established by Governor Hobson's direction, over Willoughby Shortland's signature, in 1842. The New Zealand Government Gazette of 26 January 1842 (Volume 2, 4th edition) carried a notice stating,

Saturday, the 29th instant, being the SECOND ANNIVERSARY of the establishment of the Colony, His Excellency the Governor has been pleased to direct that day to be held as a GENERAL HOLIDAY on which occasion the Public Offices will be closed.

The choice of 29 January appeared strange, as Hobson stated that it was on the following day that he proclaimed British Sovereignty in New Zealand. On 30 January 1840 the Union Jack was flown on the masthead of HMS Herald, the ship that brought Hobson to the Bay of Islands. That day the flag was also saluted by guns. By all accounts, 30 January should have been chosen for the anniversary day.

In 1841, there was no capacity for arranging anniversary celebrations, as the national capital was in the process of being shifted from Okiato to Auckland. In 1842, 30 January fell on a Sunday so the anniversary day was "Saturdayised."

Daniel Pollen, who was Premier in 1875–1876 and a member of the Legislative Council, was determined to have this inaccuracy rectified. Upon his request, a joint committee of the Legislative Council and the House of Representatives was tasked to prepare a report. On 11 September 1894, the committee's report recommended for the anniversary date to be shifted to 30 January, and that it apply as an anniversary of all of New Zealand, as it was the founding of the nation. The Liberal Government, however, saw no need to change any of the existing arrangements.

The Waitangi Day Act 1960 allowed any area of the country to substitute a Waitangi Day holiday for its provincial anniversary day. This was done for Northland in 1963 through the Waitangi Day Amendment Act passed by the second National Government.

== Events ==
The Auckland Anniversary Regatta, the largest single-day regatta in the world, takes place on this holiday.

Since 2011, Auckland Anniversary Day has been the first day that state and state integrated schools outside of the former Auckland Province can open for the year (the last day being 7 February). However, as schools are not permitted to open on public holidays, schools in the former Auckland Province cannot open until the day after.
