= Musi Triboatton =

Boat race in Indonesia

Logo of Musi Triboatton

Musi Triboatton is an annual international boat race held in South Sumatra, Indonesia since 2012. This race takes place along more than 500 kilometres (310 mi) stretch on the Musi River, one of the biggest rivers in Sumatra Island, from Tanjung Raya on its upper stream in western South Sumatra to the provincial capital city of Palembang, the oldest city in Indonesia. It features three water sports: rafting, canoeing, and dragon boat racing.

== Stages ==
There are five stages in Musi Triboatton

- Stage 1 : Tanjung Raya - Tebing Tinggi (35 kilometres (22 mi))
- Stage 2 : Tebing Tinggi - Muara Kelingi (140 kilometres (87 mi))
- Stage 3 : Muara Kelingi - Sekayu (165 kilometres (103 mi))
- Stage 4 : Sekayu - Pengumbuh (108 kilometres (67 mi))
- Stage 5 : Pengumbuh - Palembang (75 kilometres (47 mi))
