= Kammer =

Kammer (German) translates to chamber. It is used as an affix in words such as Kammersänger and Schatzkammer.

Kammer (Dutch, Afrikaans) translates to comber. It is used as an affix in words such as Wolkammer.

Kammer as a surname may refer to:

- Fred Kammer (1912–1996), American ice hockey player and amateur golfer
- Salome Kammer (born 1959), German actor, singer and cellist

Kammer as a placename may refer to:

- Kammer (Traunstein), village in Traunstein, Germany, former municipality
- Kammer Castle, water castle in Schörfling am Attersee, Austria
