= Kamer 2 Sailing Marathon =

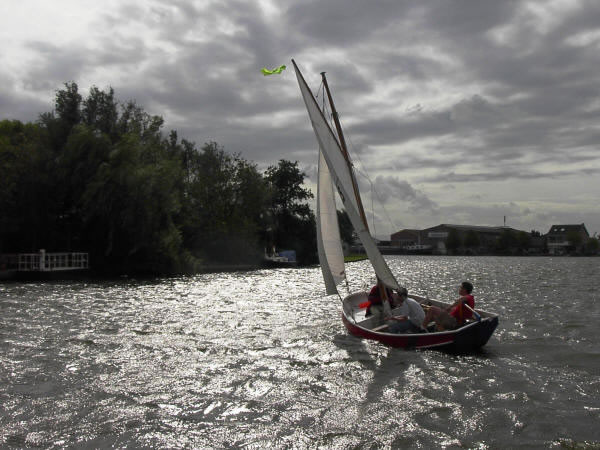
A participant of the Kamer 2 Sailing Marathon on the Ringvaart.

The Kamer 2 Sailing Marathon was a 50 kilometer steeplechase type regatta for sloops in the lake district between Amsterdam and Leiden in The Netherlands. The race is held each year in September and attracts some 70 participants. Boats can be crewed by a team of three or, for all female teams, four. The race leads from the Kaag Lake through Does and Wijde Aa to the Braassemermeer and from there through the Ringvaart to the Westeinderplas. There a turning point is situated directly beneath the watertower of Aalsmeer from where the race goes back along the Ringvaart to the Kaag Lake.

A significant part of the route leads through narrow waterways with fixed bridges. As a result, the competition is restricted to sloops with masts that can be lowered and raised easily. Some of the canals are too narrow to be negotiable upwind by sail. Therefore, participants are allowed to paddle, punt or tow their sloops to overcome trajectories that offer prohibitive circumstances for sailing. When winds are strong the Kamer 2 Sailing Marathon is essentially a sailing race. In quiet weather, however, paddling and mast handling skills can become crucial for victory. Due to the length and difficulty of the route, it is not unusual that more than half of the participants do not reach the finish line in time (before dusk).

The Kamer 2 Race was first organized in 1992 by Hanz Zwart, the first non-Frisian winner of the Brio Race, a similar contest over 60 kilometers held each year in Friesland in May. Since 2003 the race is organized by a group of sailing centres in Kaag Village. From 1999 through 2003 the race was dominated by the Hoogenboom family team. In 2008 the race was cancelled due to lack of interest, and the race has not been organized since.
