= Women's Boat Race 1934 =

4th Women's Boat Race
- Date: 10 March 1934
- Winner: Oxford
- Margin of victory: 3 seconds
- Overall record (Cambridge–Oxford): 2–2

The 4th Women's Boat Race took place on 10 March 1934. The contest was between crews from the Universities of Oxford and Cambridge and was held on the River Thames.

== Background ==
The first Women's Boat Race was conducted on The Isis in 1927.

== Crews ==
Cambridge were represented by Newnham while Oxford saw a mix of rowers from St Hugh's and Oxford Home-Students.

Seat	Cambridge		Oxford	
Seat	Name	College	Name	College
Bow	K. M. Green	Newnham	M. Morant	Oxford Home-Students
2	S. G. Harrison	Newnham	M. C. Heathcote	Oxford Home-Students
3	H. Guest	Newnham	A. Ebrand	Oxford Home-Students
4	A. Demery	Newnham	K. Harris	St Hugh's
5	M. A. Packer	Newnham	L. M. Bristowe	Oxford Home-Students
6	M. K. Barnes	Newnham	S. Aldwinckle	Oxford Home-Students
7	K. England	Newnham	L. Priestly	Oxford Home-Students
Stroke	C. D. Phipps	Newnham	K. L. Box	Oxford Home-Students
Cox	D. M. Simpson	Newnham	R. B. Harrison	St Hugh's

== Race ==
The contest was won by Oxford, 3 seconds ahead of Cambridge, with the victory taking the overall record in the competition to 2–2.

== See also ==
- The Boat Race 1934
