= Kmer =

Kmer may refer to:

- Khmer people, mostly in Cambodia.
- KMER AM radio station in Kemmerer, Wyoming, USA.
- k-mer, all the possible substrings of length k that are contained in a string, typically considered for DNA sequences in computational genomics.
