= Women's Boat Race 1929 =

2nd Women's Boat Race
- Date: 16 March 1929
- Winner: Cambridge
- Winning time: 3 minutes 32 2/5 seconds
- Overall record (Cambridge–Oxford): 1–1

The 2nd Women's Boat Race took place on 16 March 1929. The contest was between crews from the Universities of Oxford and Cambridge and held on the River Thames along a half-mile course.

== Background ==
The first Women's Boat Race was conducted on The Isis in 1927. No race was held in 1928.

== Crews ==
Cambridge were represented by Newnham while Oxford saw a mix of St Hilda's and Oxford Home-Students.

Seat	Cambridge		Oxford	
Seat	Name	College	Name	College
Bow	E. M. Furtado	Newnham	Hodd	St Hilda's
2	M. Hall	Newnham	Collingwood	St Hilda's
3	M. W. Young	Newnham	Montgomery	Oxford Home-Students
4	D. A. Payne	Newnham	Cattle	Oxford Home-Students
5	M. Crosseley	Newnham	Fenning	Oxford Home-Students
6	D. J. Thompson	Newnham	Hammond	Oxford Home-Students
7	G. M. Wiseman	Newnham	Boyd	St Hilda's
Stroke	M Hill	Newnham	Francombe	Oxford Home-Students
Cox	M Evans	Newnham	Harris	St Hilda's

== Race ==
The crews were forbidden from racing side-by-side, so Cambridge rowed the 0.5-mile (0.80 km) course first, followed by Oxford. The contest was won by Cambridge in a time of 3 minutes 32.4 seconds, beating Oxford by 0.4 seconds. The victory took the overall record in the competition to 1–1.

== See also ==
- The Boat Race 1929
