= Interscholastic Sailing Association =

The Interscholastic Sailing Association also known as ISSA is the organization that serves as the governing authority for all sailing competition between both public and private secondary schools throughout the United States. The organization's headquarters is located in Barnstable, Massachusetts.

== History and organization ==
The ISSA was formed in 1930 to govern sailing regattas between preparatory schools in New England. Now, the ISSA is organized into seven District Associations within ISSA that schedule and administer regattas within their established regions:

- New England Schools Sailing Association
- Middle Atlantic Scholastic Sailing Association
- South Atlantic Inter-Scholastic Sailing Association
- South East Inter-Scholastic Sailing Association
- Midwest Inter-Scholastic Sailing Association
- Northwest Inter-Scholastic Sailing Association
- Pacific Coast Inter-Scholastic Sailing Association

Individual schools are also responsible for scheduling dual meets and team-racing events.

Although there are over 350 high schools across the United States that field varsity sailing teams, relatively few of these schools own their own boats. Instead, most schools have established partnerships with community sailing organizations, colleges, or yacht clubs in order to gain access to a fleet of boats. Additionally, most high school sailing teams are involved with fundraising.

Many high school sailors go on to participate in college sailing (governed by the Intercollegiate Sailing Association). Both college varsity teams and club teams recruit high school sailors.

The ISSA partners with Vanguard Sailboats to help sponsor its national regattas.
