= New England Interscholastic Rowing Association =

NEIRA logo

The New England Interscholastic Rowing Association (NEIRA) is an organization that holds an annual race for high school rowing on Lake Quinsigamond in Worcester, Massachusetts for school throughout New England. The first regatta was held in 1947, and only coxed fours and eights were raced. In 1962, singles were added at lunch, but eliminated in 2012. Girls were added in 1974.

The race distance is currently 1500 meters (as for many scholastic regattas in the U.S.). Originally, NEIRA eights raced one mile and fours three-quarters of a mile. Fours and singles moved to 1500 meters in 1970, and all crews raced 1500 m in 1972.

== Course Records ==
NEIRA course records for the 1500 meter course.

Event	School	Year	Time
Boys' Fours	Belmont Hill	2025	4:41.6
Boys' Eights	St. Paul's	1995	4:12.5
Girls' Fours	Nobles and Greenough	1996	5:18.3
Girls' Eights	Phillips Exeter	2008	4:46.6
