= Vienna Nightrow =

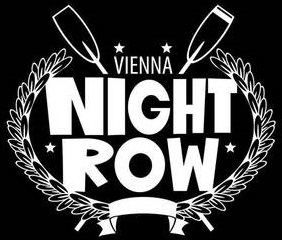
- Host country: Austria
- Date: 28 June 2014
- Venue(s): Old Danube
- Cities: Vienna
- Website: www.vienna-nightrow.com

Vienna Nightrow is an annual international sprint rowing regatta in Vienna (Austria) of the Erster Wiener Ruderclubs LIA for eights at night.

== Concept ==
A team of former rowers, trainers, functionaries of rowing clubs, referees and functionaries of the Austrian rowing federation have set the aim to promote the rowing sport in several media, so they tried to create a new attractive form of this sport. Vienna Nightrow is a rowing regatta, which is held on a 350 meters race course on the Old Danube in Vienna. The heats of the regatta start in the early afternoon and proceed to the finals, which are held in the dark and floodlight. Next to the eights, there are also rookie corporate teams which start in the quad scull.

== Vienna Nightrow 2011 ==
Vienna Nightrow had been held on Saturday, 2 July 2011 for the first time.

19 eights from Germany, Austria and Switzerland started. Next to the eights there competed four corporate teams.

Position	Women 8+	Men 8+	Mixed 8+	Juniors Men 8+
1	Austria 1.WRC LIA	Austria RV Austria	Austria RGM WSV Ottensheim/RV Austria	Austria RGM 1.WRC LIA/RV Friesen
2	Austria WRC Pirat	Austria RGM 1.WRC LIA/RV Wiking Linz	Austria WRC Donaubund	Austria RGM 1.WRC LIA/RV Friesen/RV Wiking Bregenz
3	Austria RGM 1.WRC LIA/RV Friesen	Germany Mannheimer RV Amicitia	Austria WRC Pirat	Austria WSV Ottensheim

Participating clubs:

- Austria Erster Wiener Ruderclub LIA
- Austria Ruderverein Friesen
- Austria Ruderverein Austria
- Austria Ruderverein Normannen
- Austria Ruderverein Staw
- Austria Ruderverein Wiking Bregenz
- Austria Ruderverein Wiking Linz
- Austria Wassersportverein Ottensheim
- Austria Wiener Ruder Club Donaubund
- Austria Wiener Ruderclub Pirat
- Germany Mannheimer Ruderverein Amicitia von 1876
- Switzerland Grasshoppers Club Zürich

Participating companies:

- Krammer&Friends
- m.schneider
- Österreichischer Automobil-Club
- Wien Energie

== Vienna Nightrow 2012 ==
Vienna Nightrow 2012 was held on Saturday, 30 June 2012 for the second time.

32 eights from Great Britain, Italy, Slovakia, Slovenia, Hungary and Austria started. Next to the eights there competed fourteen corporate teams.

Position	Women 8+	Men 8+	Mixed 8+	Juniors Women 8+	Juniors Men 8+	Corporate 4x+
1	Austria 1.WRC LIA	Austria RV Austria	Austria 1.WRC LIA	Austria 1.WRC LIA	Austria WSV Ottensheim	TU Wien IBPM
2	Austria RV Wiking Linz	Austria 1.WRC LIA	Austria 1.WRC LIA	Austria RV Wiking Linz	Austria 1.WRC LIA	Arealis Immobilien
3	Austria WRC Pirat	Slovenia Primorska Univerza	Austria RV Austria	-	Austria RV Friesen	m.schneider

Participating clubs:

- Austria Erster Wiener Ruderclub LIA
- Austria Gmundner Ruderverein
- Austria Ruderverein Friesen
- Austria Ruderverein Austria
- Austria Ruderverein Normannen
- Austria Ruderverein Wiking Linz
- Austria Ruderverein Staw
- Austria Ruderverein Villach
- Austria Wassersportverein Ottensheim
- Austria Wiener Ruder Club Donaubund
- Austria Wiener Ruderclub Pirat
- Austria Wiener Ruderklub Argonauten
- Austria Wiener Ruderklub Donau
- United Kingdom Crabtree Boat Club
- Hungary Tisza Evezős Egylet
- Italy Canottieri Lecco
- Slovenia Primorska Univerza
- Slovenia Studentsko Veslasko Drustvo
- Slovakia Rowing Club Slávia STU Bratislava
- Slovakia Slnava Piestany

Participating companies:

- Arealis Immobilien
- BDO Austria
- Donau-Universität Krems
- Hotel Flemings International
- IFUB
- Krammer&Friends
- Lomography la sardina
- m.schneider
- Profil-Reiseverlag
- Technische Universität Wien
- TU Wien IBMP
- Vienna-LED
- Wien Energie

== Vienna Nightrow 2013 ==
Vienna Nightrow was held on Saturday, 29 June 2013 for the third time.

37 eights from Belgium, Germany, Italy, Croatia, Poland, Slovakia, Slovenia, Hungary and Austria started. Next to the eights there competed twelve corporate teams. In 2013 there had been a cooperation with the University of Vienna at the Vienna Nightrow, so next to the club eights there competed five teams of universities of Europe.

Position	Women 8+	Men 8+	Mixed 8+	Juniors Women 8+	Juniors Men 8+	University 8+	Corporate 4x+
1	Germany Crefelder RC	Germany FRG Germania	Austria RGM 1.WRC LIA/RV Friesen	Austria RGM WSV Ottensheim/RV Wiking Linz	Austria RGM 1.WRC LIA/RV Staw	Croatia Ruderteam Universität Zagreb	TU Wien IBMP
2	Austria RGM WSV Ottensheim/RV Wiking Linz	Austria RV Austria	Austria RV Austria	Austria RGM 1.WRC LIA/WRC Donaubund	Austria WSV Ottensheim	Poland Ruderteam Universität Warschau	Wien Energie
3	Austria 1.WRC LIA	Austria RGM 1.WRC LIA/RV Staw	Austria RGM 1.WRC LIA/RV Staw	Belgium Studentsport Limburg	Austria RV Friesen	Italy Ruderteam Universität Venedig	RGM GV Karner KG/Vienna LED

Participating clubs:

- Austria Erster Wiener Ruderclub LIA
- Austria Gmundner Ruderverein
- Austria Ruderclub Mondsee
- Austria Ruderteam Universität Wien
- Austria Ruderverein Austria
- Austria Ruderverein Ellida
- Austria Ruderverein Friesen
- Austria Ruderverein Normannen
- Austria Ruderverein Seewalchen
- Austria Ruderverein Wiking Linz
- Austria Ruderverein Staw
- Austria Ruderverein Villach
- Austria Salzburger Ruderklub Möve
- Austria Union Ruderverein Pöchlarn
- Austria Wassersportverein Ottensheim
- Austria Wiener Ruder Club Donaubund
- Austria Wiener Ruderclub Pirat
- Austria Wiener Ruderklub Argonauten
- Austria Wiener Ruderklub Donau
- Belgium Studentsport Limburg
- Croatia Ruderteam Universität Zagreb
- Croatia Vk Tresnjevka
- Germany Crefelder Ruderclub
- Germany Frankfurter RG Germania 1869
- Germany Neusser Ruderverein
- Germany Ruderclub Germania Düsseldorf
- Germany Ruderteam Universität Passau
- Hungary Györi Vizügy
- Italy Ruderteam Universität Venedig
- Poland Ruderteam Universität Warschau
- Slovenia Rowing Club Ljubljanica
- Slovakia Slnava Piestany
- Slovakia Rowing Club Slávia STU Bratislava

Participating companies:

- Arealis Immobilien
- Caldersys Austria
- ETI - Express Travel International
- Gebäudeverwaltung Karner KG
- m.schneider
- Maillog
- The Red Bulletin
- SAE Institute
- SMN Investment Services
- TU Wien IBMP
- Vienna-LED
- Wien Energie
