= Women's Boat Race 1936 =

6th Women's Boat Race
- Date: 29 February 1936
- Winner: Oxford
- Margin of victory: 1/2 length
- Winning time: 2 minutes 15 seconds
- Overall record (Cambridge–Oxford): 2–4

The 6th Women's Boat Race took place on 29 February 1936. The contest was between crews from the Universities of Oxford and Cambridge and held on the River Thames.

== Background ==
The first Women's Boat Race was conducted on The Isis in 1927.

== Crews ==
Cambridge were represented by Newnham while Oxford saw a mix of St Hugh's and Oxford Home-Students.

Seat	Cambridge		Oxford	
Seat	Name	College	Name	College
Bow	S. Edmonds	Newnham	G. Stather-Hunt	St Hugh's
2	J. Hymans	Newnham	E. Johnstone	Oxford Home-Students
3	W. Shaw	Newnham	M. Beale	Oxford Home-Students
4	P. Colling	Newnham	B. George	Oxford Home-Students
5	H. Guest	Newnham	M. Lovegrove	Oxford Home-Students
6	N. Demery	Newnham	P. Dolby	Oxford Home-Students
7	J. Strothers	Newnham	P. Walker	Oxford Home-Students
Stroke	B. Poole	Newnham	L. Dillon	Oxford Home-Students
Cox	M. Pearce	Newnham	R. Weaver	St Hugh's

== Race ==
The race took place between Godstow and Binsey along the Upper River Thames.

The contest was won by Oxford with a margin of 1/2 a length, in a time of 2 minutes 15 seconds. The victory took the overall record in the competition to 4–2 in their favour.

== See also ==
- The Boat Race 1936
