= Virginia Scholastic Rowing Association =

- Sport: Rowing
- Jurisdiction: Virginia
- Abbreviation: VASRA
- Affiliation: Scholastic Rowing Association of America

Official website
- www.vasra.org

The Virginia Scholastic Rowing Association (VASRA) is a 501(c)(3) that promotes and supports scholastic rowing in Virginia and sponsors and conducts competitive rowing regattas for high schools in Virginia.

It was an organizational member of USRowing, the national governing body for the sport of rowing in the United States, until 2024.

VASRA runs 8-9 regattas during the scholastic spring season. Most events are on the Occoquan Reservoir at Sandy Run Regional Park, only the Charlie Butt Regatta is on the Potomac River and is run from Thompson Boat Center. VASRA conducts the Virginia Scholastic rowing Championships, which is available for all teams from the state and is a qualifying event for SRAA (Scholastic Rowing Association of America) Championship and USRowing Youth Nationals.

== History ==
VASRA was established by five Virginia high schools in 1979 as the "Northern Virginia Rowing Association". In 1986, it became the “Northern Virginia Scholastic Rowing Association”, and later the "National Capital Scholastic Rowing Association". The latest name became official in 2008.

In 1999, the association co-hosted the Scholastic Rowing Association of America championships.

It currently operates with 43 high school members. Rowing is considered a club sport in many of the participating high schools. Though not funded by most of the school districts participating, most coaches are a $0 employee of the schools, they do provide over-site to the programs. VASRA abides by the regulations of Virginia High School League, where applicable, though not currently a member of the organization.

== Championship ==
VASRA runs the Virginia Scholastic Rowing Championships, which is a qualifier for the SRAA Championships.

The Championship Regatta uses the following point scheme. A trophy is awarded to each of two divisions for men and women. Division 1 is for schools with 20 or more competitors on their roster, and Division 2 for those with fewer.

	1st	2nd	3rd	4th	5th	6th	7th	8th	9th	10th	11th	12th
1st 8+	46	34	26	20	16	14	12	10	8	6	4	2
2nd 8+	24	26	20	16	14	12						
Jr 8+	24	26	20	16	14	12						
Ltwt 8+	26	18	12	8	6	4						
1st 4+	26	20	16	14	12	10	8	6	5	4	3	1
2nd 4+	20	16	13	14	10	9						
Jr 4+	20	16	13	11	10	9						
Ltwt 4+	16	12	9	11	5	3						
1st 4x	12	8	5	7	2	1						
2x	8	6	4	3	2	1						
Ltwt 2x	8	6	4	3	2	1						
1x	6	5	4	3	2	1						
