= West Highland Yachting Week =

West Highland Yachting Week is a sailing regatta that moves from centre to centre, providing an ever-changing scene for competitors, both afloat and ashore. It is based in Oban, Tobermory (Isle of Mull) and Croabh on the west coast of Scotland. It is usually held in the first week of August each year.

== History ==
The event began in 1882 when the committee of Royal Highland Yacht Club held a regatta in Oban in two classes - yachts under forty tons and yachts over forty tons. In 1947 the three local sailing clubs - Royal Highland Yacht Club, Oban Sailing Club and Western Isles Yacht Club - agreed to combine their separate regattas to provide one significant event, with each club contributing two days towards a six-day regatta. In due course the management of the event was handed over to a Joint Regatta Committee comprising five representatives from each club, with additional co-opted members, and this is how it is managed today although Western Isles Yacht Club are no longer part of the Joint Regatta Committee. West Highland Yachting Week has since become one of the leading international yachting events, with a combination of round the buoys and passage racing, supported by an extensive social programme.

== The Racing ==
This year there are three feeder races which help to gather the whole fleet together at Craobh Marina. The seventieth anniversary regatta sees the reinstatement of the feeder race from the Clyde, now running from Largs to Ardrishaig on Friday 28 July, and the races from Gigha and Oban to Craobh on Saturday 29 July. Entertainment is provided onshore at Craobh on the two evenings the fleet is based there.

On Sunday yachts race in the area off Craobh, around Shuna and Loch Melfort. On Monday the race is from Craobh up to Oban, which is the base until Wednesday morning. While in Oban, some yachts take up moorings or anchor off the Esplanade, off Oban Sailing Club, or at one of the local marinas, but for 2017, the new Oban Transit Marina at the North Pier should be open to welcome the fleet.

Tuesday sees the return of the Round Lismore Race, which can only be run on certain years when tides are suitable due to the strong tidal influences around the island of Lismore. This race gives the challenge of narrow channels, many natural hazards, and close views of beautiful shorelines.

On Wednesday the fleet races up the Sound of Mull to Tobermory. Thursday sees the fleet racing off Tobermory an around the northern end of the Sound of Mull, Friday sees the final race back down the Sound of Mull to Oban for the final night's celebrations, which will this year take place at Dunstaffnage Marina.

The event sees yachts passing over 100 miles of coastline, but no doubt actually covering many times that distance whilst racing.

== Dates ==
West Highland Yachting Week will be held from 28 July to 4 August 2017 when it celebrates its 70th anniversary.
