= Boat race (disambiguation) =

A boat race is a sports event in which boats, or other types of watercraft, race on water.

Boat race may also refer to:

- The Boat Race, an annual rowing contest between the universities of Oxford and Cambridge
  - The Women's Boat Race, the same competition for women
- Henley Boat Races, a series of competitions on the Thames River in London
- Indira Gandhi Boat Race, annual boat race in Kerala, India
- The Boat Race (film), a 2009 drama film starring Sergi Lopez
- Boat race (game), a drinking game
