= American Henley Regatta =

The American Henley Regatta was a popular and inclusive regatta for the sport of rowing in the United States. Unlike the national championship regattas of the National Association of Amateur Oarsmen, which focussed primarily on boat clubs as participants, the American Henley included, in addition to boat clubs, colleges and secondary schools. The first regatta was held in 1903 in Philadelphia, and was meant to be equivalent to the Henley Royal Regatta in the United Kingdom. The regatta was alternately held in Philadelphia and Boston. It was run by the American Rowing Association. The distance was one mile, 550 yards (2,112 m), the same as that of the Henley Royal.

In 1970, the ARA moved the regatta to Lake George. An American Henley Regatta was reported in the New York Times as late as 1979, when it was held at Orchard Beach Lagoon. Sagamore Rowing Association held an American Henley Regatta in Oyster Bay in 2017, but the 2018 regatta was cancelled.
