= Scholastic Rowing Association of America =

- Sport: Rowing
- Jurisdiction: United States and Canada
- Abbreviation: SRAA
- President: John Musial

Official website
- www.sraa.net

The Scholastic Rowing Association of America was formed as the Schoolboy Rowing Association of America in 1935 to host an unofficial national championship regatta for high school rowing. The name was changed in 1976 after women were allowed to compete.

== Qualifying regattas ==
The following regattas are regional qualifiers for the SRAA National Championships.

- Florida Scholastic Rowing Association Championships
- Midwest Scholastic Rowing Association Championships
- Garden State Scholastic Championship
- New York State Scholastic Championship
- Philadelphia City Championship
- Virginia Scholastic Rowing Championships
- Washington Metropolitan Interscholastic Rowing Association Championships
- West Coast Scholastic Championships
