= Leonard Spangenberg =

American architect

Leonard Reese Spangenberg, Jr.
- Born: November 3, 1925
- Died: September 12, 2007 (aged 81); Covington, Louisiana, U.S.
- Citizenship: United States
- Education: Tulane University
- Occupation: Architect
- Practice: Leonard R. Spangenberg Jr. & Associates
- Buildings: Plaza Tower; Unity Temple

Leonard Reese Spangenberg Jr. (1925 ― 2007) was an architect whose residential and commercial designs were built primarily in New Orleans, Louisiana, although he had others elsewhere in North America and the Middle East. His training as an architect included serving as an apprentice of Frank Lloyd Wright. He was the founder and principal architect of Leonard R. Spangenberg Jr. & Associates. Spangenberg's distinctive designs included the Plaza Tower skyscraper and the Unity Temple of New Orleans.

== Biography ==
Spangenberg was born on November 3, 1925, in New Orleans, Louisiana, United States. He served in the United States Navy in the latter part of World War II. He subsequently became an apprentice to architect Frank Lloyd Wright. Spangenberg was a Taliesin Fellow at Wright’s Spring Green, Wisconsin, studio in the years 1946 and 1947. (Note: Spangenberg and Albert C. Ledner were the two Wright-trained architects in New Orleans.) In this way, Spangenberg was first exposed to the design practices of organic architecture.

On completion of his Taliesin Fellowship, Spangenberg enrolled at the Tulane University School of Architecture, graduating from there in 1950. He then served as Wright's supervising apprentice for construction of the Wright-designed Welbie L. Fuller Residence (Note: The Fuller Residence was destroyed in 1969 by the effects of Hurricane Camille.) in Pass Christian, Mississippi.

Following the Welbie L. Fuller Residence project, Spangenberg founded Leonard R. Spangenberg Jr. & Associates, and he remained the principal architect of the firm for the remainder of his professional career.

Spangenberg died in 2007 in Covington, Louisiana, where he had been living toward the end of his life.

== Architectural designs ==
Through his architectural career, Spangenberg continued to make use of organic architecture, combining it with design related to the southeast Louisiana environment. His distinctive designs in the New Orleans metropolitan area included the Plaza Tower skyscraper and the Unity Temple of New Orleans. Spangenberg designed various residential properties in the New Orleans area and other projects elsewhere in the United States, Mexico, and the Middle East.

=== Unity Temple ===
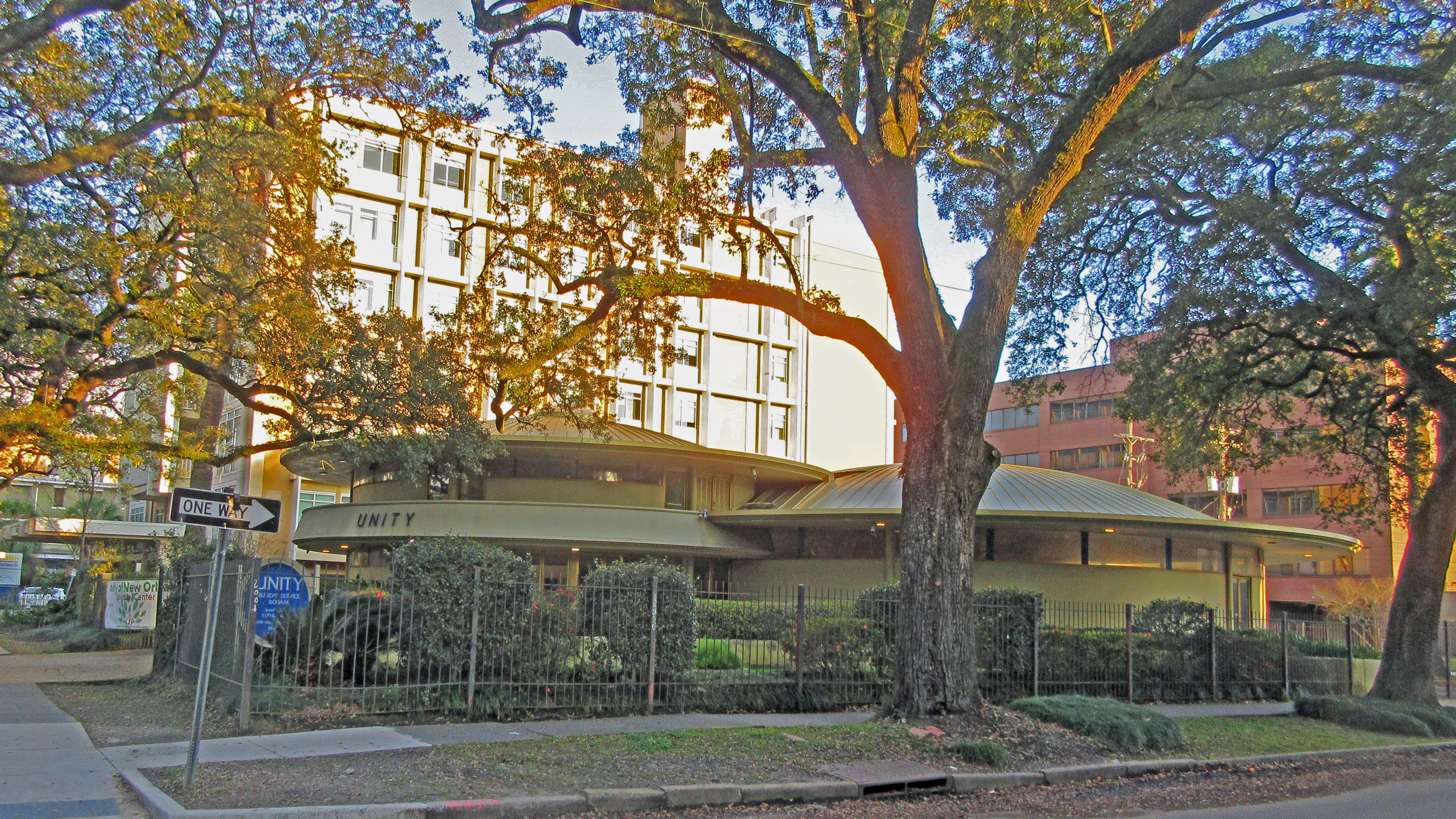
Unity Temple (New Orleans), as seen in 2019

Spangenberg and his firm were commissioned in 1960 to design a new house of worship for the congregation of the Unity of New Orleans Spiritual Center at their location on St. Charles Avenue in New Orleans. The congregation instructed Spangenberg to design a house of worship that was circular, so as to symbolize the circular nature of life. In this regard, Spangenberg's architectural design consisted of two contiguous round buildings, one larger than the other and both with dome roofs. The larger of the two buildings is the sanctuary of the place of worship. The smaller building, while taller, houses the administrative offices. The outside of the dome buildings is gold-colored and in places is covered by synthetic rubber. Each of the two buildings has a circular skylight at the center of the doom roofs. The circular motif continued with the interior design which includes a circular sanctuary, pulpit, staircases, choir loft, and other interior features. The building totaled 10,000 square feet in useable space. The construction was complete in 1961, at a cost of $170,000 (US dollars).

=== Plaza Tower ===
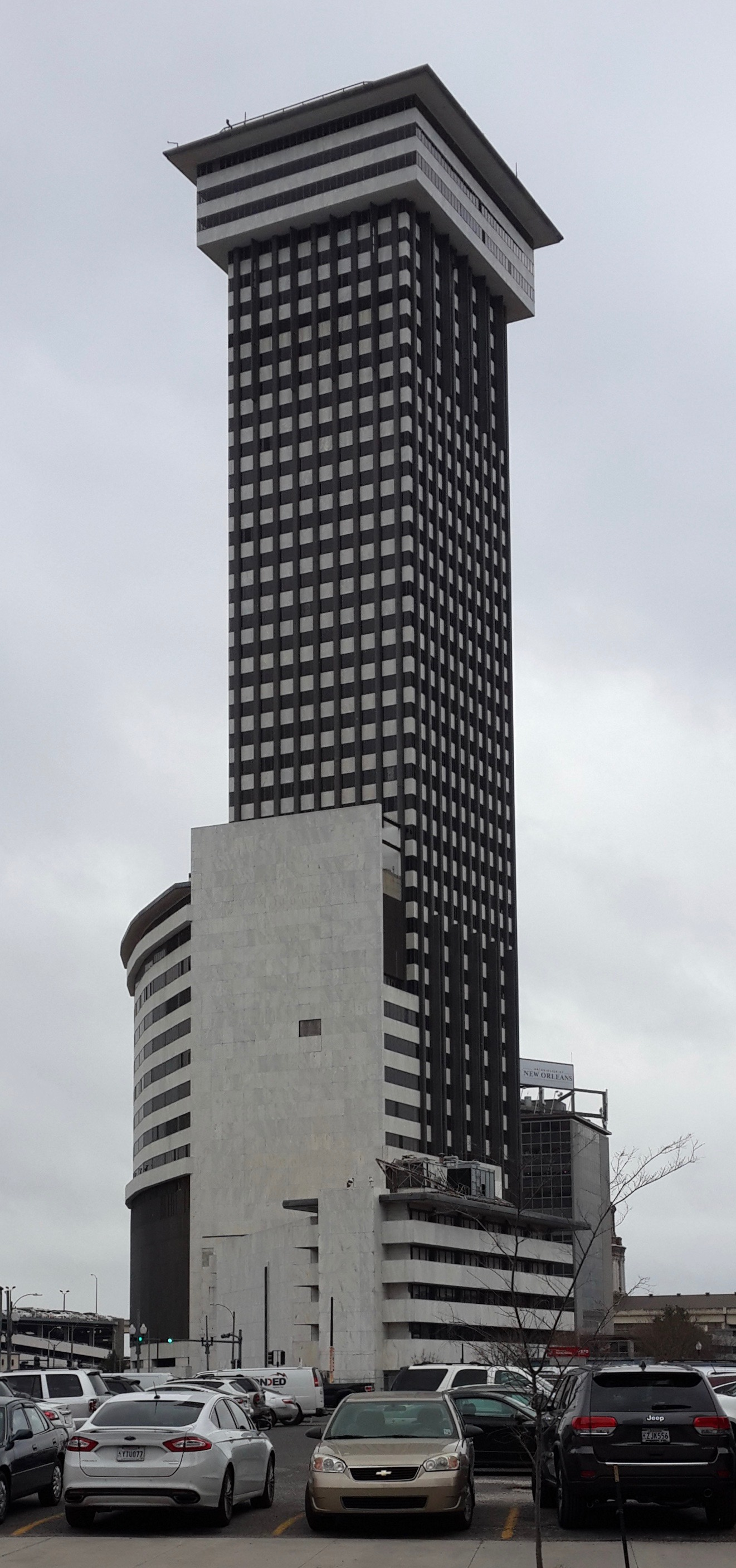
Plaza Tower, as seen in 2016

Spangenberg's design work on the Plaza Tower office and apartment building began in 1964. While architecturally distinct, the project posed significant engineering challenges and garnered controversy nearly from the start. The location for the building was at the fringe of the New Orleans Central Business District, the intent of the developer being to revitalize that portion of the central business district.

At 531 ft (162 m), the Plaza Tower building was significantly taller than the next tallest building in New Orleans at the time, creating an engineering difficulty in the soft and sometimes unstable Mississippi River Delta soil. For this reason, the foundation included 315 pilings driven to a depth of 168 ft (51 m). These were "friction pilings" and did not directly contact bedrock.

The lead engineer on the project was William J. Mouton of New Orleans. Gordon I. Kuhne and Raymond C. Bergeron, who were associates at Leonard R. Spangenberg & Associates, had important roles in the design of the building.

Financial difficulties of the project resulted in a five year construction time (1964 ~ 1969). The difficulties included a non-payment of architectural fees that were due to Spangenberg's firm.

The finished design of the building is tall and slender, with a square cross section through all of the upper 31 floors. The design includes vertical steel columns covered with bronze-colored aluminum facing through the height of the building providing a contrast to the lighter color of the rest of the building exterior. The tall slender building has a broader three story section that caps the top of the building. The lower 14 floors of the building are much larger in area, and consist of a curved design with a marble facing on one side and wedge-shaped windows along one corner. The lower floors also include an indoor parking area for 325 automobiles.

Following completion of the Plaza Tower, Leonard R. Spangenberg & Associates moved its offices to the building, which is located at 1001 Howard Avenue in New Orleans.

While the Plaza Tower skyscraper remains prominent in the New Orleans skyline, its fate is uncertain. (Note: As of May 2023, the future of the Plaza Tower office building remains controversial. Falling debris from the building had rendered the perimeter of the building hazardous to passers-by.) Plaza Tower has been vacant since 2002 after toxic mold and asbestos were discovered in the building.

Architecturally, the building has been criticized for being overly complex visually, despite its visual prominence. A review by the Society of Architectural Historians stated that the design is "an homage to constructivism, futurism, expressionism, modernism, and the work of Frank Lloyd Wright, although a jumble rather than a distillation. The curved wall, intended to echo the course of the Mississippi River, and the prowlike glass corner give it the semblance of a ship about to sail off into the future." Despite controversy over the architectural features of the building, the building has defenders and is listed on the National Register of Historic Places.

=== Other projects ===
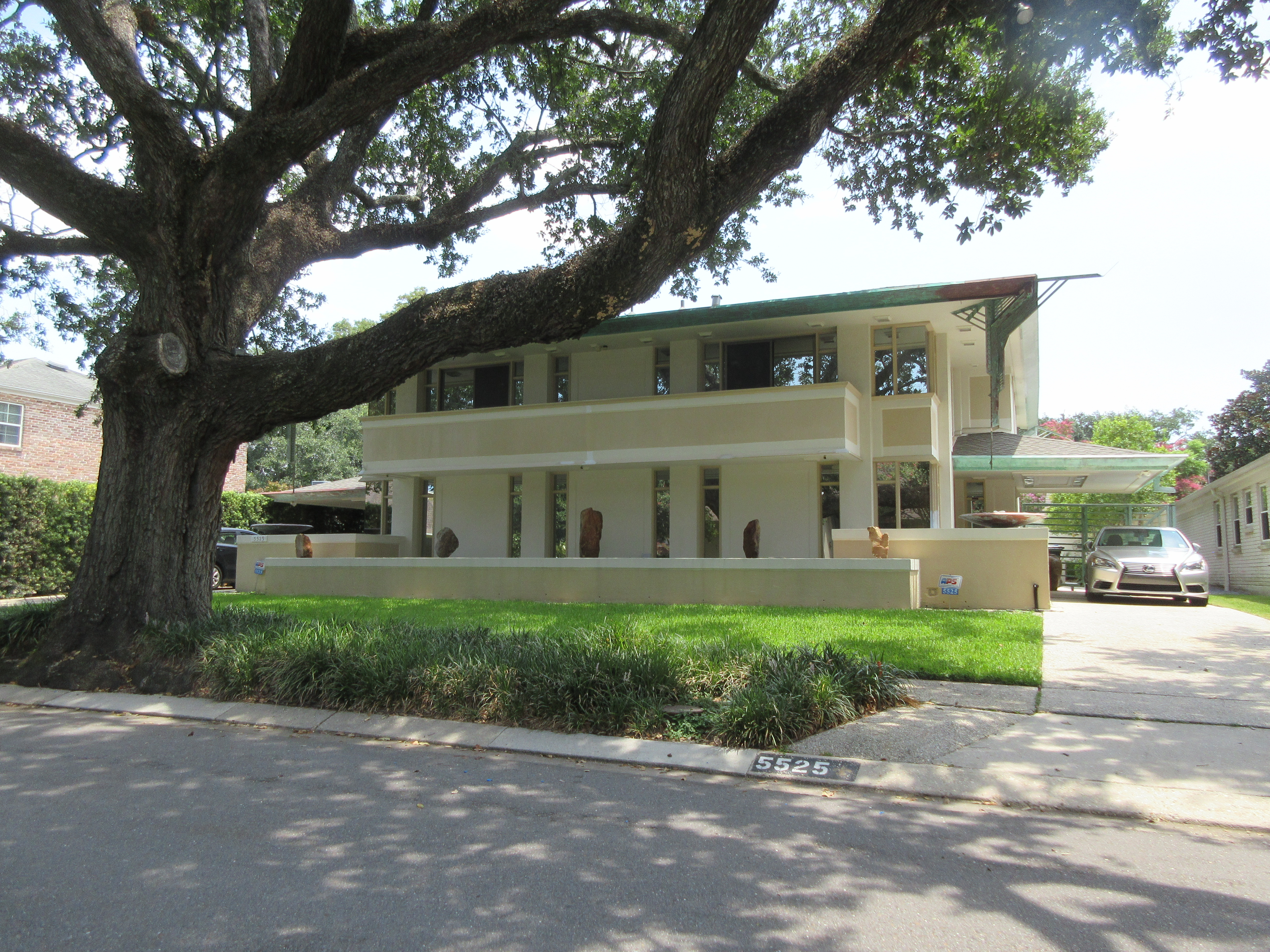
New Orleans residence designed by Spangenberg

External media
- Media links for Leonard Spangenberg
- 1970 listing of Spangenberg by the American Institute of Architects, as posted in Flickr
- Residential design of Spangenberg at 5525 Marcia Avenue in New Orleans, as posted in Flickr

In 1964, Spangenberg designed a 72 story, 1118 room hotel to be built in New Orleans. Despite approval by New Orleans city planners, the hotel was never constructed. It would have been the world's tallest hotel in existence at the time. New Orleans city planners approved the plan which was to be built at 222 O'Keefe Avenue in the New Orleans Central Business District. The hotel was to be named the Place Vendôme, and both the name and the design drew inspiration from the Place Vendôme of Paris.

In 1965, Spangenberg designed the New Orleans Federal Savings & Loan Building on Chef Menteur Highway in New Orleans East. This eight story building consisted of vertical features suggestive of a pier, with arches near the top, and copper fascia. The structure was heavily damaged by the effects of Hurricane Katrina, and, following restoration, the building re-opened as the Chef Tower Apartments. (Note: The Chef Tower Apartments opened as affordable housing.) The restoration preserved most of the key features of the Spangenberg design.

Spangenberg also completed various residential projects, including ones in the Lakeview area of New Orleans and in the Lakewood South development.

Following Spangenberg's death, the Tulane University Southeastern Architectural Archive acquired many of Spangenberg’s architectural plans and drawings, including designs that were not constructed and restoration plans for several buildings in the New Orleans French Quarter.
