= Plaza Tower (New Orleans) =

Skyscraper in New Orleans, Louisiana

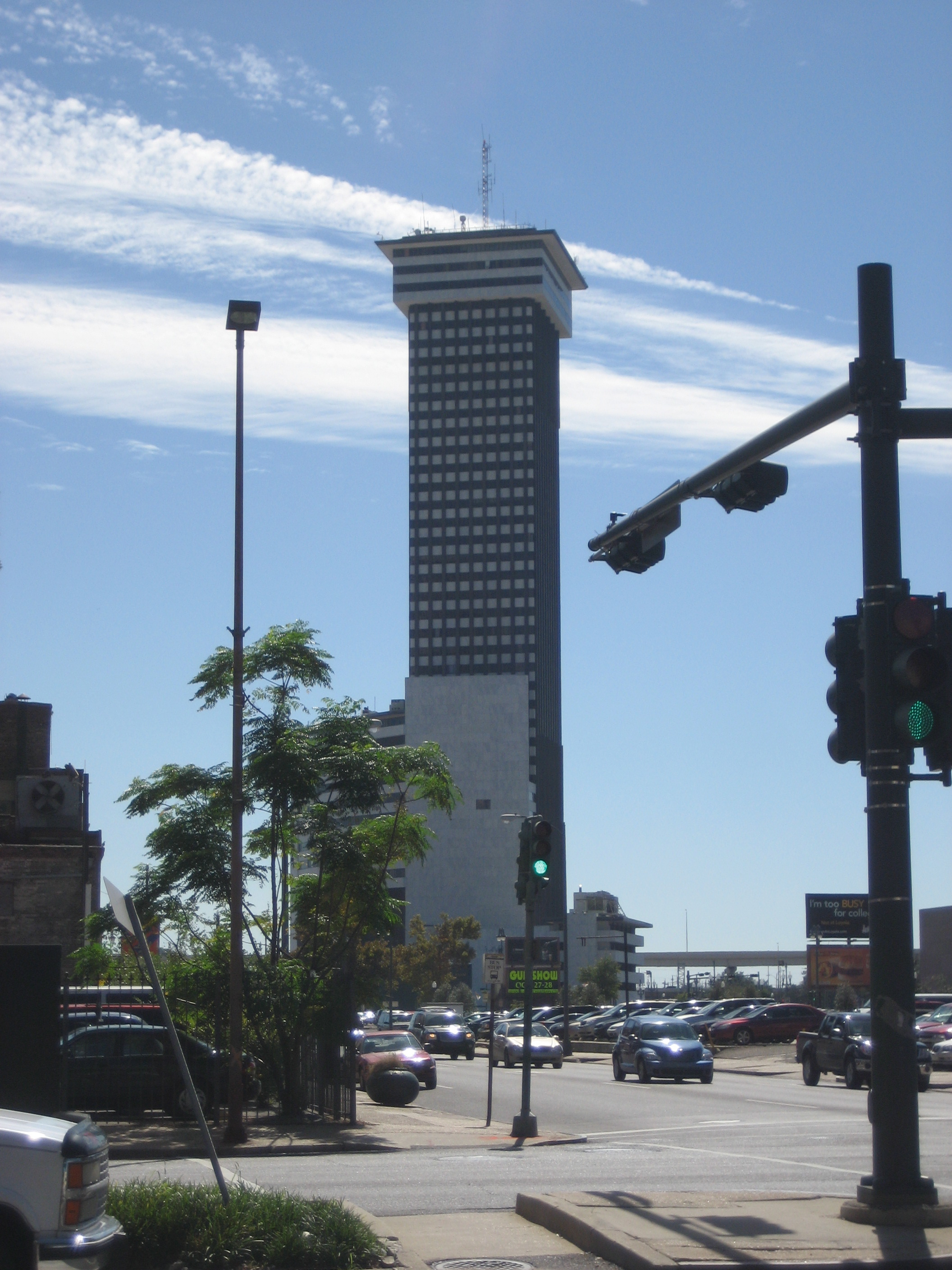
- The Plaza Tower in October 2007

General information
- Type: Residential
- Location: 1001 Howard Avenue; New Orleans, United States
- Coordinates: 29°56′47″N 90°04′36″W
- Construction started: 1964; 62 years ago
- Completed: 1969; 57 years ago
- Renovated: 2006–2008; 18 years ago

Height
- Roof: 531 ft (162 m)

Technical details
- Floor count: 45
- Floor area: 485,000 sq ft (45,058 m^{2})
- Lifts/elevators: 13

Design and construction
- Architect: Leonard R Spangenberg, Jr & Associates

U.S. National Register of Historic Places
- Designated: January 30, 2013
- Reference no.: 12001241

Plaza Tower is a 45-story, 531-foot (162 m) skyscraper in New Orleans, Louisiana, designed in the modern style by Leonard R. Spangenberg, Jr. & Associates. Located in the Central Business District (CBD), it is the third tallest building in both the city of New Orleans and the state of Louisiana.

Subsequent failed redevelopment proposals renamed the building Crescent City Towers and Crescent City Residences.

The building has been unused since 2002 because of toxic mold and asbestos, which have since been remediated.

== History ==
Construction of the Plaza Tower began in 1964 as a project of developer Sam J. Recile, but halted in October 1966. The property was bought out and construction resumed in 1968, and completed in 1969. The Plaza Tower was the tallest building in New Orleans and Louisiana for four years until the Hancock Whitney Center (then called One Shell Square) surpassed it by over 160 feet (49 m).

Along with the World Trade Center on the Mississippi riverfront, the Plaza Tower marked the beginning of modern high-rises in New Orleans. The building has always held a prominent place in the city's skyline, even after the 1970s building boom on along Canal Street and the 1980s boom along Poydras Street. This is due to both its unique design, particularly its "crown top," and its location on the extreme edge of the CBD.

The Plaza Tower was originally designed primarily as an office building with residential space on the upper floors. Upon completion of the tower, very little residential space was made available. By 1984 the remaining residential apartments were made into offices.

In 2001, tenants began to publicly criticize the building's owners for ignoring worsening conditions in the building. Claims were made that a lack of proper maintenance had led to exposure to asbestos and toxic mold. Several class action lawsuits were filed by workers against the owners and managers and their own employers, the Louisiana Department of Social Services and Louisiana Department of Health and Hospitals. In 2002 approximately 700 Louisiana state and New Orleans District Attorney's Office employees relocated en masse to offices on Common Street. Since that time, the building has sat sealed off and unused.

=== Proposed rebirth as Crescent City Towers ===
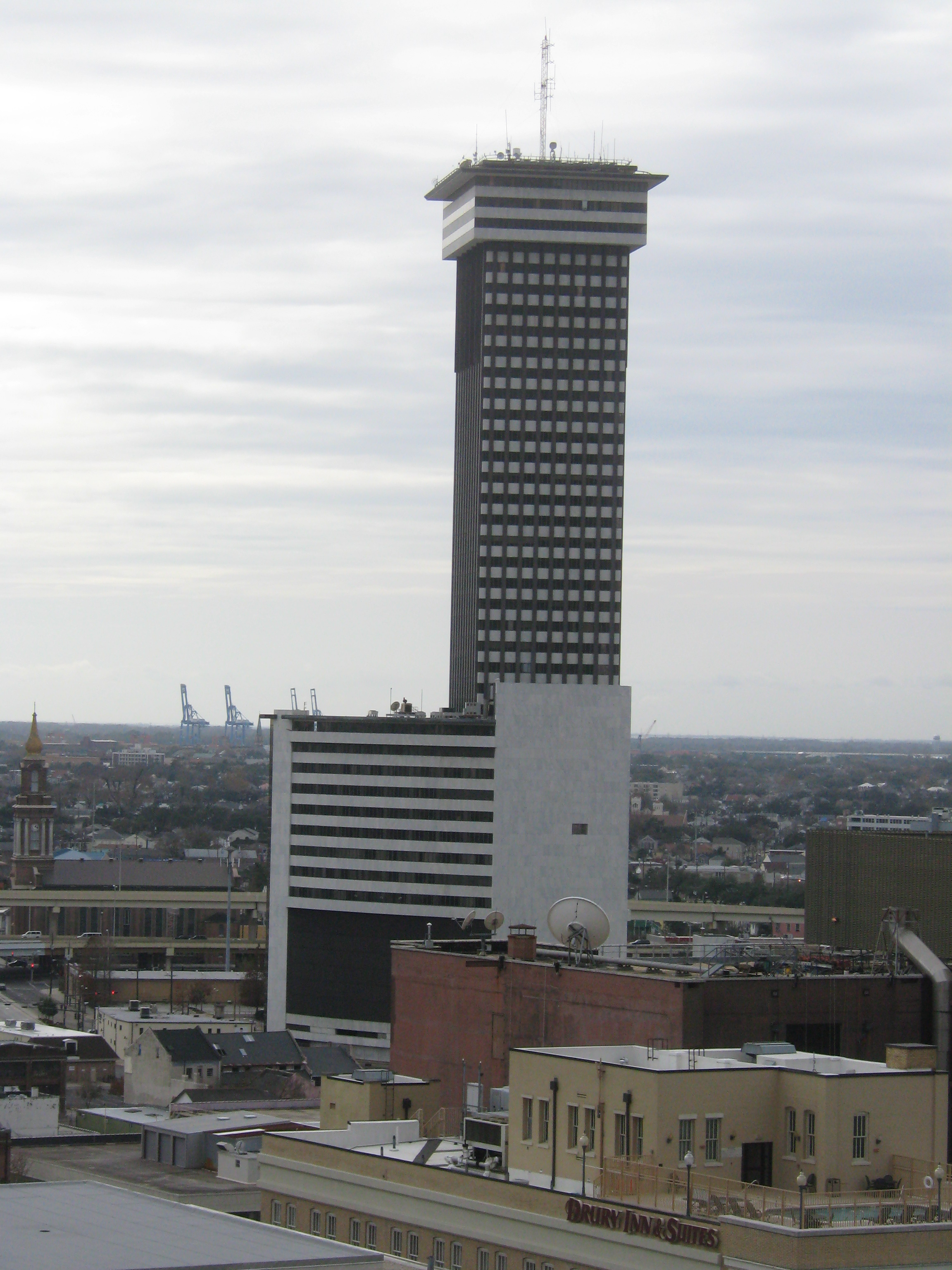
View from the Hilton New Orleans skydeck in 2008

For several years in the late 2000s, a plan was in the news to redevelop Plaza Tower as residential space under the name "Crescent City Towers" or variations on that name.

A plan claimed to begin by gutting the building down to its superstructure, both on the interior and exterior, required because of the building's history with asbestos, toxic mold and water leaks. The proposed new facade would feature a neomodern look, making extensive use of glass and staggered balconies, to provide the units with views of the New Orleans skyline and the Mississippi River. Once complete, the building would have included amenities such as a gourmet restaurant, spa, fitness center, indoor pool and retail space. The renovation of an adjoining building containing a 350-space parking garage and several townhouse units was also planned. The redesign was originally proposed under the name Crescent City Residences.

The architectural team behind the redesign was composed of Williams Architects of New Orleans and Marks Thomas Architects of Baltimore. Dorian M. Bennett Realtors Inc. had exclusive rights to sell the 350 units, with prices starting at $350,000. Unit sizes were determined, but prices were planned to be in the range of $450 per square foot, similar to prices in the French Quarter, and about $100 per square foot higher than the nearby Warehouse District.

In November 2005, Giannasca Development Group announced it had secured $24 million to start the redevelopment project. A construction timetable was being developed in light of delays and logistical issues since Hurricane Katrina, with estimates for an opening date in 2008.

In spring 2006, modified plans were released reflecting changes aimed at addressing post-Katrina concerns. This plans included glass designed to withstand 200 mph (320 km/h) winds, a self-contained electrical generator, and an internal water supply, which developers said could make the building self-sufficient for three to four weeks. The external plans were also going to have a cleaner glass and steel design, removing the needle point and multiedged surfaces of the original building. This new exterior was to consist of gold-tinted wall to wall glass and maroon steel. The price of the project increased from $100 million to $120 million while the number of units has been reduced from 350 to 197. These units were to run from 1,080 square feet (100 m^{2}) starting at $450,000 to several 3,000-square-foot (280 m^{2}) units costing several million dollars. Three quarters of the units were to have only one bedroom. The project also saw a slight name change to the Crescent City Towers.

In July 2007, the owners defaulted on the mortgage and the Plaza Towers was put on the auction block. Howard Acquisitions, LLC already held the mortgage on the building. Their winning bid protected their investment and gave them full control over the high-rise.

On December 19, 2007, Plainfield Direct paid the City of New Orleans $608,000 in back taxes and announced plans to spend $10 million on environmental remediation. This work was eventually completed. Following the remediation work, Plainfield was to partner with developers to put the building back into use.

Such plans were not met with success. In July 2011, the still vacant building was announced to be up for auction with bids due by 20 September. Bryan Burns purchased the building for $650,000 at a private auction in December 2011, although the listed price was $15.5 million in 2010. In September 2014 the building was again sold, this time for an undisclosed amount to Alexandra Land and Development LLC.

=== Debris and fire and continued decay ===
On May 20, 2021, a piece of the Plaza Tower fell from top of the building, injuring one person. This debris caused the closure of many major roads in New Orleans such as parts of Howard Avenue and Loyola Avenue. New Orleans officials and current property owner Joe Jaeger stated that the property would receive new fencing and a net that would catch any more debris, were it to fall off of the building. More roads were subsequently added to the closure list. These closures will be in place until a new fence is put up around the building and when the area is deemed safe for pedestrians. The area around the Plaza Tower reopened on July 16 after the netting was placed.

On January 10, 2022, a fire was reported in the Plaza Tower. Smoke was seen from the roof, escaping via the elevator shafts. New Orleans Fire Department responded and put the flames out that same day.

On 10 January 2023, debris again fell from the long-derelict building, prompting closure of surrounding streets.

On 24 April 2023, a man fell to his death from the Plaza Tower. This came just hours after firefighters put out another fire in the building The building continues to decay as many of the panels have been ripped out of the parking garage structure of the tower. Former New Orleans Mayor Latoya Cantrell explored the possibility of demolishing the building if the structure poses any more safety hazards.

In August 2026, Jacque St. Ann, a 17-year-old male from Belle Chasse, LA, fell to his death after he and a group of friends snuck into the Plaza Tower.

== Architectural reception ==
Architecturally, the Plaza Tower has been criticized for being overly complex visually, despite its visual prominence. A review by the Society of Architectural Historians stated that the design is "an homage to constructivism, futurism, expressionism, modernism, and the work of Frank Lloyd Wright, although a jumble rather than a distillation. The curved wall, intended to echo the course of the Mississippi River, and the prowlike glass corner give it the semblance of a ship about to sail off into the future."

Despite controversy over the architectural features of the building, the building has defenders and is listed on the National Register of Historic Places.

== Location ==
1001 Howard Avenue
New Orleans, LA 70113-2002

The Plaza are bounded by the following streets:

- Howard Avenue (south)
- Loyola Avenue (west)
- Julia Street (north)
- South Rampart Street (east)

== See also ==
- List of tallest buildings in New Orleans
- List of tallest buildings in Louisiana
