= Jesse Keenan =

American professor

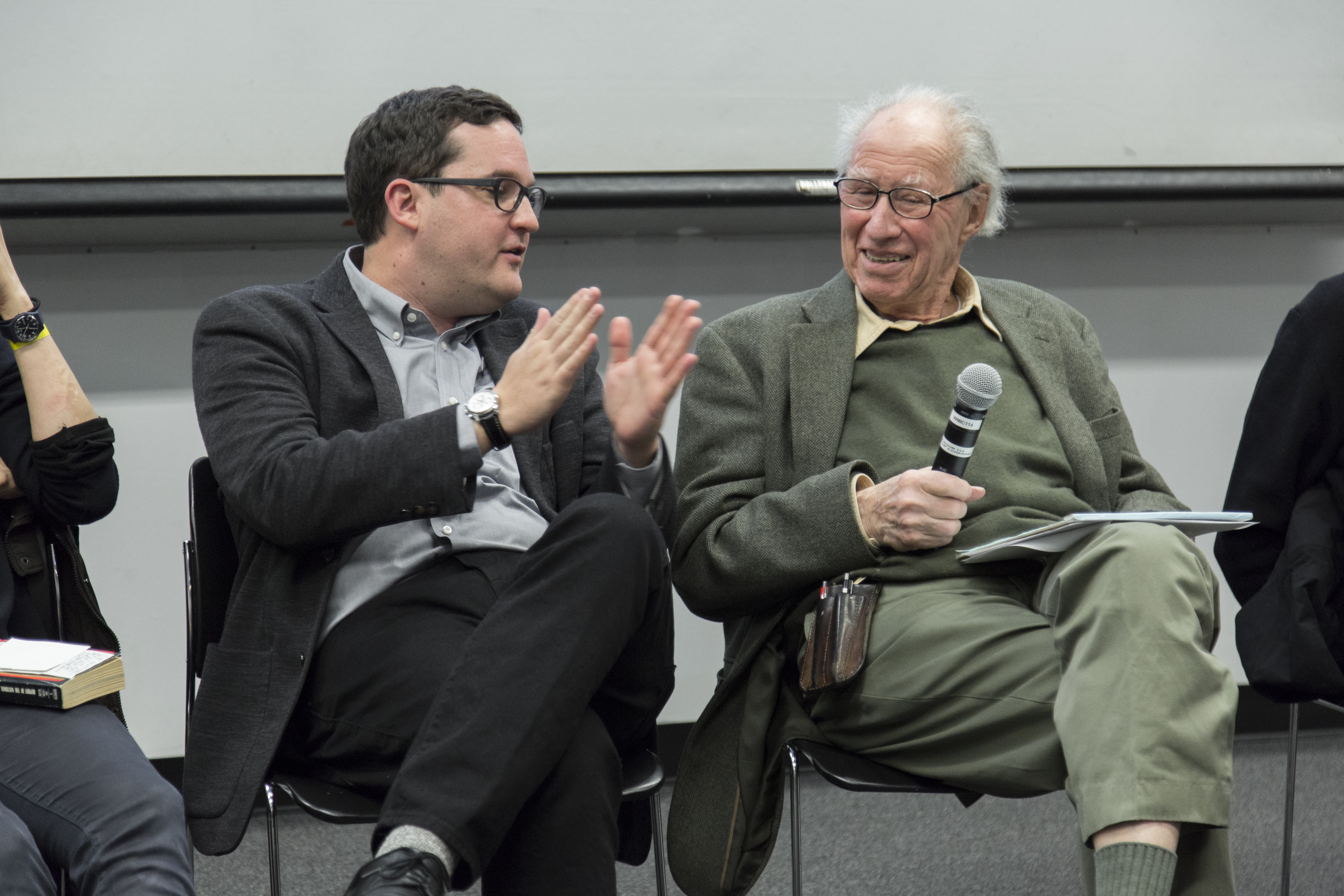
- Keenan speaking with Peter Marcuse at Columbia University in 2016
- Born: Albany, Georgia, United States
- Known for: Climate change, housing, and real estate Climate gentrification
- Title: Favrot II Associate Professor of Sustainable Real Estate and Urban Planning, Tulane University

Academic background
- Education: University of Georgia (A.B.); Georgia State University (J.D.); University of Miami (LL.M.); Columbia University (M.Sc.); Delft University of Technology (Ph.D.)

Jesse M. Keenan is an American professor, lawyer, and urban planner. He is the Favrot II Associate Professor of Sustainable Real Estate and Urban Planning at the School of Architecture and the Built Environment at Tulane University in New Orleans, Louisiana. Keenan was among the first to study the relationships between climate change, real estate, and the built environment in the United States and is credited with advancing the popular concept of climate gentrification.

== Education ==
Keenan received an A.B. in Political Science from the University of Georgia in 2001, followed by a J.D. from Georgia State University School of Law in 2004 and an LL.M. in real property law from the University of Miami School of Law in 2005. While practicing law in Miami and New York, he would go on to complete a Visiting Fellowship in Housing Studies at Harvard's Joint Center for Housing Studies, where he began research on post-disaster housing following Hurricane Katrina. Keenan went on to complete a M.Sc. in real estate development from Columbia University, and a Ph.D. in real estate and spatial planning from TU Delft Faculty of Architecture and the Built Environment. Keenan is a member of the American Institute of Certified Planners.

== Career ==
Keenan served as Research Director of the Center for Urban Real Estate as a member of the faculty of the Graduate School of Architecture, Planning and Preservation at Columbia University, as Area Head of Real Estate and the Built Environment of the faculty of the Graduate School of Design at Harvard University, as a Fellow of Science, Technology and Public Policy at the Harvard Kennedy School at Harvard University, as a Visiting Scholar at the Perry World House at the University of Pennsylvania, and as an Honorary Research Associate in Sustainable Finance at Oxford University.

Keenan's research on climate change and the built environment, includes the development of theories and concepts such as 'climate gentrification,' 'bluelining,' and the 'climate intelligence arms race.' Keenan's books on climate change, include Blue Dunes: Climate Change by Design (Columbia University Press), which chronicled the development of a White House sponsored megaproject following Superstorm Sandy that was designed to protect the New York metropolitan area from sea level rise and climate impacts. His book North: The Future of Post-Climate America (Oxford University Press) examines how climate change is shaping where and how people are living in the face of climate change.

Keenan's public scholarship and commentary on the relationships between climate change, real estate, buildings, housing, urbanization, technology, transportation, infrastructure, higher education, public administration, insurance markets, mortgage markets, the economy, migration, and human mobility, in the United States have been the subject of a variety of media, documentaries, and TV programs, including in Duluth, Minnesota, Boston, Massachusetts, Outer Banks, North Carolina, Miami, Florida, Paradise, California, Los Angeles, California, and across the United States. Keenan has argued that American cities like Duluth and Buffalo, New York are not "climate havens," but their comparatively lower-risk, more moderate climate, cooperative civic politics, environmental resources, and comparative affordability will attract future climate migrants and that these "receiving zones" should plan for future populations by advancing climate mitigation and adaptation investments to decarbonize and derisk their physical built environment.

Keenan was appointed a Visiting Scholar at the Federal Reserve Bank of San Francisco where he led the bank's first major research initiative in climate adaptation. This research culminated in the edited volume, Strategies to Address Climate Change Risk in Low- and Moderate-Income Communities (2019), which The New York Times described "one of the most specific and dire accountings of the dangers posed to businesses and communities in the United States—a threat so significant that the nation's central bank seems increasingly compelled to address it." (October 17, 2019). While at the Federal Reserve Bank of San Francisco, Keenan co-authored a paper that would later become the basis for regulatory modifications to the Community Reinvestment Act that incentivize banks to invest in resilience and hazard mitigation. From 2019 to 2021, Keenan served as a Special Government Employee Advisor to the U.S. Commodity Futures Trading Commission, where he co-led research efforts evaluating the impacts of climate change on financial stability. In this capacity, he served as the co-editor with Leonardo Martinez-Diaz of the publication, Managing Climate Risk in the U.S. Financial System (2020)—the first major climate change publication by a U.S. financial regulator.

Keenan has served as Chair and Vice-Chair of the U.S. Community Resilience Panel on Buildings and Infrastructure Systems under the Obama Administration's White House Climate Action Plan, and he formerly served as a research advisor on climate change for Governors of California and Massachusetts. Keenan was member of the Intergovernmental Panel on Climate Change (IPCC) and three successive U.S. National Climate Assessments. Keenan served as a Senior Economist with the U.S. Army Corps of Engineers at the U.S. Defense Department. There, he worked at the intersection of systems resilience and national security, including supporting the U.S. State Department in the development of the U.S. National Adaptation Plan.

He served as the Executive Producer of the podcast America Adapts. Keenan contributed to exhibitions at the Museum of Modern Art, including Foreclosed: Rehousing the American Dream (2012) and Uneven Growth: Tactical Urbanism and Expanded Megacities (2014). Keenan was first person to exhibit an Excel spreadsheet at the Museum of Modern Art, New York.

== Selected publications ==
=== Books ===
- Keenan, J.M. & Weisz, C. (eds.). (2017). Blue Dunes: Climate Change By Design. New York, NY: Columbia Books on Architecture and the City / Columbia University Press. ISBN 9781941332153
- Keenan, J.M. (2018). Climate Adaptation Finance and Investment in California. London, U.K.: Routledge. ISBN 9780367606671
- Martinez-Diaz, L. & Keenan, J.M. (eds.).(2020). Managing Climate Risk in the U.S. Financial System. Washington, D.C.: U.S. Commodity Futures Trading Commission. ISBN 9780578748412
- Keenan, J.M. (2025). North: The Future of Post-Climate America. New York, NY.: Oxford University Press. ISBN 9780197641613

=== Journal articles ===
- Keenan, J.M. (2015). From Sustainability to Adaptation and Back: A Case Study of Goldman Sach’s Corporate Real Estate Strategy. Building Research & Information, 43(6), 407-422. doi:10.1080/09613218.2016.1085260
- Keenan, J.M. (2017). From Climate Change to National Security: An Empirical Analysis of the Obama Administration’s Federal Resilience Mandates and Measures. Natural Hazards Review, 19(1), 0401722. doi:10.1061/(ASCE)NH.1527-6996.0000273
- Keenan, J.M., Hill, T., & Gumber, A. (2018). Climate Gentrification: From Theory to Empiricism in Miami-Dade County, Florida. Environmental Research Letters, 13(5), 054001. doi:10.1088/1748-9326/aabb32
- Keenan, J.M. (2018). Types and Forms of Resilience in Local Government Planning: Who Does What? Environmental Science and Policy, 88(1), 116-123. doi:10.1016/j.envsci.2018.06.015
- Van den Berg, H. & Keenan, J.M. (2019). Dynamic Vulnerability in the Pursuit of Just Adaptation Processes: A Boston Case Study. Environmental Science and Policy, 94(1), 90-100. doi:10.1016/j.envsci.2018.12.015
- Keenan, J.M. (2019). A Climate Intelligence Arms Race in Financial Markets. Science, 365(6459), 1240-1243. doi:10.1126/science.aay8442
- Siders, A.R. & Keenan, J.M. (2020). Variables Shaping Coastal Adaptation Decisions to Armor, Nourish, and Retreat in North Carolina. Ocean & Coastal Management, 183(1), 105023. doi:10.1016/j.ocecoaman.2019.105023
- Keenan, J.M. & Bradt, J.T (2020). Underwaterwriting: From Theory to Empiricism in Regional U.S. Coastal Mortgage Markets. Climatic Change, 162(1), 2043–2067. doi:10.1007/s10584-020-02734-1
- Keenan, J.M. & Hauer, M. (2020). Resilience for Whom? Demographic Change and the Redevelopment of the Built Environment in Puerto Rico. Environmental Research Letters, 15(7), 074028. doi:10.1088/1748-9326/ab92c2
- Tedesco, M., Keenan, J.M., & Hultquist, C. (2022). Measuring, Mapping, and Anticipating Climate Gentrification in Florida: Miami and Tampa Case Studies. Cities, 131(1), 103991. doi:10.1016/j.cities.2022.103991
