= Albert C. Ledner =

American architect

- Born: January 28, 1924; Bronx, New York
- Died: November 14, 2017 (aged 93); Manchester, New Hampshire
- Education: Tulane University
- Occupation: Architect
- Projects: National Maritime Union
- Design: Organic modernism

Albert Charles Ledner (January 28, 1924 – November 14, 2017) was an American architect, known for his organic and modernist style of architecture. Among his designs are three buildings for the National Maritime Union, located in New York City, originally commissioned in 1958 and built between 1964 and 1968. He also designed approximately 40 homes in the New Orleans metropolitan area and various other projects for the National Maritime Union.

== Personal life and education ==
Ledner was born in Bronx, New York, and moved to New Orleans, Louisiana as a child. His maternal grandparents were from Hungary, and his mother was noted pastry chef Beulah Levy Ledner. Following his graduation from the New Orleans Public School System, Ledner enrolled in the Tulane University School of Architecture. He left college in his second year to volunteer for the United States Army Air Corps in World War II, where he served as a navigator with the rank of second lieutenant. While stationed at Davis-Monthan Field near Tucson, Arizona, Ledner used his leave time during his military career to visit Taliesin West, which was one of the schools run by architect Frank Lloyd Wright. Shortly after his military career, Ledner earned his architectural degree at Tulane University graduating in 1948. He then supplemented his architectural education with studies at Frank Lloyd Wright's Taliesin Spring Green School. (Note: Ledner and Leonard Spangenberg were the two Wright-trained architects in New Orleans.)

Following completion of his formal education, Ledner married Judy, who was a stage actress, with whom he subsequently had three children. His daughter Catherine Ledner became a noted photographer.

== Architectural career ==
External images
- Images of the Albert C. Ledner
- Ledner at the Galatoire residence in New Orleans, image from Flickr
- Ledner in his inventor's workshop in 2013, from the New York Times

Ledner started his independent architectural career in 1951, spending most of his professional career in New Orleans. Through his career as an architect, he followed the "design-build" approach in which the architect remains involved during the construction phase of the project. In this approach, Ledner devised uncommon approaches to structure and uses of construction materials. By remaining involved in the construction phase of the project, he further could revise details in ways not possible in conventional approaches in which the architect is minimally involved in the construction phase of a project. At times, his designs were characterized as quirky while also functional and expressive. Through this approach to architecture, Ledner developed architectural styles that were uniquely his and distinct from his mentor Frank Lloyd Wright.

=== National Maritime Union projects ===
In 1954, Ledner designed and built the National Maritime Union building in New Orleans. The success of the New Orleans project led to his being hired for the much larger National Maritime Union project in New York City. In 1957, he designed and built his own home at 5328 Bellaire Drive in the Lakewood South neighborhood of New Orleans. He lived in this home with his wife and children until the time of his death. The home flooded in 2005 as a result of Hurricane Katrina and was subsequently restored.

The success of the National Maritime Union building in New Orleans led to Ledner's commission in 1958 to design the headquarters for the National Maritime Union building in New York City. The National Maritime Union was flourishing at the time and had need for a headquarters that included offices, hiring halls, residences and training centers for the union members. The first of these buildings was the headquarters of the National Maritime Union located at Seventh Avenue between 12th and 13th Streets. This six-story building was built on two glass block cylinders. It has walls with overhangs and windows suggestive of portholes, intended to be fitting for a hiring hall of maritime sailors.

The second building in Ledner's New York City National Maritime Union project was an annex at 346 West 17th Street, consisting of an eleven-story building with 100 porthole windows on a sloping wall. The last of this project was an annex on Ninth Avenue between 16th and 17th Streets said to look like a pizza box with porthole windows. With the decline of the maritime trade unions by the early 1970s, the union sold these buildings and were subsequently converted to alternative uses.

Ledner designed buildings for similar purposes in Mobile, Alabama; Baltimore, Maryland; Houston, Texas; Galveston, Texas; Norfolk, Virginia; and San Francisco, California. He also designed a building for the 1964 World's Fair in New York City.

=== Residential projects ===
The Kleinschmidt Residence in the Lake Vista neighborhood of New Orleans was Ledner's 1951 project built in a mid-century modern style. This home included clerestory windows with a floor plan providing a light and airy feel. Ledner fabricated light fixtures made of Schlitz beer as another distinguishing feature of the home.

Another of Ledner's early residential projects was the Cointreau House, also in the Park Island neighborhood of New Orleans. This house included skylights and light fixtures fabricated from Cointreau liqueur bottles. This home was featured in the June 1953 issue of House Beautiful magazine.

In 1961, Ledner designed and built a residence on Park Island in New Orleans that came to be known as the "Sunkel House" or the "Ashtray House". A distinguishing feature of this home is its use of 1200 amber-colored glass ashtrays as dentils in its exterior. The name "Sunkel House" came from the original owners of the home, the Sunkel family, who were Ledner's clients. The home was for a time owned by New Orleans Mayor Ray Nagin. Also, on Park Island in New Orleans, Ledner designed and built the "Galatoire House", which made use of the client's extensive collection of antique architectural fixtures, especially stained glass that was obtained from a 19th-century convent. The design involved placing the stained glass in irregular orientations, linked together to form a wall.

Other Ledner residential designs included the Goldate House and the Leonard House, both in New Orleans.

=== Legacy ===
In addition to architectural projects, Ledner designed and built household and office equipment such as light fixtures, tables, and artwork. He also designed various machines for which he obtained three patents. An example of his patented inventions is an emergency descent device to aid people in escaping from tall buildings.

In 2016, filmmaker Roy Beeson, in collaboration with Ledner's daughter Catherine Ledner, produced a documentary film about Ledner entitled "Designing for Life: The Modernist Architecture of Albert C. Ledner". In early November 2017 at the age of 93, Ledner gave a presentation of his work and attended a preview of the film at the New York City Architecture and Design Film Festival. Shortly thereafter, he became ill and died in Manchester, New Hampshire on November 14, 2017.

== Principal architectural works ==
- First Unitarian Universalist Church, 1800 Jefferson Avenue, New Orleans, Louisiana (completed 1957; extant, but as of 2017 a residence).
- National Maritime Union office building, 2731 Tchoupitoulas Street, New Orleans, Louisiana (1954).
- National Maritime Union Headquarters, Joseph Curran Building, 36 Seventh Avenue between W 12th and W 13th Streets, New York City (completed in 1964).
- National Maritime Union, Curran Annex, 355 W 16th Street between Eighth and Ninth Avenues, New York City (completed in 1966; altered in 2007 for use as Dream Hotel).
- National Maritime Union, Curran Plaza, 363 West 16th Street at 9th Avenue, New York City (completed in 1968).

== Gallery ==
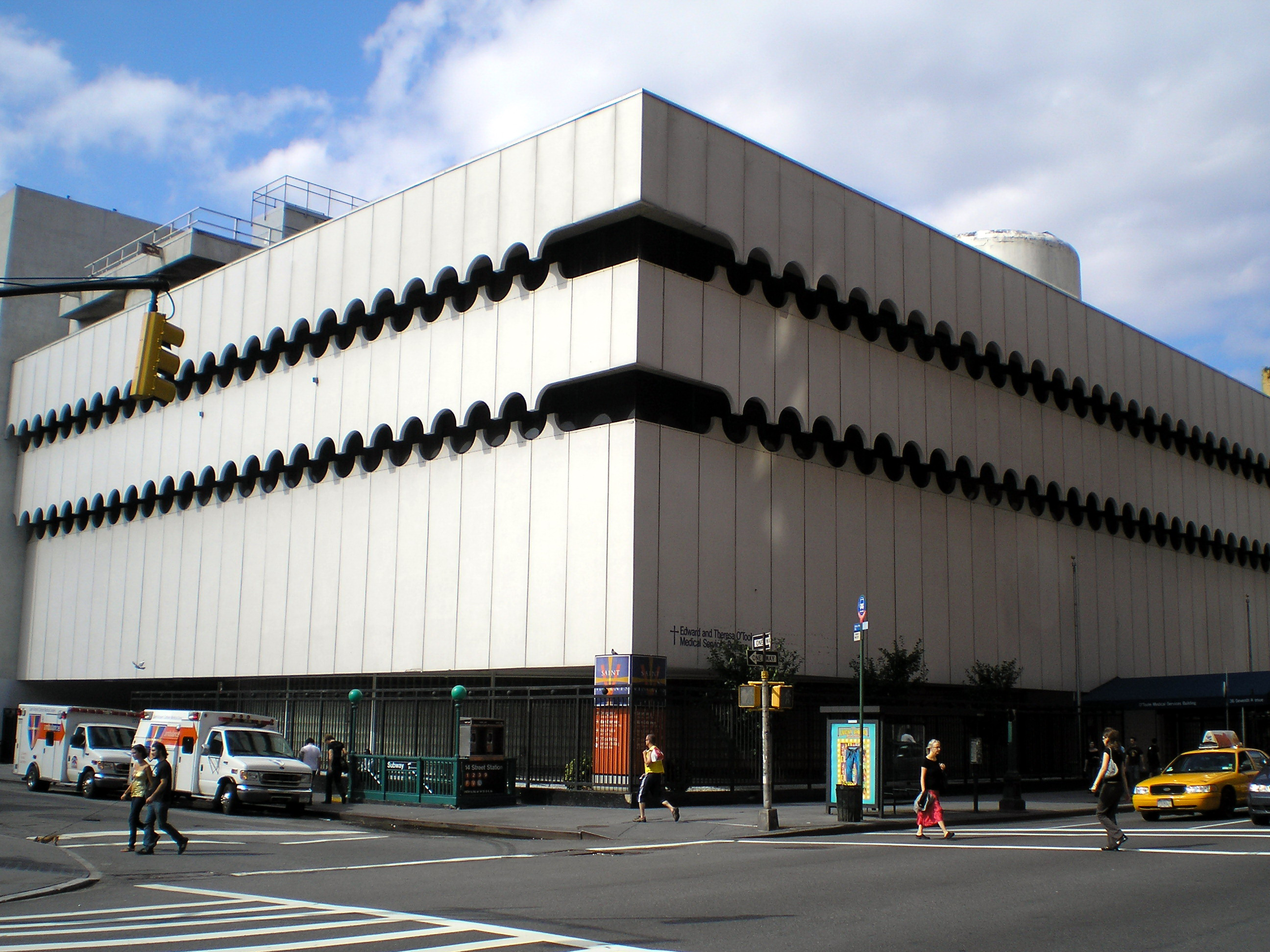
National Maritime Union Headquarters, New York City (completed in 1964)

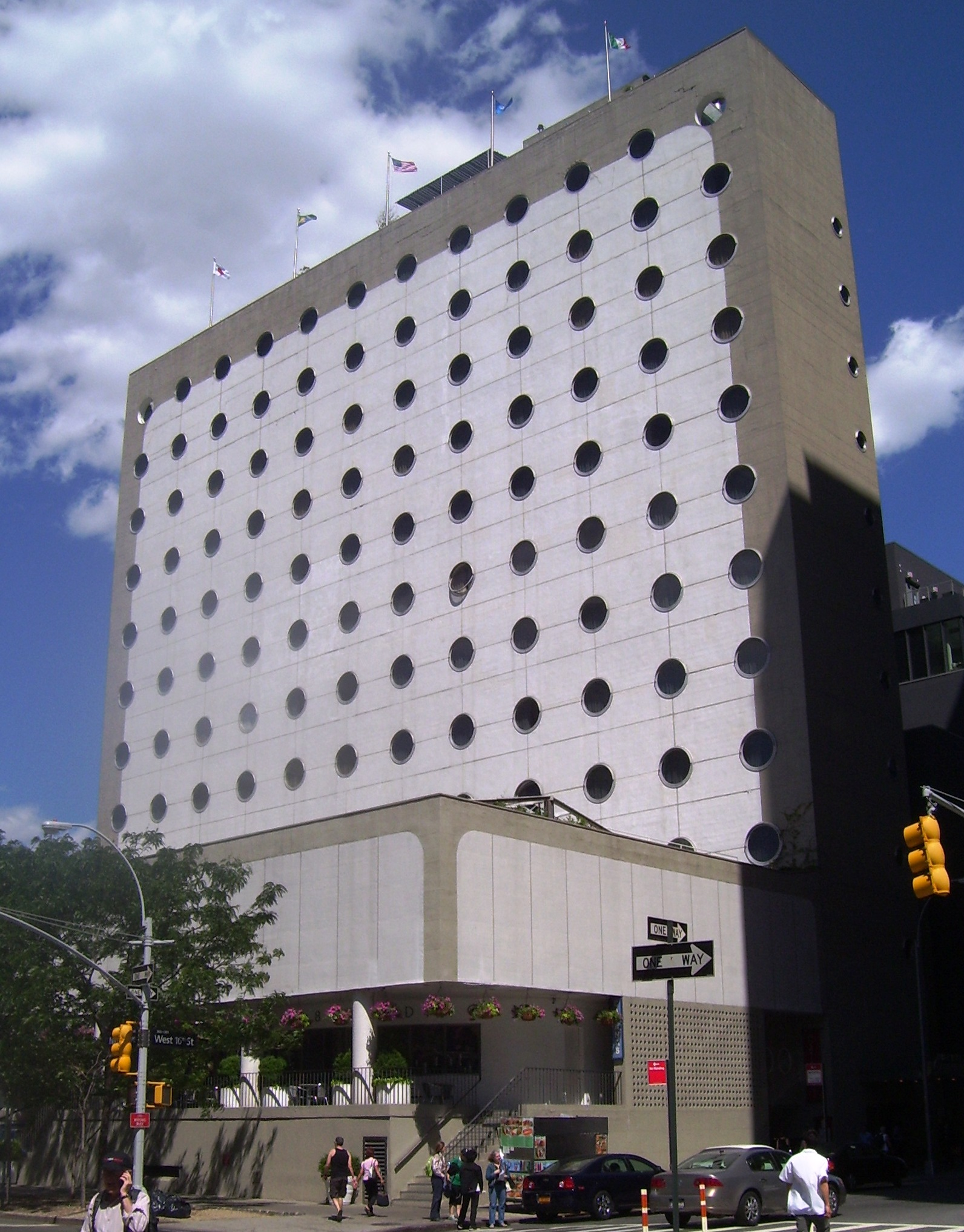
National Maritime Union, Curran Plaza, New York City (completed in 1968; converted in 2003 to Maritime Hotel)

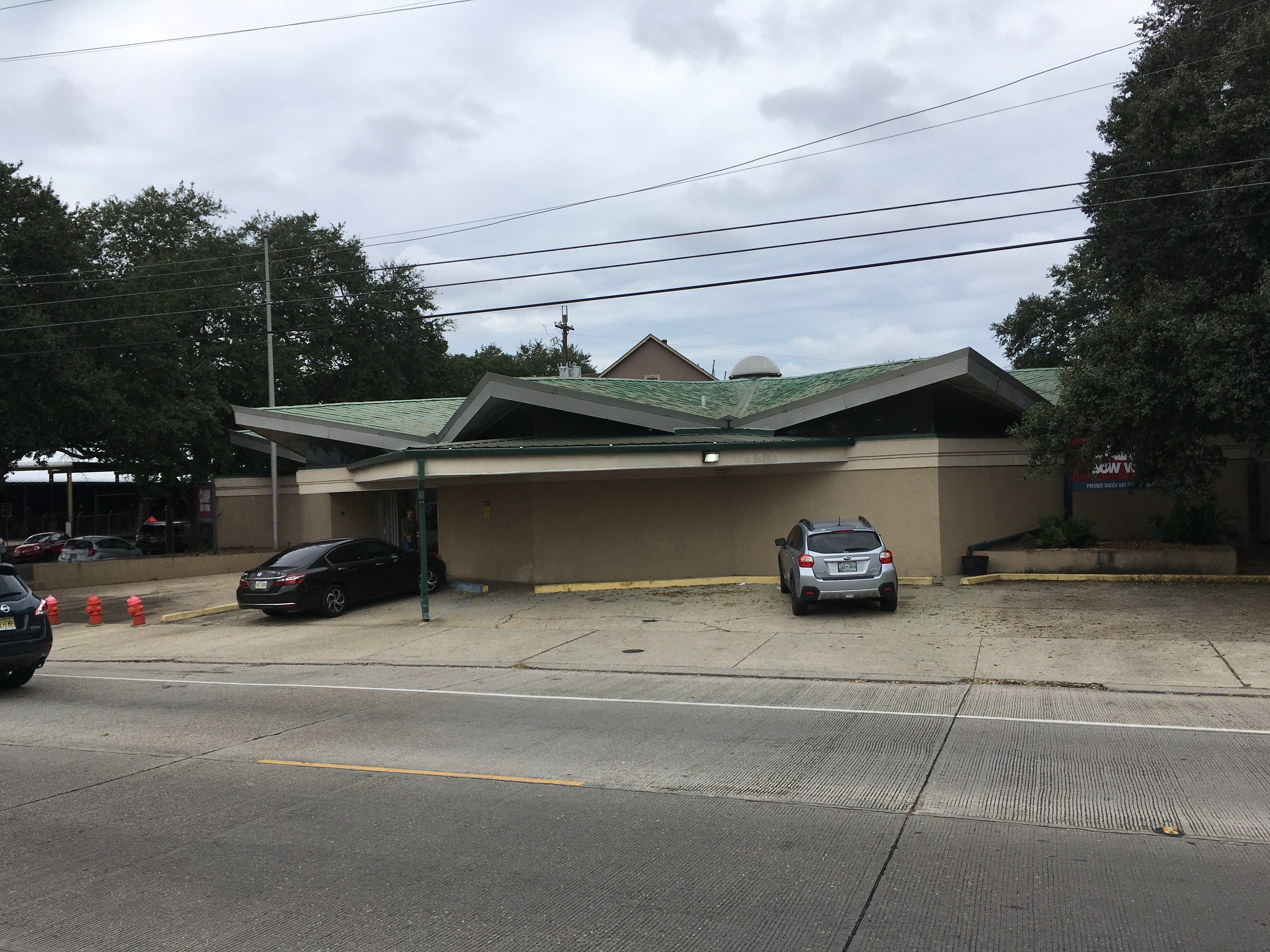
National Maritime Union Building in New Orleans (completed in 1954; houses small businesses as of 2019)

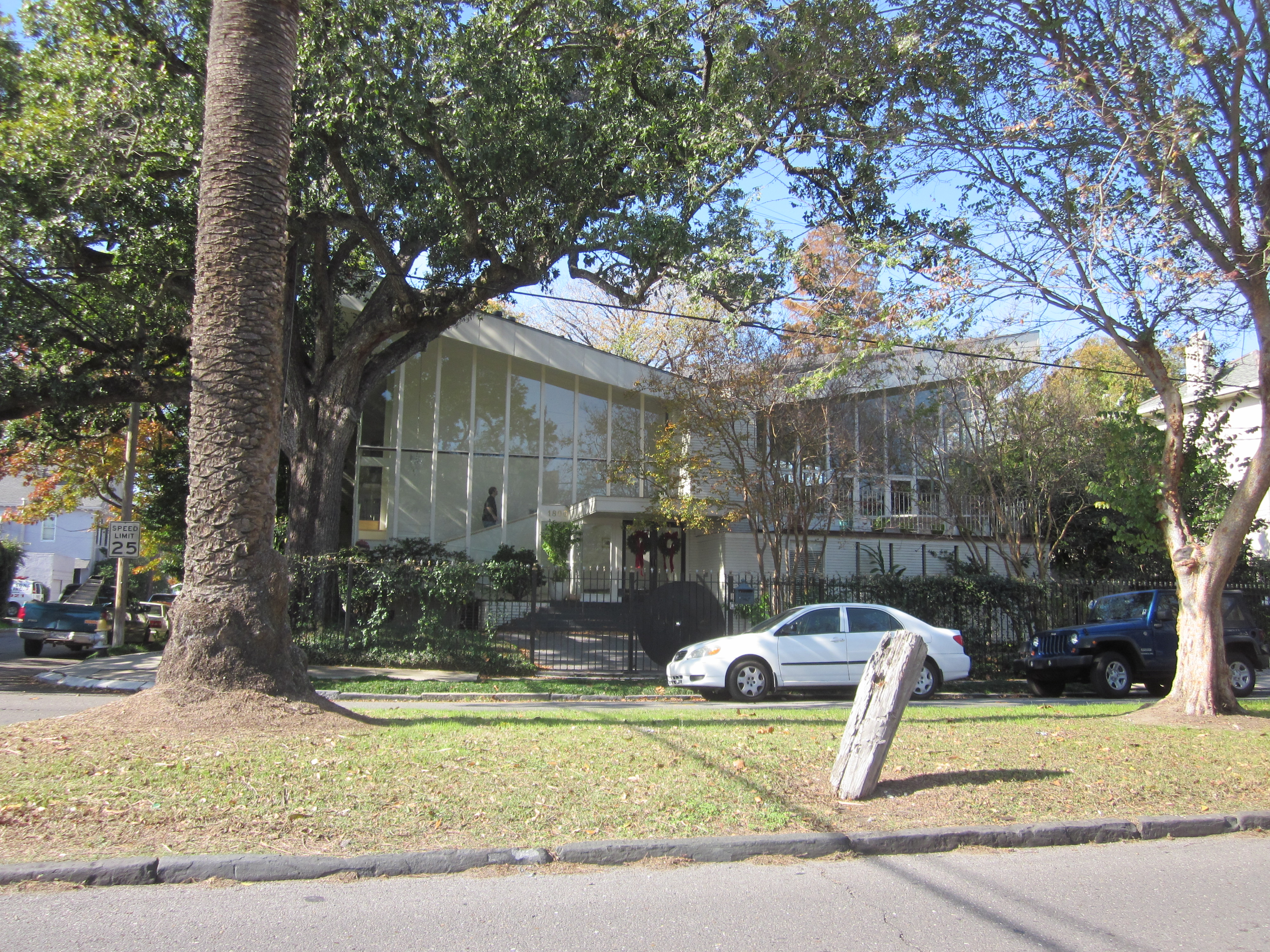
Unitarian Church on Jefferson Avenue in New Orleans (completed in 1958; converted to a residence following relocation of the church)
