= National American Bank Building =

- U.S. National Register of Historic Places
- U.S. Historic district – Contributing property
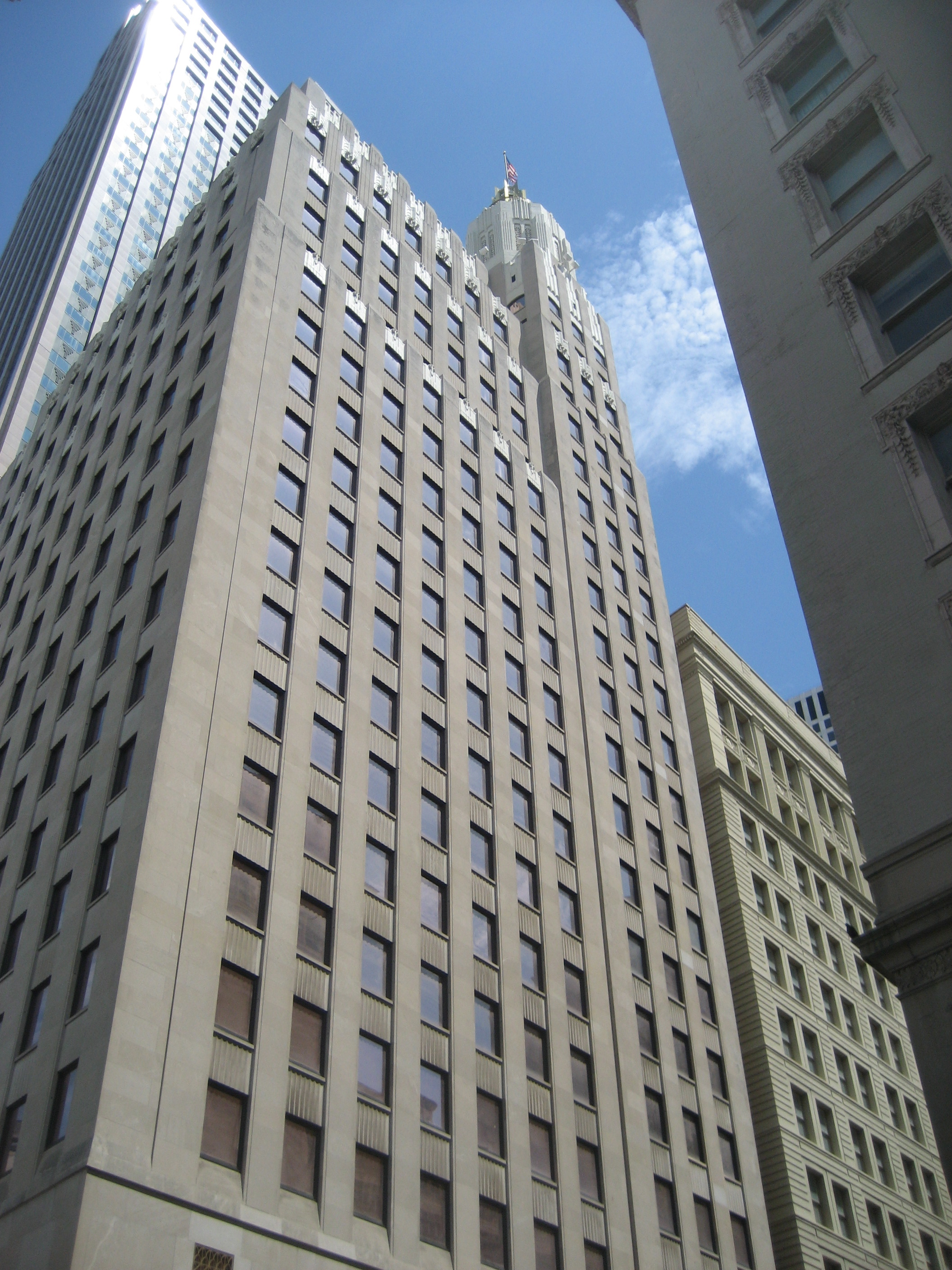
- West facade 2009

- Location within East New Orleans Location within Louisiana Location within the United States
- Location: 200 Carondelet Street, New Orleans, Louisiana
- Coordinates: 29°57′8″N 90°4′14″W
- Area: 0.3 acres (0.12 ha)
- Built: 1929
- Architect: Moise H. Goldstein Sr.
- Architectural style: Gothic, Modernistic
- Part of: New Orleans Lower Central Business District (ID91000825)
- NRHP reference No.: 86001048

Significant dates
- Added to NRHP: May 15, 1986
- Designated CP: June 24, 1991

National American Bank Building is a 23-story 325 feet (99 m)-tall skyscraper in the Central Business District of New Orleans, Louisiana, It was completed in 1929 and listed on the National Register of Historic Places in 1986. It is topped with a distinctive 6-story octagonal tower with a golden Art Deco finial. Its address is 200 Carondelet Street. Originally a commercial building, it was renovated for use as a residential building after Hurricane Katrina.

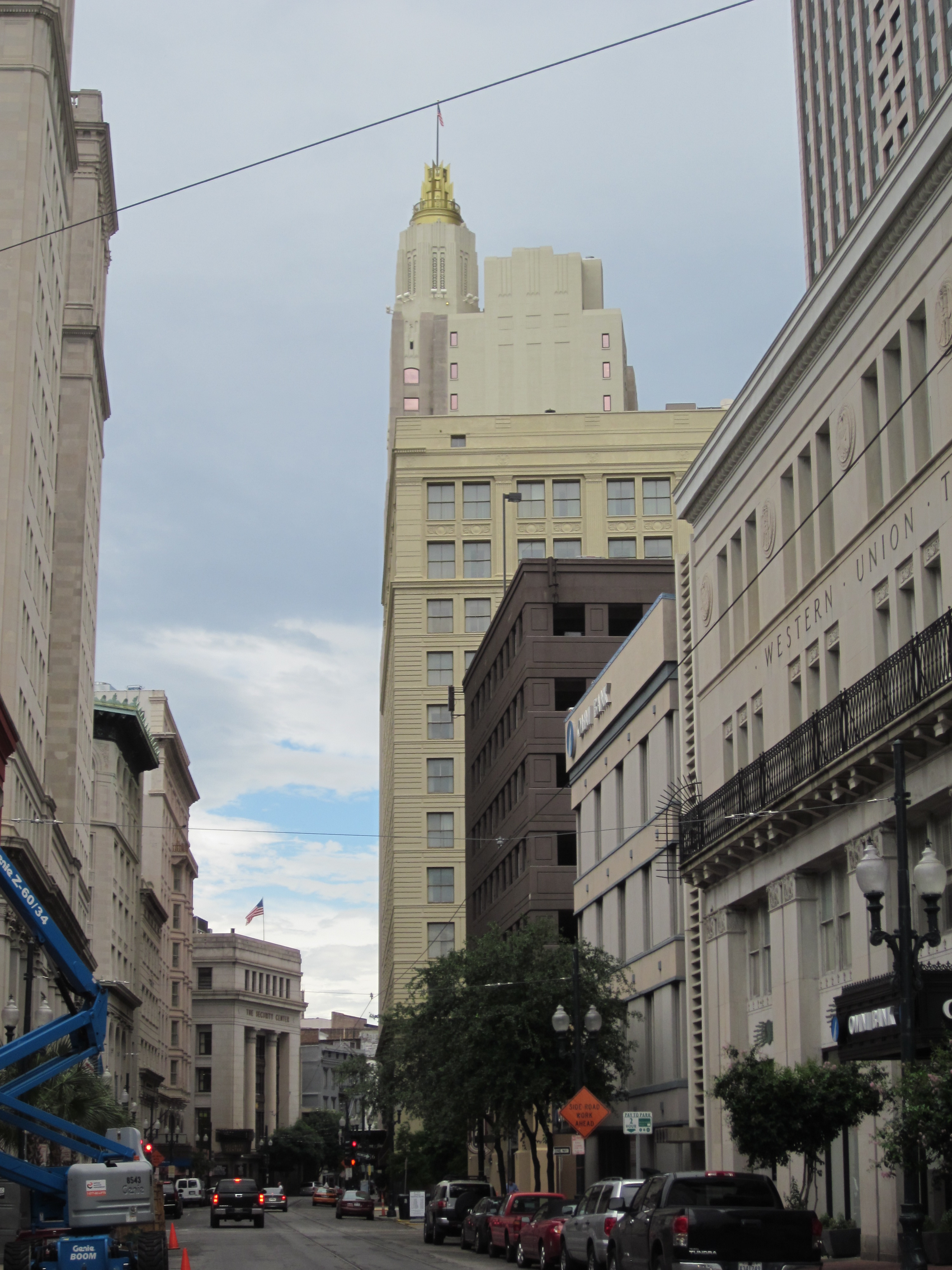
Art Deco finial atop National American Bank Building in 2009

== Description ==
The building was constructed from 1928 to 1929, under the direction of Louisiana architect Moise Goldstein; the general contractor was George J. Glover Company. Construction consisted of a steel skeleton, concrete, and hollow tiles. Bricks were used for common walls. The base of the building was faced with polished granite, and a limestone facade was used on the upper floors. On top of the 23rd floor is a 6-story octagonal tower, covered by an ornamental finial. The building was the first in New Orleans to utilize indoor air-conditioning within a public space.

In the late 1980s, when the building was assessed for National Register listing, the interior lobby area was marble clad, and the ceiling was described as, "gold and silver leaf pressed metal with a repeating chevron and diamond point pattern". Columns supported the banking hall roof, and bronze was used for elevator doors, panels, and check stations. The banking hall also retained its original chandeliers, and walnut paneling on the walls.

== History ==
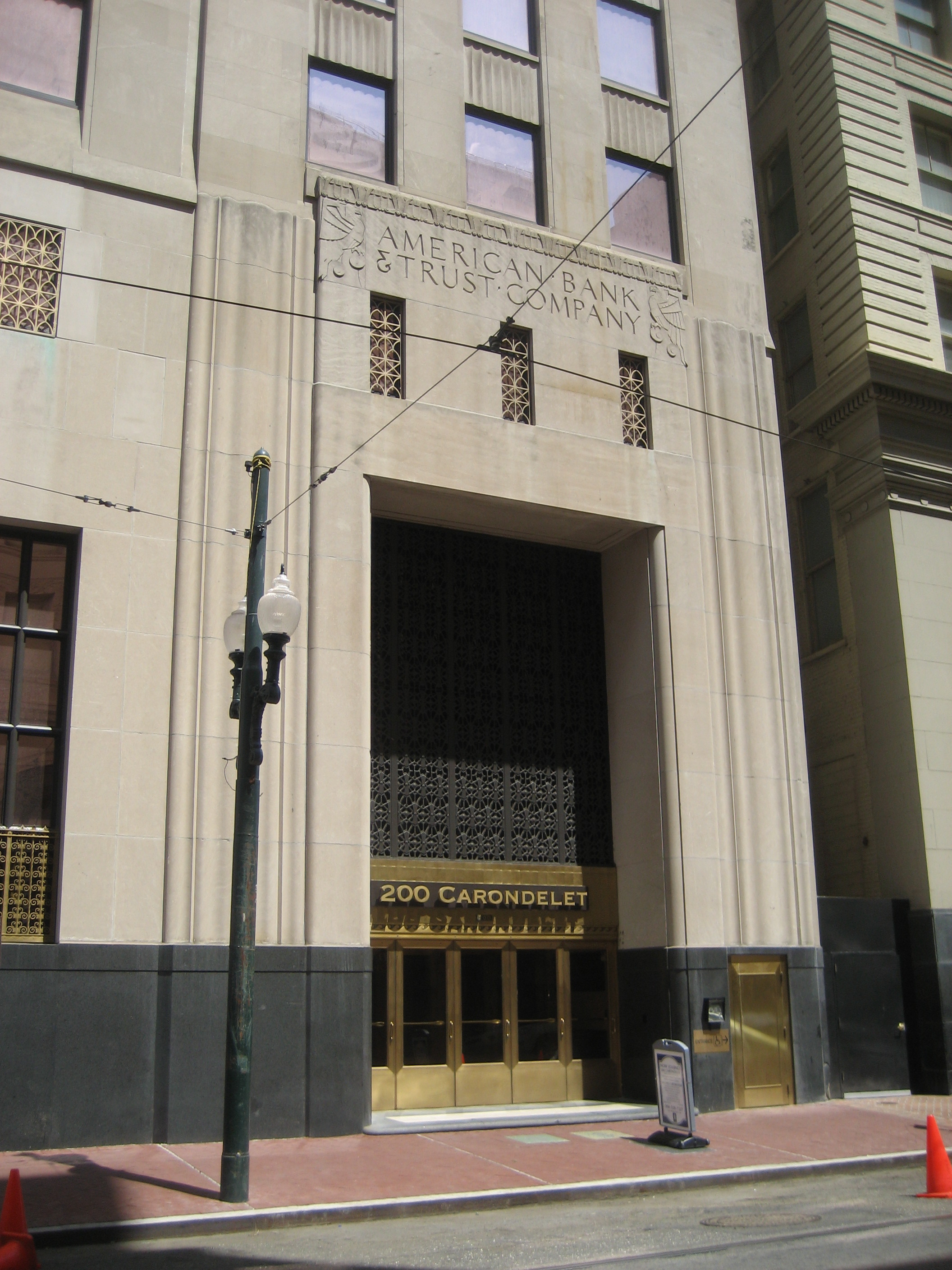
Entrance to "200 Carondelet" in 2009

During peak occupation of the building in the 20th century, banks utilized the ground floor and mezzanine, while law firms and other businesses occupied the upper floors. By 2000, the building was vacant. In the aftermath of Hurricane Katrina, renovation opportunities arose to replace thousands of rental units lost in the storm. Renovation of the structure was completed in 2008, using public and private investment to convert the building into mixed income residential apartments, under the name "200 Carondelet".

It was included as a contributing building in the National Register listing of the New Orleans Lower Central Business District in 1991.

== See also ==
- List of tallest buildings in New Orleans
