= Moise H. Goldstein Sr. =

American architect (1882–1972)

- Born: September 17, 1882; New Orleans, Louisiana
- Died: December 28, 1972 (aged 90); New Orleans, Louisiana
- Occupation: Architect
- Parent(s): Father: Julius Goldstein; Mother: Julie Schwartz Goldstein

Moise Herbert Goldstein Sr. (September 17, 1882 − December 28, 1972) was an architect in Louisiana during the first half of the 20th century whose work includes hotels, a 23-story bank building, government buildings, airport terminal, the main library building, and a synagogue. In 1936, he was elected to Fellowship status in the American Institute of Architects and was elevated to Member Emeritus in 1961. Goldstein was a founding member of the Louisiana Architect's Association and was an active participant in establishing the School of Architecture at Tulane University.

== Biography ==
=== Education ===
After attending public schools in New Orleans, Goldstein obtained a Bachelor of Engineering degree from Tulane University in 1902. By 1905, he had earned an MS degree from Massachusetts Institute of Technology. In 1906, Goldstein attended the American Academy in Rome, devoting a year of study in France, Italy, and Turkey.

=== Career ===
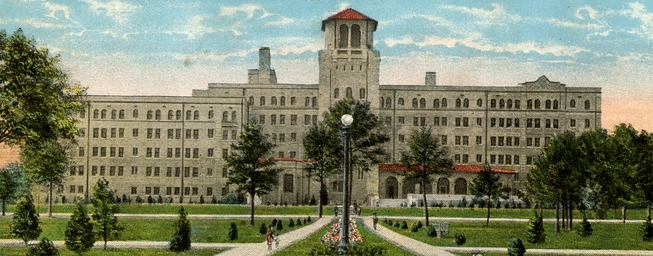
Pine Hills Hotel, circa 1930

After returning to New Orleans, Goldstein joined the architectural firm of Diboll, Owen, and Goldstein, but in 1914, he established his own company. It was during this time that he designed the Pine Hills Hotel in Bay St. Louis, Mississippi, as well as, the American Bank building and Temple Sinai in New Orleans. In the 1930s, Goldstein designed the original buildings for Dillard University, and served as campus architect from 1934 through 1961.

From 1929 to 1946, Goldstein served on the Audubon Park Commission and was active in construction projects at Audubon Zoo. During the Great Depression, Goldstein drafted designs and prepared blueprints for new construction at the zoo, to take advantage of WPA labor and New Deal funding.

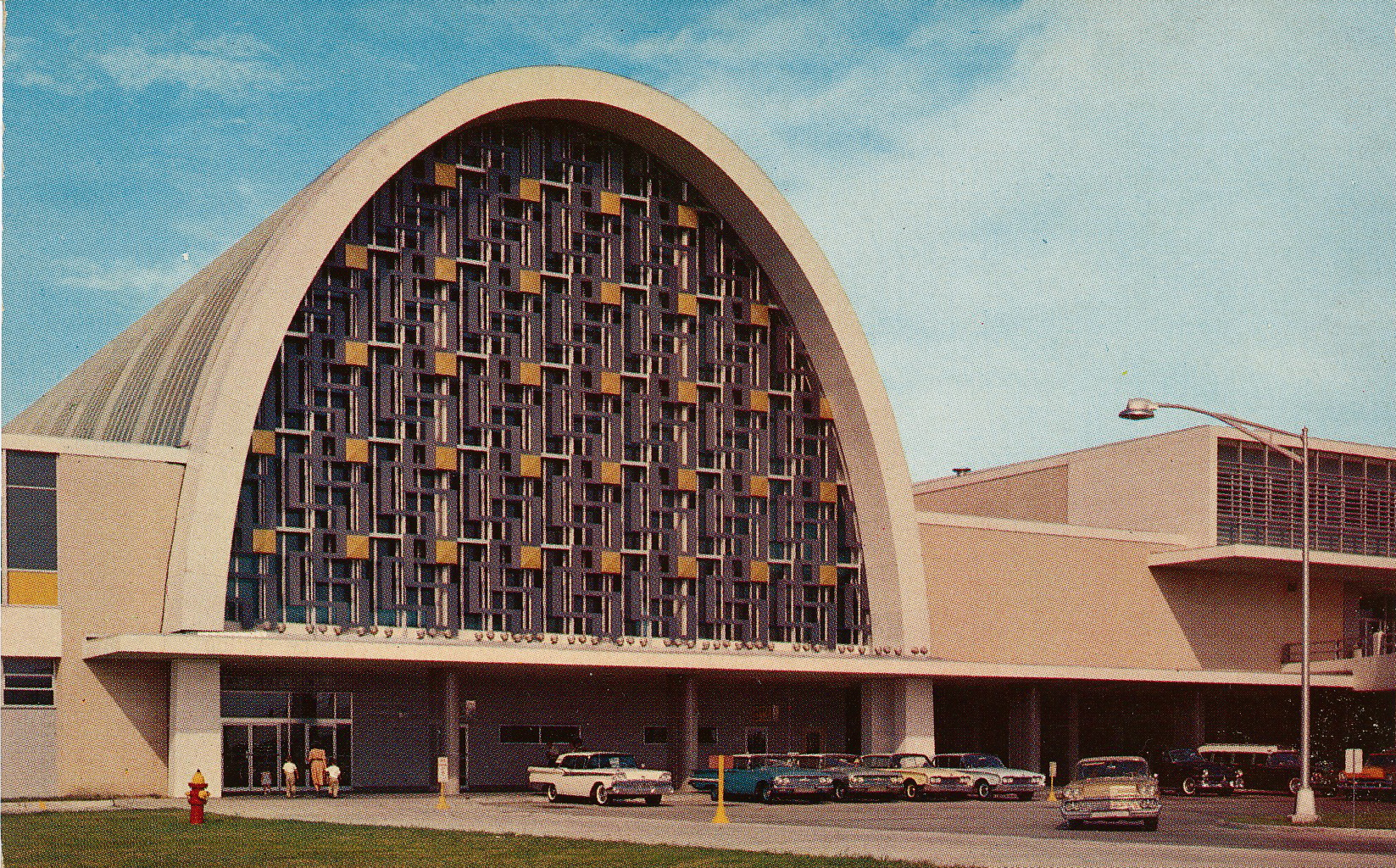
New Orleans (Moisant) International Airport terminal in the 1960s

In 1947, two architects joined Goldstein as partners, and the new architectural firm became Goldstein, Parham, and Labouisse. Through the 1950s, the firm's designs included an elementary school, a state office building, the main branch of the New Orleans Public Library, a court building, and the Moisant Airport terminal, which became Louis Armstrong International Airport.

In 1962, Goldstein ended his partnership with Parham, and Labouisse, and entered into practice with his son, forming Moise H. Goldstein; Louis A. Goldstein, architects, but the elder Goldstein retired in 1963.

=== Death ===
Moise Goldstein died December 28, 1972, and was interred at Metairie Cemetery, New Orleans, Louisiana.

== Work ==
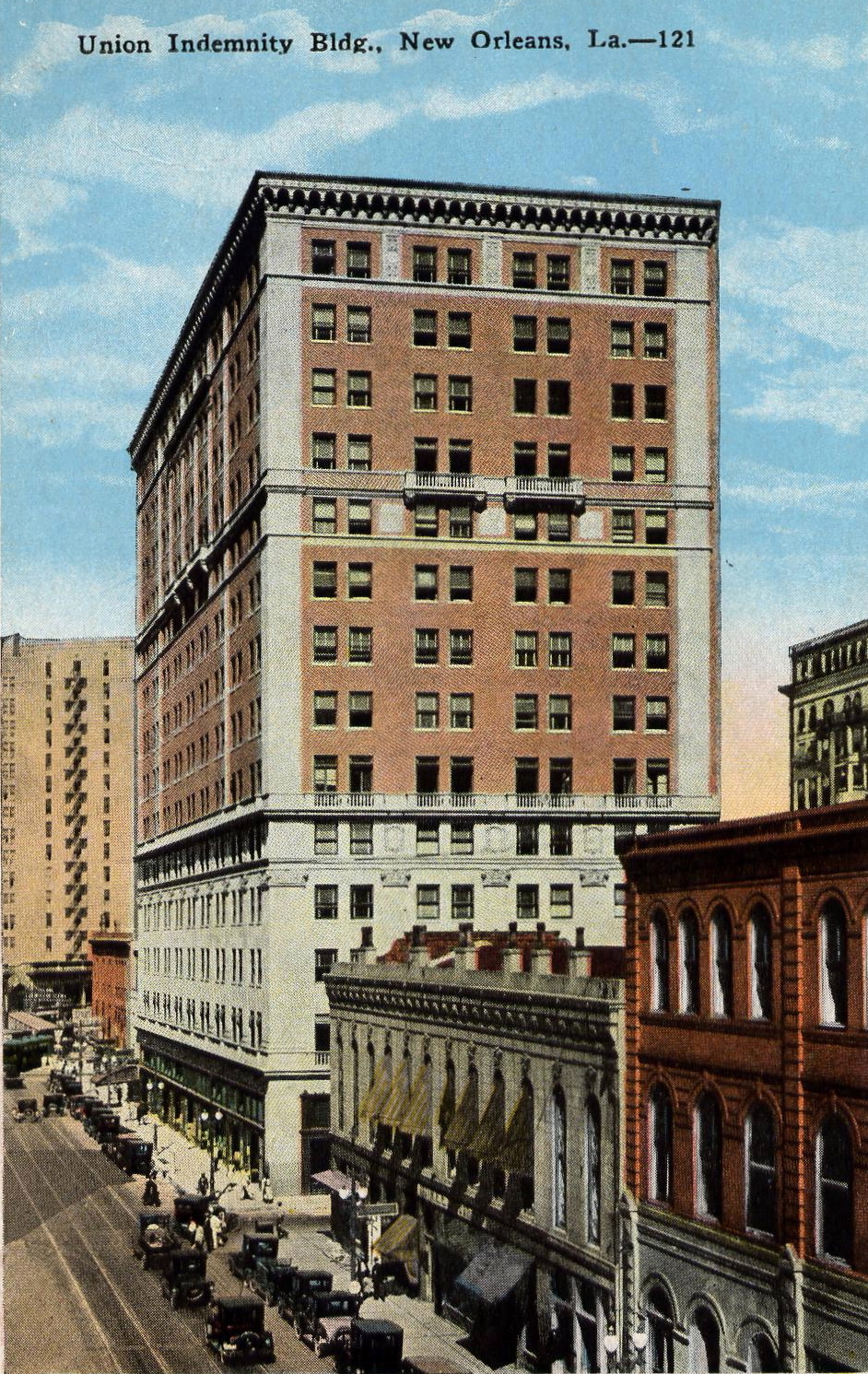
The Union Indemnity building at 837 Gravier Street, (1924)

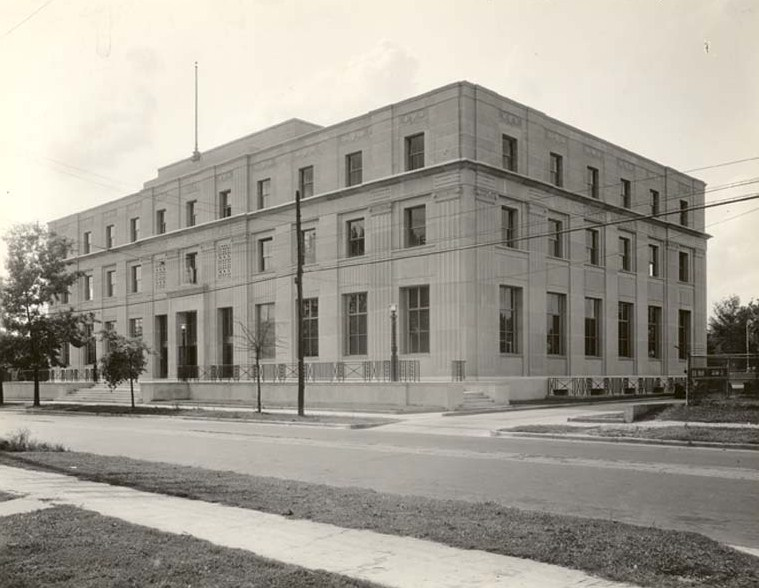
U.S. Post Office and Court House in East Baton Rouge Parish, Louisiana (1933), designed by Goldstein and in use by U.S. Bankruptcy Court for the Middle District of Louisiana

- Union Indemnity building at 837 Gravier Street (1924), designed by Goldstein with Favrot and Livaudais, architects. Now Gravier Place Apartments
- Pine Hills Hotel in Bay St. Louis, Mississippi

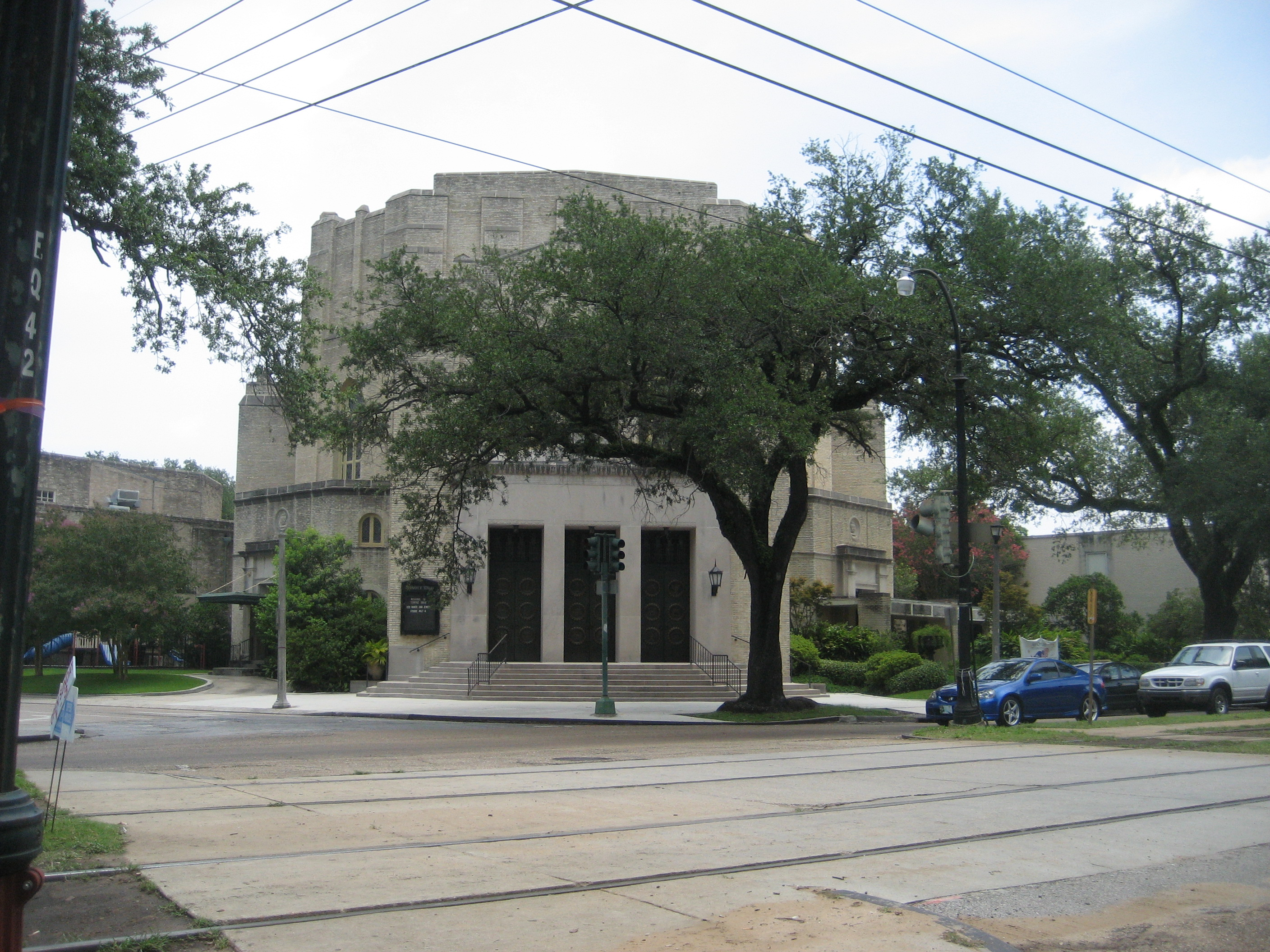
Temple Sinai

- National American Bank Building in New Orleans
- Temple Sinai (1928) on St. Charles Avenue in New Orleans
- Original buildings for Dillard University
- Main branch New Orleans Public Library
- Moisant Airport terminal
