= Kenneth A. Schwartz =

American architect

Kenneth A. Schwartz, FAIA is an architect, community designer, planner, and educator based in New Orleans, LA. He is a Favrot Professor and former Dean of the Tulane School of Architecture.

Schwartz received a Bachelor of Architecture (1979) and Master of Architecture and Urban Design (1983) from Cornell University. He arrived at the University of Virginia School of Architecture in 1984 after teaching for several years at Cornell and Syracuse University. He also served as a visiting assistant professor at Princeton University from 1986 to 1987.

During his twenty-four years at the University of Virginia School of Architecture, Schwartz served as professor, department chair, and associate dean. From 2005 to 2008, he served as a leader of the university's Faculty Senate, including a year as chair and committee member on the Board of Visitors, the university's governing body. In 2003, he was awarded UVa's Alumni Association Distinguished Professor Award, the school's highest university-wide teaching honor. He was elected to the fellowship of the American Institute of Architects in 2001.

Schwartz's professional work has focused on the constructive force that progressive urbanism and architecture can play in rebuilding cities. His work with Schwartz-Kinnard, Architects, a company he formed with his wife Judith Kinnard, won four national design competitions focusing on these issues. He founded the community design office of Renaissance Planning Group, a cross-disciplinary firm based in Orlando, Florida and won a Charter Award from the Congress for the New Urbanism for one of his master plans with this firm. In 2005, he formed his independent firm, Community Planning + Design, as an outgrowth of this work, focusing on Virginia projects.

In 2008 he was appointed as dean of the Tulane School of Architecture. In 2009 he was identified as one of the twenty-five leading architectural educators in the United States by Design Intelligence Magazine.
