= Tulane University School of Architecture and Built Environment =

Architecture school of Tulane University

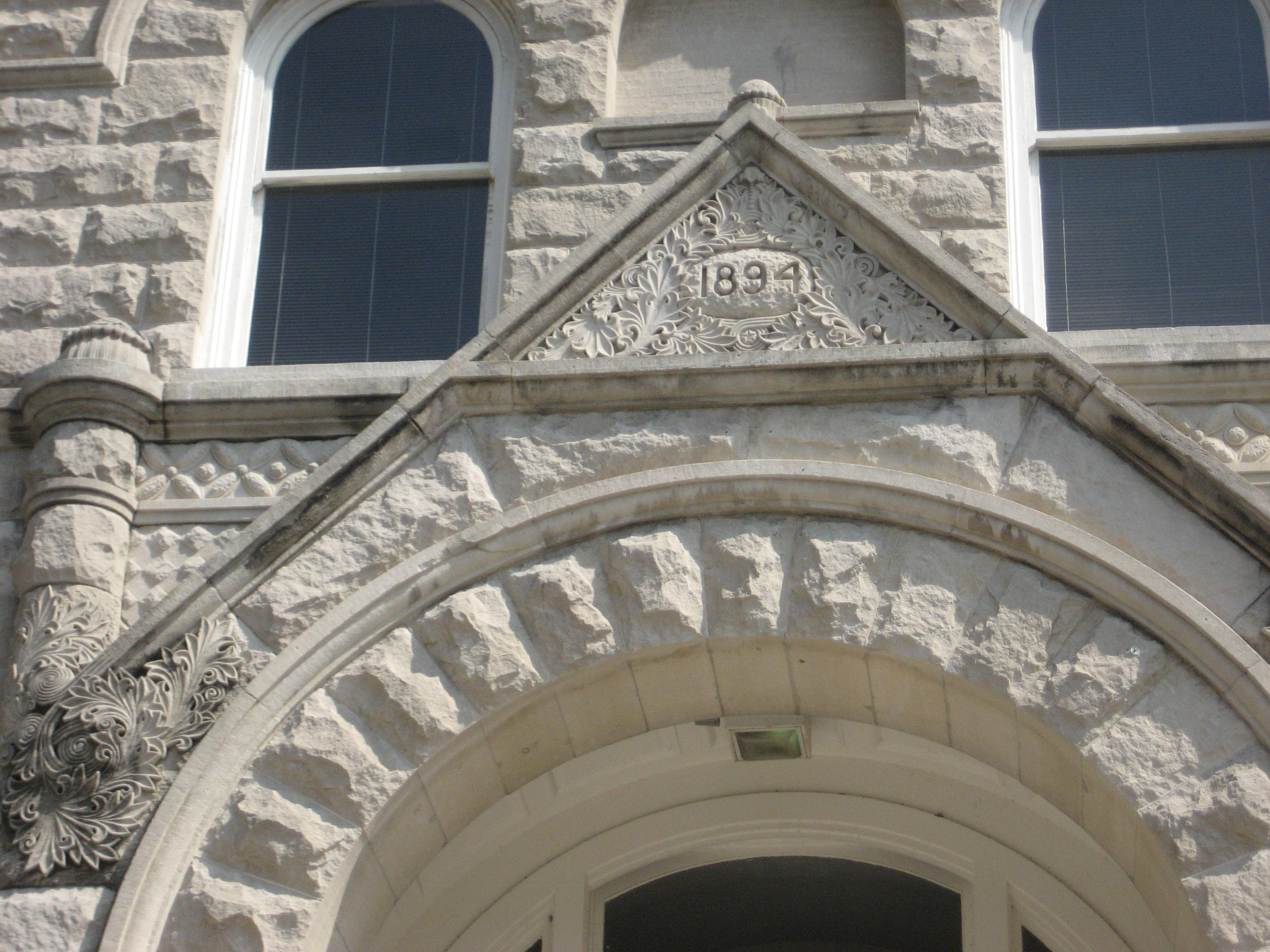
- Type: Private
- Established: 1894
- Affiliations: NAAB, AIAS, ACSA
- Dean: Iñaki Alday
- Faculty: 90 faculty
- Undergraduates: 365
- Postgraduates: 77
- Location: New Orleans, Louisiana, United States; 29.9356°N 90.1218°W
- Campus: Urban
- Website: architecture.tulane.edu

The Tulane University School of Architecture and Built Environment is the architecture school at Tulane University in New Orleans, Louisiana.

== History ==
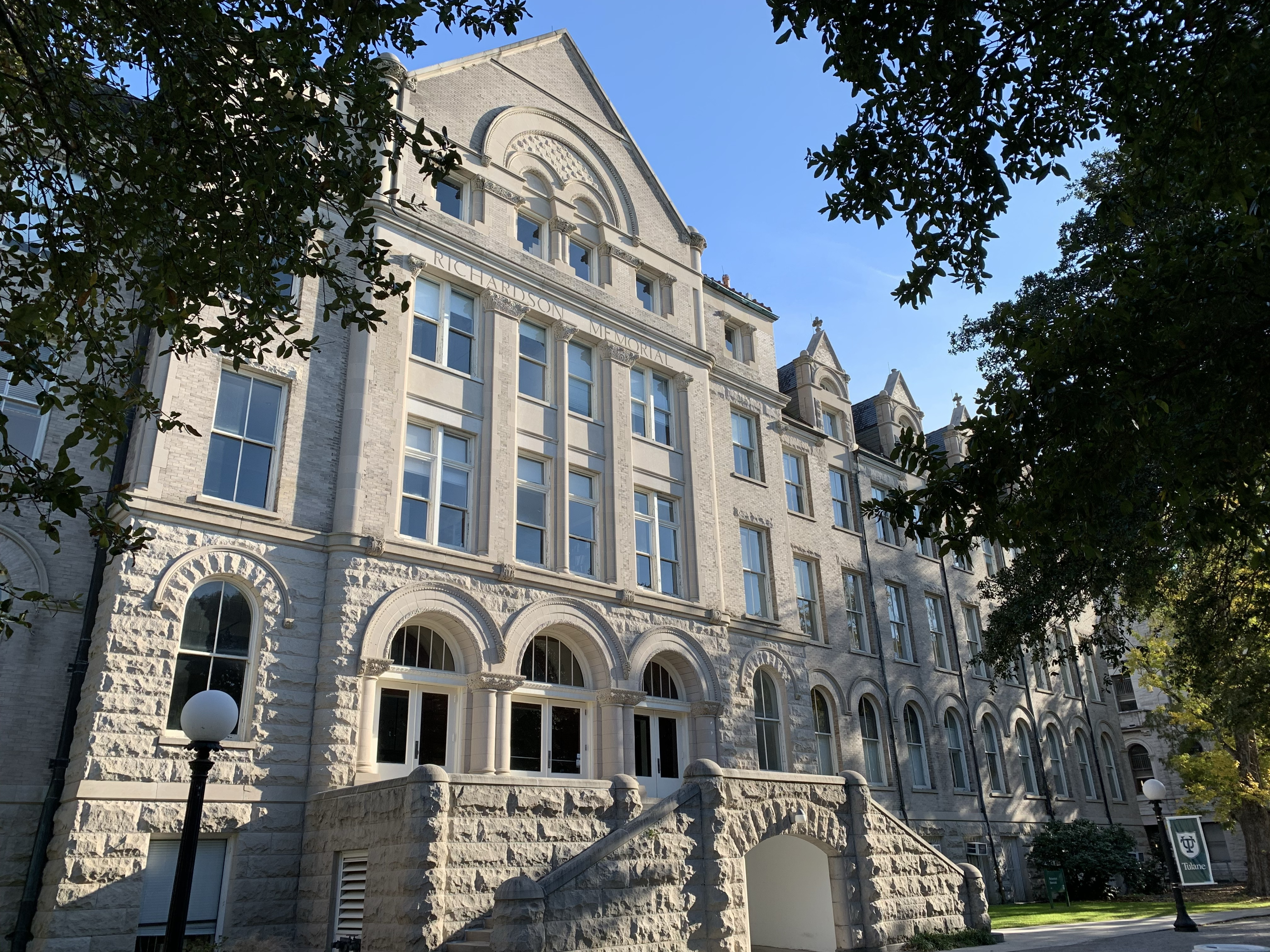
Richardson Memorial Hall, houses the School of Architecture

In 1894, Tulane University offered the first courses in architecture leading to a degree in architectural engineering under professor William Woodward. At this time, only about a dozen schools of architecture had been established in the United States. A full four-year professional curriculum in architecture, leading to the bachelor's degree, was established in the College of Technology (Engineering) in the 1907–1908 academic year. In 1912, Professor Nathaniel Cortlandt Curtis was appointed head of the newly independent Architecture Department; his successors were Professor John Herndon Thompson in 1921 and Professor Buford L. Pickens in 1946.

At the conclusion of the Second World War, the faculty and enrollment increased to accommodate returning veterans. The school continued to grow throughout the next two decades. John Ekin Dinwiddie was appointed dean of the School of Architecture in 1953; Professor John William Lawrence succeeded him in 1960. In 1971, the School of Architecture renovated and moved into its present facility, the Richardson Memorial Building, and experienced another increase in enrollment that continued throughout the 1970s. Professor William Kay Turner became the dean in 1972, and in 1975 a small graduate program was initiated, offering a course of study leading to the Master of Architecture II as a second professional degree. In 1981, after beginning his service as dean the previous year, Professor Ronald Coulter Filson established the Architectural Coalition for professional research and practice by faculty and students. Professor Donna V. Robertson succeeded Dean Filson in 1992. Upon the resignation of Dean Robertson in 1996, Professor Donald F. Gatzke was appointed acting dean. After a year-long search, Dean Gatzke was appointed dean in 1997. In October 2004 Reed Kroloff was appointed dean of the School after the departure of Dean Gatzke. Dean Emeritus Filson served as interim dean during the search.

In the summer of 1990, the School began a program offering a Master of Architecture I (now named Master of Architecture) as a first professional degree for students with undergraduate degrees in other disciplines. The program awarded its first degrees in 1993 and was granted accreditation in 1994. In the fall of 1997, the School initiated a Masters in Preservation Studies Program (now named Master of Science in Historic Preservation) with a first-time enrollment of ten students. Also in 1997, a supplemental Certificate in Preservation Studies was offered to undergraduates for the first time. The School began in 1999 offering a five-year Master of Architecture (now named Bachelor of Architecture) to students who have not earned a bachelor's degree. In 2019, the School of Architecture teamed up with Tulane's A.B. Freeman School of Business to launch a dual degree program where graduate students simultaneously earn the Master of Business Administration (MBA) and the Master of Sustainable Real Estate Development (MSRED), the first and only such pairing in the nation.

== Notable alumni ==
- Nathaniel Cortlandt Curtis Jr. and Arthur Quentin Davis, of the firm Curtis & Davis, architects of Louisiana Superdome, Embassy of the United States in Saigon, South Vietnam.
- Robert Ivy, Chief Executive Officer of the American Institute of Architects
- A. Hays Town, architect
- Samuel Wilson, Jr., preservation architect
- Bernard Lemann, architectural historian
- Albert C. Ledner, architect
- Moise H. Goldstein Sr., architect
- Wellington "Duke" Reiter, AR '81, president, School of the Art Institute of Chicago
- Jing Liu, architect, co-founder of the award-winning design firm SO – IL

== Notable faculty ==
- Iñaki Alday, Dean and Richard Koch Chair of Architecture; Founder of Alday Jover arquitectura y paisaje; advisor to the United Nations as an expert on the urban planning of rivers and deltas
- Errol Barron, of the firm Barron + Toups, architects of the Ogden Museum of Southern Art
- Richard Campanella, author, geographer, definitive researcher on New Orleans historic geographic and urban landscape
- Charles R. Colbert, architect of the Phillis Wheatley Elementary School, New Orleans
- Ammar Eloueini, architect, creator of unique chair design, CoReFab#116, that is in the permanent collection of the Museum of Modern Art in New York City
- Jesse Keenan, one of the United States' leading scholars on climate change and the built environment
- Ronald Filson, FAIA, architect of the renovation of the Piazza d'Italia
- Reed Kroloff, former dean, former editor of Architecture magazine
- Kenneth A. Schwartz, FAIA, former dean (2008–2018), current Professor of Architecture, Michael Sacks Chair in Civic Engagement and Social Entrepreneurship, Director of Phyllis Taylor Center for Social Innovation and Design Thinking
- Judith Kinnard, FAIA, former President-elect NAAB and past president of ACSA

== Lectures, events and honors ==
=== The John W. Lawrence Memorial Lecture ===
Each year an architect or scholar is invited to the School of Architecture to deliver a special lecture in honor of its late Dean, John W. Lawrence. Lawrence lecturers have included Louis I. Kahn, Charles Willard Moore, Arata Isozaki, Mario Gandelsonas, Peter Eisenman, Rem Koolhaas, Bernard Tschumi, and Greg Lynn.

=== Other Activities ===
The School also sponsors and supports traveling fellowships for students, such as the Lawrence, Class of 1973 and Goldstein Fellowships. The Architecture Student Government organizes an annual all-school Design Symposium, inviting guest lectures and hosting workshops. The school's student-run publication The Charrette won a 2020 Center for Architecture Haskell Award for Student Journals.

== See also ==
- Kenneth A. Schwartz
