= Buccaneer Yacht Club =

Sailing club in Mobile Bay, Alabama, United States

- Burgee
- Short name: BucYC
- Founded: 1849
- Location: 4381 Park Rd, Mobile, Alabama 36605 United States
- Website: bucyc.com

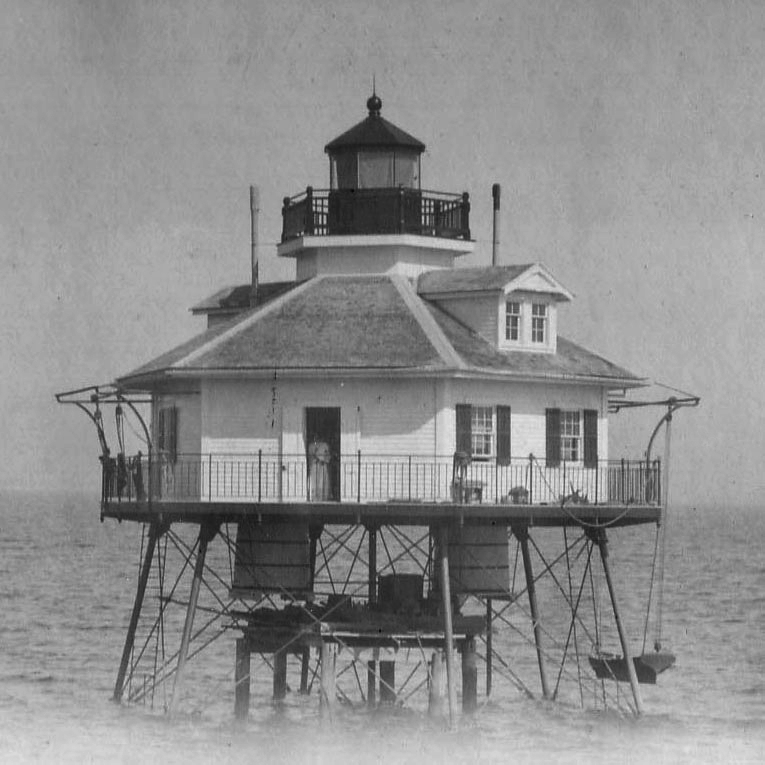
Middle Bay Light, prominent marker for Mobile Bay sailing races

Buccaneer Yacht Club (abbreviated formally as BucYC or in local tradition as BYC) is a member-run sailing club which has operated out of Mobile Bay, Alabama since 1928. It is a member club of the Gulf Yachting Association and the United States Sailing Association. Its members are active competitors in Finn, Viper 640, 420, Fish class sloop, Flying Scot, Laser, Optimist, Sunfish, PHRF and Portsmouth class events. While the Mobile Yacht Club predates it, BucYC remains arguably the oldest continuously operating sailing club in Alabama.

== Races and fleets ==
As one of four sailing clubs on Mobile Bay, BucYC hosts the Dauphin Island Race once every three years. This is "arguably the largest single day point to point sail race in the U.S.A." with over 300 boats and 1000 crewmembers. In 2007 it hosted the 87th annual Sir Thomas Lipton Inter-Club Challenge sailboat race, an Olympic style GYA racing event for sailors of Flying Scot dinghies.

BucYC members maintain the largest surviving fleet of Fish class sailboats in the world and the club hosts the majority of races for this class. Fish boats were designed in 1919 and were the original Gulf Yachting Association inter-club racing boat until they were replaced by Flying Scots in 1969. They "...incorporated features of the New England Sharpie and some of the Biloxi Cat--the straight lines and chine of the Sharpie, the wide beam and low free-board of the Cat..." as well as a vee bottom, lead keel and gaff rigged sail.

The club is one of over forty nationwide hosts of the Leukemia Cup Regatta, a major fund raising event organized by the Leukemia & Lymphoma Society to raise donations for medical research into the causes and treatment of leukemia, lymphoma, Hodgkin's disease and myeloma.

== Sailors ==
Its notable members include Sunfish sailor, Karl Kleinschrodt, who won fourth place among international contenders in the 2007 Sunfish North American championship race. Karl's mother, Amy Champman Kleinschrodt, has won the coveted Adams Cup 4 times, in 1977, 1980, 1997, and 2009. Another member, Donnie Brennen, (also a member of New Orleans Yacht Club) has been named as boatwright for the 2008 U. S. Olympic sailing team.

== Intercollegiate sailing ==
In the interest of providing sailing education and race training BucYC is the sponsoring club for the University of South Alabama Sailing Club, which competes in intercollegiate races against teams such as those from Oklahoma State University, Texas A&M University and Tulane University.
