= BYC =

BYC may mean:

- Baloch Yakjehti Committee, a human rights movement in Balochistan, Pakistan
- Backyard cricket
- Balboa Yacht Club
- Barrack Young Controllers FC, an association football club in Monrovia, Liberia
- Balatonfüredi Yacht Club of Balatonfüred, Hungary
- Base Year Compensation, a type of player in NBA, see NBA Salary Cap
- Bayview Yacht Club of Detroit, Michigan
- Biloxi Yacht Club of Biloxi, Mississippi
- Brachyspina carrier, a calf tested positive for having brachyspina syndrome (a genetic abnormality in the Holstein Friesian cattle breed); those tested negative are designated as BYF (brachyspina-free)
- British Youth Council
- Broken Yolk Cafe
- Buccaneer Yacht Club (Alabama)
- BYC, a Bikram Yoga company
