= Biloxi Yacht Club =

- Burgee
- Short name: BYC
- Founded: 1849
- Location: 124 Lameuse St., Biloxi, Mississippi, United States
- Website: www.biloxiyachtclub.org

The Biloxi Yacht Club (BYC) is located in Biloxi, Mississippi, United States, on the shores of the Mississippi Sound. The BYC is a founding member of the Gulf Yachting Association, as well as the Mississippi Coast Yachting Association.

== Club history ==
While it was previously thought the Biloxi Yacht Club was established in 1888, additional research undertaken by the Club in 2000 revealed a much earlier date, at least 1849. From the Biloxi Yacht Club resolution:

The New Orleans papers discussed the Race of 1849 and subsequent races of the period, going into great detail about the Race of 1849, since the Biloxi Regatta Club, in a precursor to today's rivalry between Gulf of Mexico and Lake Pontchartrain racing circuits, was excluding from its regatta any boat that won two first place finishes, thus unfairly eliminating what the Lake folks thought were the leading boats of the time.
On August 8, 1849, the Race of 1849 was held by the Biloxi Regatta Club with Undine of Mobile, Alabama, owned by the Honorable J. W. Lescene, taking a first, and Mary Ann, owned by James & Co., taking a second, and Biloxi's own Flirt, owned by A. B. Cammack coming in third, so that by that date it is certain that what has become known in modern times as the Biloxi Yacht Club, was already in existence.

The mid-19th century was remembered also as the organizational time for Gulf sailing activities. With many families along the coast owning yachts—a vessel with sails, emphasized a Down South magazine story in its May–June, 1976, issue — a group of men met in Pass Christian in 1849 and formed the Southern Yacht Club Association. A clubhouse was erected that same year at West End on Lake Pontchartrain. Southern Yacht Club at once gave sailing the impetus it needed. Soon, members were sailing their yachts from New Orleans to Point Clear, Alabama, Eastern Shore Yacht Club, and also organized races between these points. As Biloxi was a thriving city midway between Mobile and New Orleans, its importance in yachting history was assured. The seafood cannery owners saw in the visitors' regattas a means of using their large fleets of schooners during the off season. Their fasted boats were finely tuned and raced, leading to a regular weekend schedule of races through the months of July and August.

The following description of the clubhouse is from an early account found in a booklet given to the Biloxi Library by the late Jacinto Baltar, a prominent businessman, banker and civic leader.

The clubhouse is built on a foundation set in 10 feet of water directly opposite the Montross Hotel. A long pier connects the clubhouse with the shore. The building consists of four stories. On a level with the pier are the bathhouses and on either side of them are galleries with stairways leading down into the water. The second floor is reached by a stairway on the outside of the building, leading up directly from the end of the pier. Entering the hall, facing South, the reading room is on the left and the handsome ladies' parlors on the right. Directly behind these rooms and extending the full with of the building is the lounging room. The furniture is handsome in design and finish and lends an air of attractiveness to the apartment. The ladies' parlors are cozy laces, and are provided with every convenience. Behind the lounging room is a broad, long gallery, which accommodates 500 observers. From it one has a full view of the club's 15-mile course in the Mississippi Sound. The 3rd floor (when finished) will be devoted to billiard rooms and the 4th story, reached by a winding stair, is the observation tower. From it the Judges with the aid of glasses have a full sweep of the Sound and can easily follow the movements of the yachts.

Biloxi Yacht Club, built 1916, destroyed by Hurricane Camille in 1969

At last, there were serene years ahead for BYC. But it was only the calm before the storm. The eye of a hurricane passed over the club in 1915, leaving only splintered pilings and a reminder of the once-lavish yachting showplace. Again, in July 1916, a hurricane brushed the club, but the new edifice, built just east of the old clubhouse with similar lines, stood tall. Saved, for the most part, was BYC's $3,500 clubhouse investment! "The only loss," Quave reported, "was loose lumber and tools amounting to $250".

A charter member of the Southern Gulf Coast Yachting Association on April 28, 1901, along with Bay Waveland, Mobile, Southern and Pass Christian, BYC found itself cast in that role again in 1920. As competition increased first among neighboring and then more distant clubs, pressure built to organize for the purpose of scheduling regattas the breadth of the Gulf Coast. In 1920 the Gulf Yachting Association was born. It also was proposed that a boat be designed and adopted by each club for club competition in order for all to compete evenly. A 21-foot (6.4 m) gaff-rigged keel sloop was the result, designed by Commodore J. Rathbone deBuys of Southern Yacht Club and to be known as a "Fish Boat". The popular sloop remained the official competitive boat of the GYA until 1967 when high maintenance and replacement costs nudged member clubs into retiring the "Fish Class" in favor of a fiberglass equivalent. Eventually, after much heated debate between Fish Class sentimentalists and those proffering what they claimed was a more practical solution, the Flying Scot was accepted as the new GYA standard bearer.

It was not until 1969, however, that Biloxians would fully appreciate a hurricane. That was the year the BYC elected to renovate the now aging facility. The story could not be told more eloquently that by the historian Murfee in her Lee Sheet column:

This is the picture of the Biloxi Yacht Club that was indelibly etched in the minds of most of the members of the old yacht club -- this building, indestructible, standing tall and undaunted after the hurricane of 1947, surrounded on all sides by the rubble of buildings that once were neighbors. It had stood the test of time, having been rebuilt after the storm of 1915 and having weathered all that Nature had flung her way since that time.

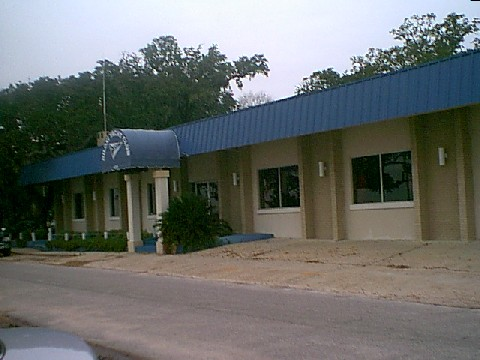
Biloxi Yacht Club, acquired 1972, destroyed by Hurricane Katrina in 2005

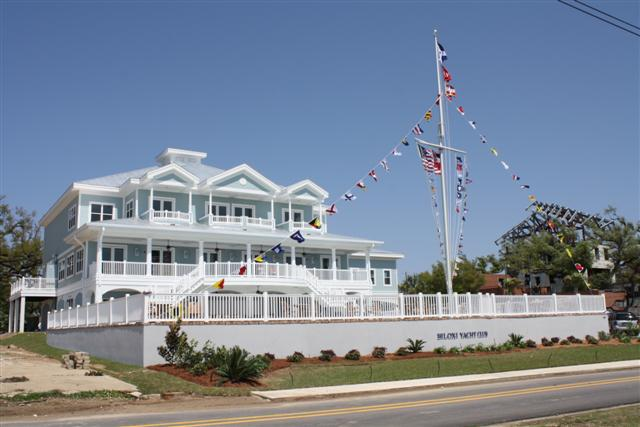
Biloxi Yacht Club, designed by Architect Walter "Buzzy" Bolton

It is small wonder that a group of energetic members were continuing their work remodeling the upper floor of the clubhouse for a gala opening that would feature and art exhibit and a fashion show in a large room suitable for meetings and other events while a storm, named Camille, was flirting along a path to the coast but until the last minute seemed to be headed for Panama City, Florida, that fateful day in August, 1969.

A different picture awaited the members on that grim morning after. The old familiar landmark was now gone forever. But the Biloxi Yacht Club would come back to life.

All the while the club stalwarts were considering their options, looking into all possibilities, and in time the El Capitan Lounge, swimming pool and marina of the Trade Winds Hotel became available. With some trepidation and much discussion, pro and con, the Biloxi Yacht Club, with an SBA 3% loan of $239,000 had a new home.

In its colorful 100-odd year history BYC has had to make many decisions. None, however, caught the community more by surprise that the action taken by the board the year of Franklin Roosevelt's visit. In their pictorial history of "Biloxi and the Mississippi Gulf Coast," Colleen and Joe Scholtes report that after due deliberations the board, "banned the turkey trot and other newfangled dances in favor of the two-step and waltz."[2]

In August, 2005, Hurricane Katrina destroyed the organizations clubhouse. A prominent local architect and long time club member Walter "Buzzy" Bolton, started the design of the new Biloxi Yacht Club and construction began in 2007. The new clubhouse opened in April 2009.

== Regattas ==
Once every 7 years the club hosts the MCYA's Chapman Regatta and the GYA/MCYA's Race Week Regatta.

GYA's Gulf Ocean Racing Circuit

The Jerry Ellis Junior Regatta

The Biloxi Invitational Regatta

The Biloxi Mayor's Cup Regatta

Wednesday Night Racing

== Sailing history ==
Organizing, reorganizing, building and rebuilding spacious club house facilities was a lot easier than establishing themselves as masters of the fine are of competitive sailing in the GYA the Biloxians were to discover. Perhaps that was because of their fiercely independent nature. "Biloxi fishermen neither know nor care anything about rules," Gerald Taylor White, famous for his America's Cup coverage, wrote in the 1926 The Rudder. "If a boat is in your way, you sail over her or through her at your own discretion." However, he added quickly, "For seamanship and snappy sail handling, we enter the Biloxi fishermen for world honors."

For 17 years BYC participated in what must have seemed an exercise in futility. Through 1936, seven clubs had figured in the win column, Pensacola, captor of the inaugural in 1920, sailing off with six Sir Thomas Jr. Lipton Interclub Challenge Series Victories. Other champions were Sarasota in 1930, 1931 and 1932, Eastern Shore, 1921, Southern Yacht Club, 1925, Mobile, 1928, and Buccaneer, 1934. In 1922 and again in 1927, Southern and Pensacola tied, and Eastern Shore and St. Petersburg wound up all even in 1926.

BYC's Junior Program, meanwhile enjoyed only brief period in the sun. After Southern's victories in the first two Junior Lipton Interclub Challenge Regattas, and a World War II-imposed four-year Series lapse, BYC's youngsters stormed back to capture the Lipton Cup in 1947, 1948 and 1949.

BYC's most notable team sailing achievement, it could be argued, came in an event to encourage the sport among women. In 1938, Commodore Bernie Knost of Pass Christian Yacht Club offered an elaborate trophy to the winner of an all-girl three-race interclub series hosted by his organization. The event was an immediate hit and has remained a highlight among Gulf sailing activities. With its large number of Skipperettes to draw from, most notable Joyce Fountain Wiltz, Janet Ferson Green, Beatrice Kennedy and Emily Joullian Dale, BYC over the years has compiled the second best record, winning the Knost nine times. Only Pass, with 11 victories, has done better. In addition to her Knost heroics, Joyce in 1949 became the first girl in the history of BYC to earn a skipper's position on the club's Lipton team.

The BYC also hosted several PHRF (Performance Handicapped Racing Fleet) events. The BYC was host to the GYA's Gulf Ocean Racing Series during the 1990s and early first decade of the 21st century, the GCYA (Gulf Coast Yachting Association) Round the Sound Series, which started at the Singing River Yacht Club (Pascagoula, MS) traveled to the Gulfport Yacht Club, and ended at the Biloxi Yacht Club. This series was transformed into the Biloxi Summer Series. The club also hosted a Leukemia Cup and the GYA Offshore Race in 2002.

Off the race course, BYC also has an impressive record. Seven of its members have held the position of Gulf Yachting Association Commodore — Dr. Eldon Bolton, Wallace Chapman, Jerry J. Ellis, Byrd Enochs, J.J. Kennedy, J.P. Moore and Walter Seymour.
