= Mississippi Coast Yachting Association =

- Burgee
- Founded: 1947
- Location: USA
- Commodore: Judy Reeves (BWYC)

The Mississippi Coast Yachting Association was organized to promote the sport of yacht racing on the Mississippi Gulf Coast and nearby areas.

== History ==
Founded in 1947, the MCYA is composed of the seven members of the Gulf Yachting Association located in the Mississippi coastal counties of Jackson, Harrison and Hancock.

== Members ==
- Bay Waveland Yacht Club
- Biloxi Yacht Club
- Gulfport Yacht Club
- Long Beach Yacht Club
- Ocean Springs Yacht Club
- Pass Christian Yacht Club
- Singing River Yacht Club

== Sailing ==
2008 Chapman Regatta

It sanctions various yachting events, including interclub competition in Flying Scots, and serves to coordinate the association activities of its member clubs. One event, the Chapman Regatta is believed to be the oldest consecutively sailed interclub Team Racing contest in the United States. The teams consist of three boats from each of the seven Mississippi Coast Yacht Clubs. The regatta consists of four races sailed in Flying Scots, which are 19-foot (5.8 m) open sailboats that carry a mainsail, jib and spinnaker. This regatta involves a significant number of sailing enthusiasts from one end of the Mississippi Coast to the other, and it annually attracts many of the best sailors on the Coast.

The organization also sponsors the Race Week Regatta which is raced in the fall at one of the member clubs (the event rotates annually) and the Great Ship Island Race.

Each year a sailor from the Mississippi Gulf Coast is chosen as the Budweiser Sailor of the Year.
