= St. Petersburg Yacht Club =

- Burgee
- Short name: SPYC
- Founded: 1909
- Location: Central Avenue, St. Petersburg, FL 33701
- Website: www.spyc.org

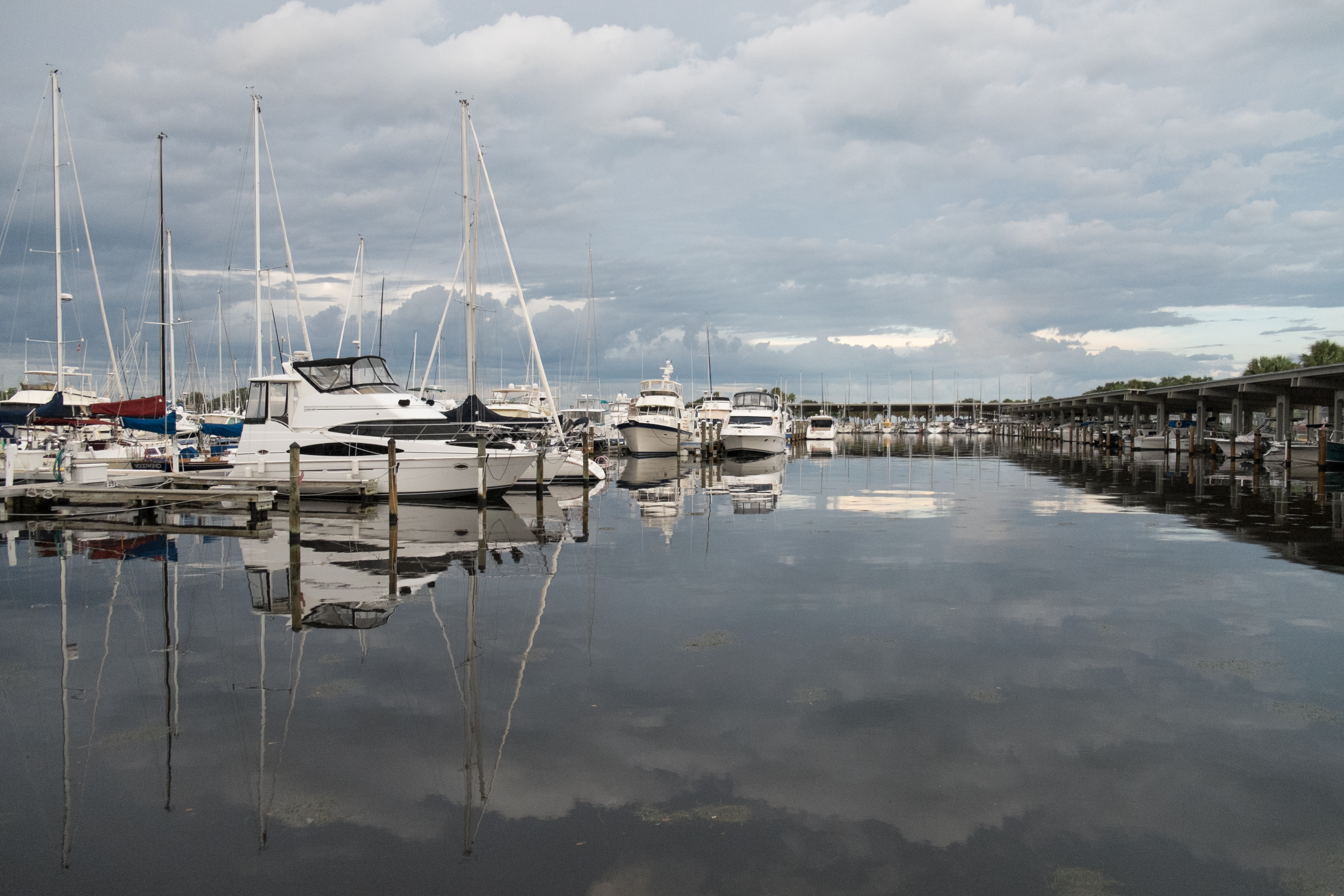
St. Petersburg Yacht Club, August 2019

The St. Petersburg Yacht Club (SPYC) is a private yacht club located in St. Petersburg, Florida (United States) and a member of the Gulf Yachting Association and the Florida Council of Yacht Clubs.

The club won the Adams Cup in 1979.

== History ==
The St. Petersburg Yacht Club was founded in 1909 and the clubhouse was inaugurated on its current site in 1917. One-Design Racing began two years later, when six Fish Class sailboats were acquired. Offshore racing started with the Havana Race in 1930 as the forerunner for the Southern Ocean Racing Conference (SORC).

== Sailors ==
Ed Baird, Allison Jolly, Mark Mendelblatt and Jennifer French are world class sailors from the SPYC.
