= DeBuys =

DeBuys is a surname. Notable people with the surname include:

- Guillaume Louis DeBuys (1798–1856), American politician
- Rathbone DeBuys (1874–1960), American architect
