= Hennen Building =

Skyscraper in New Orleans, Louisiana

The Maritime Building
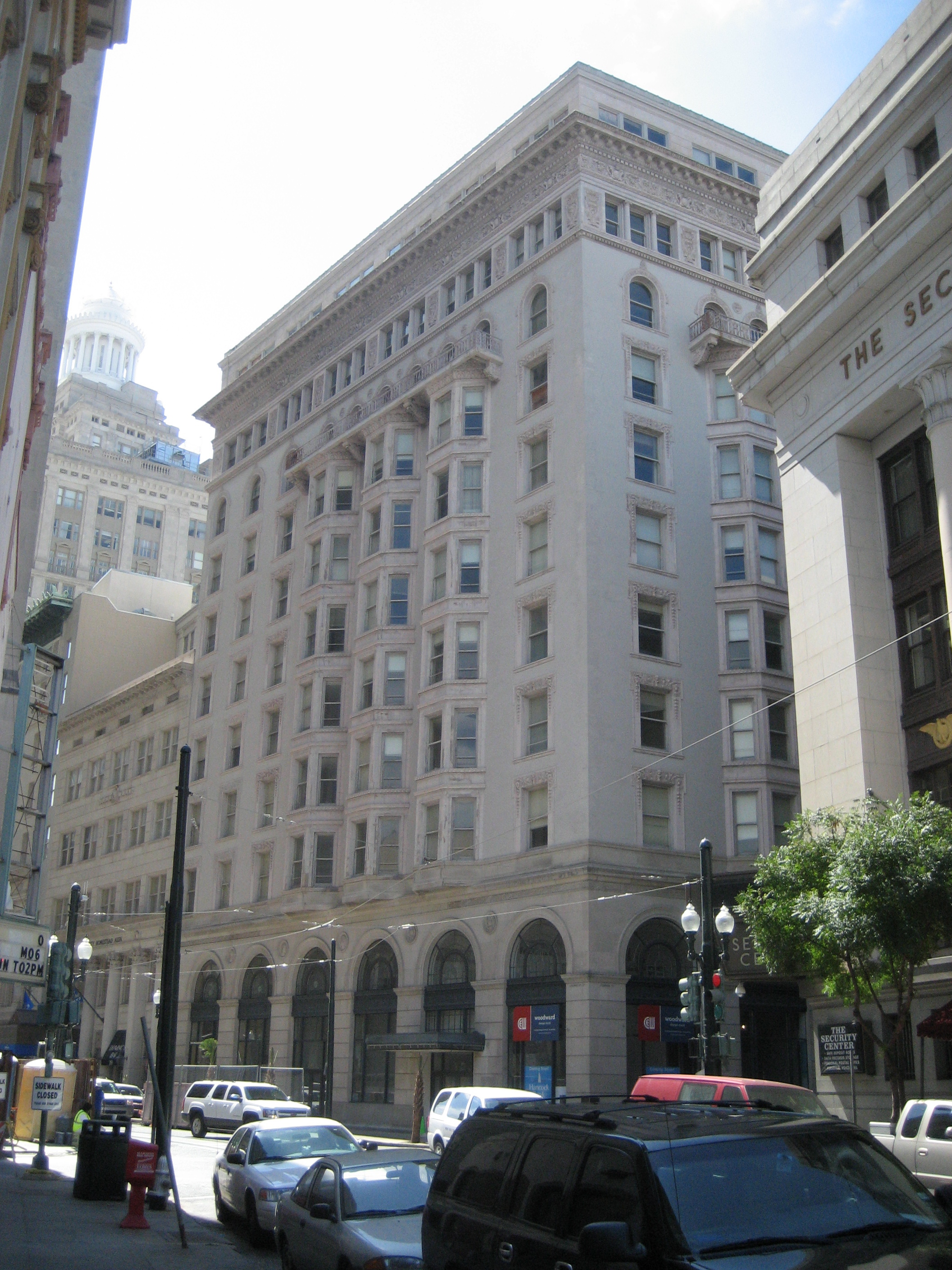
- Interactive map of The Maritime Building

General information
- Type: Residential & Commercial
- Location: 800 Common Street; New Orleans, LA; United States
- Coordinates: 29°57′09″N 90°04′17″W
- Completed: 1895

Height
- Antenna spire: N/A
- Roof: 158 feet (48 m)

Technical details
- Floor count: 11
- Floor area: Residences & Commercial: 486,692 square feet (45,215 m^{2})

Design and construction
- Architects: Sully & Toledano (1893–1895); Emile Weil (1920s additions); Marcel Wisznia (2013 renovation)

The Hennen Building, also known as the Canal-Commercial Building, Maritime Building, and briefly the Latter & Blum Building, is an 11-story, 158-foot (48 m) skyscraper in New Orleans, Louisiana. Individually listed on the National Register of Historic Places (NRHP), the building is located at 800 Common Street at the uptown lake corner with Carondelet Street. It is also NRHP-listed as a contributing building in New Orleans' Central Business District. The building is New Orleans' first and oldest skyscraper, holding the title of the city's tallest building from 1895-1904.

It was built as a 10-story Chicago style skyscraper; the eleventh floor was added in 1922.

The building was sold in 2006 to architect/developer Marcel Wisznia. Historically an office building, in 2009, Wisznia | Architecture + Development initiated the renovation and conversion into a mixed-use building with two floors of commercial space below 105 luxury apartments, known as The Maritime Apartments. Wisznia utilized both state and federal historic tax credits along with new markets tax credits to realize the project, as part of the revitalization of the New Orleans' Central Business District. The project was completed and the apartment was opened in 2011.

The building was sold to Holiday Inn Club Vacations in March 2019. The property was converted into timeshares and branded as Holiday Inn Club Vacations New Orleans Resort, which opened in January 2021.

== See also ==
- List of tallest buildings in New Orleans
