= Thomas O. Sully =

American architect (1855–1939)

Thomas Sully
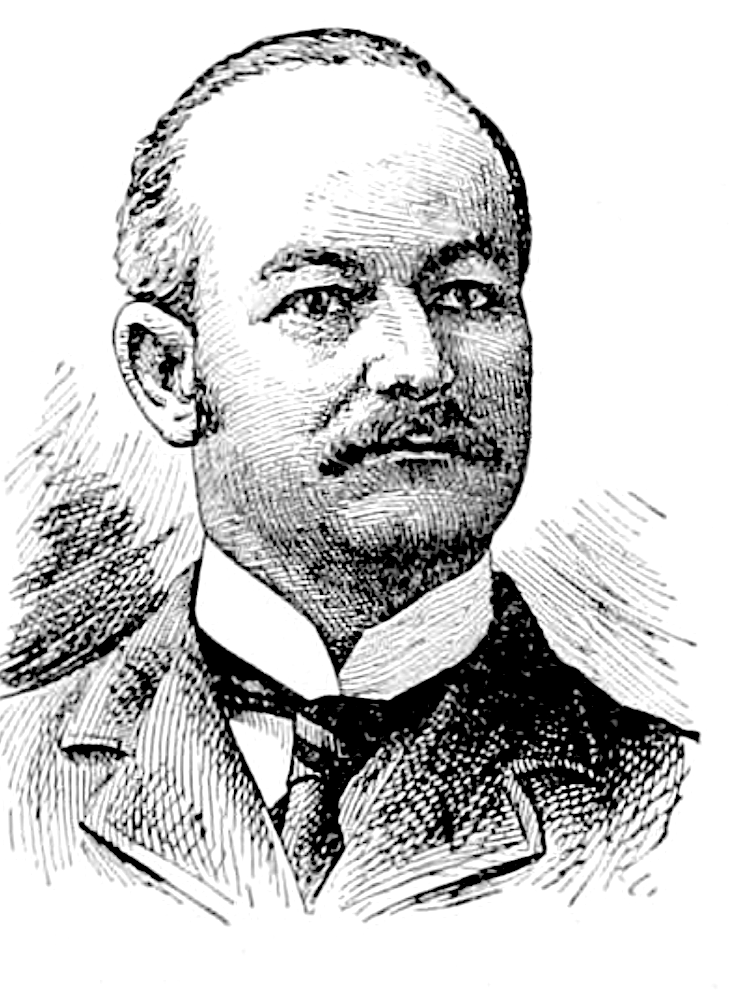
- Portrait from The National Cyclopaedia of American Biography (1899 edition)
- Born: November 24, 1855; Mississippi City, Mississippi, United States
- Died: March 15, 1939 (age 83); New Orleans, Louisiana, United States
- Occupation: Architect

Signature
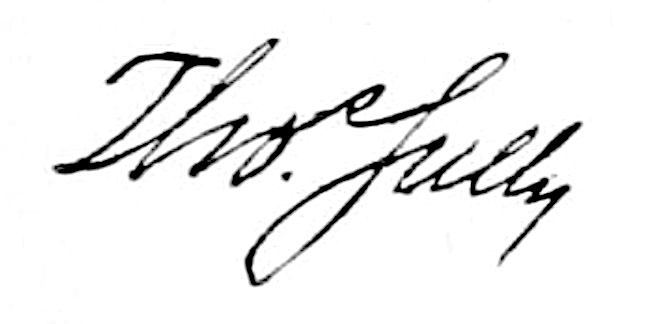

Thomas O. Sully (November 24, 1855 – March 15, 1939) was one of the most important architects in New Orleans at the end of the 19th century. Sully's works include the Hennen Building addition and Poplar Grove Plantation (1884) in Port Allen, Louisiana.

== Early life ==
Sully was born in Mississippi City, Mississippi, the son of Harriet Jane (née Green) and George Washington Sully. He was named after his great uncle, portrait painter Thomas Sully (1783–1872). He was raised in New Orleans.

== Career ==
In his early career, Sully apprenticed in Austin, Texas with architects Larmour & Wheelock; and in New York City with architects Slade & Marshall.

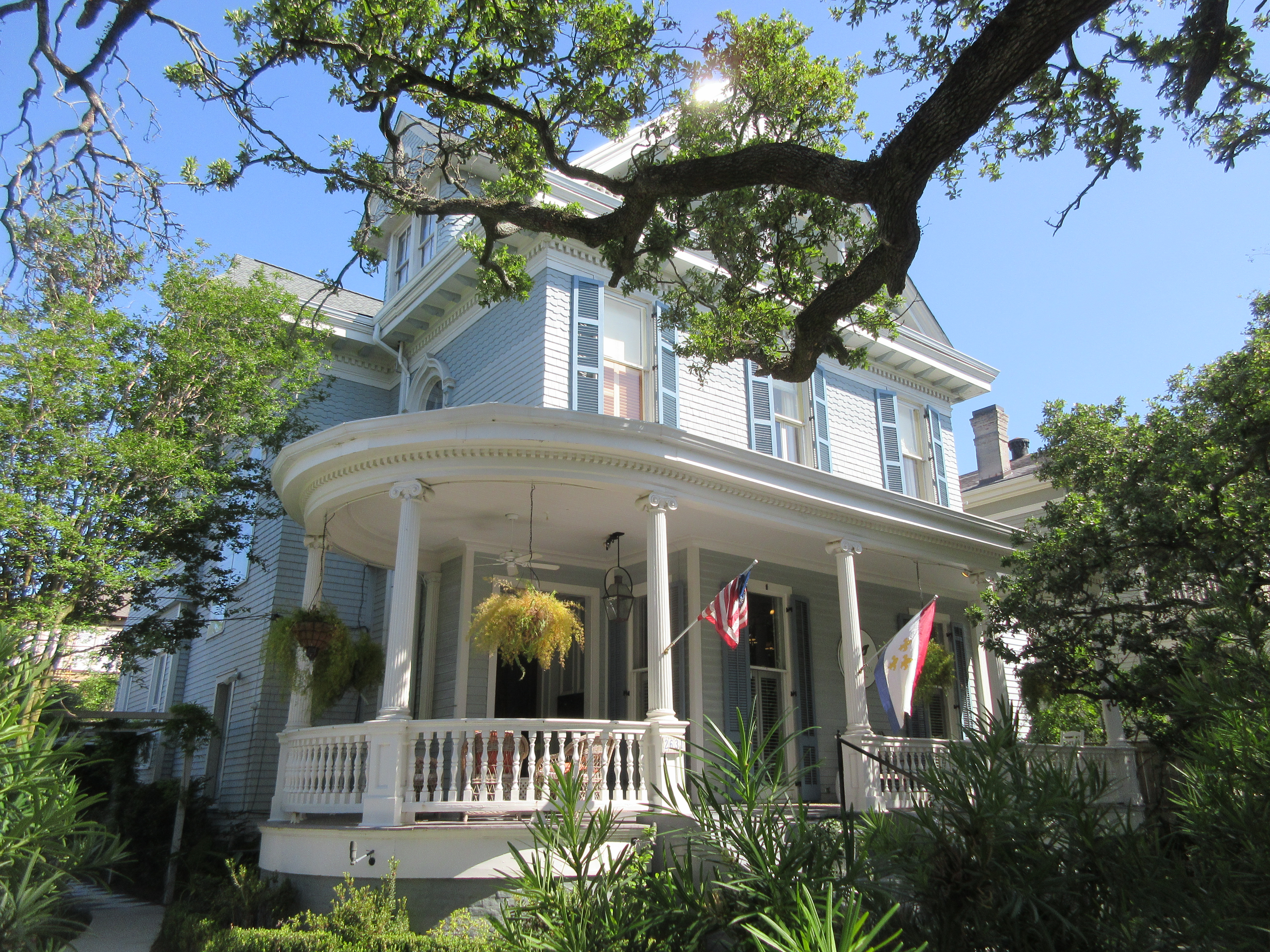
Sully Mansion Bed & Breakfast

In 1877, he returned to New Orleans and in 1881 established his firm. Sully lived at 4010 St. Charles Avenue (1886) in a house he built.

In 1887, Sully formed the firm Sulley & Toledano with Albert Toledano, who went on to design several notable buildings in the city. Sully returned to solo practice afterwards and then formed Sully, Burton & Stone. He retired in 1906.

His firm designed a top-floor penthouse office addition to the Hennen Building where they designed their office. It replaced a rooftop garden.

He served as the first president of the Louisiana State Association of Architects, a chapter of the American Institute of Architects (AIA) established in 1887.

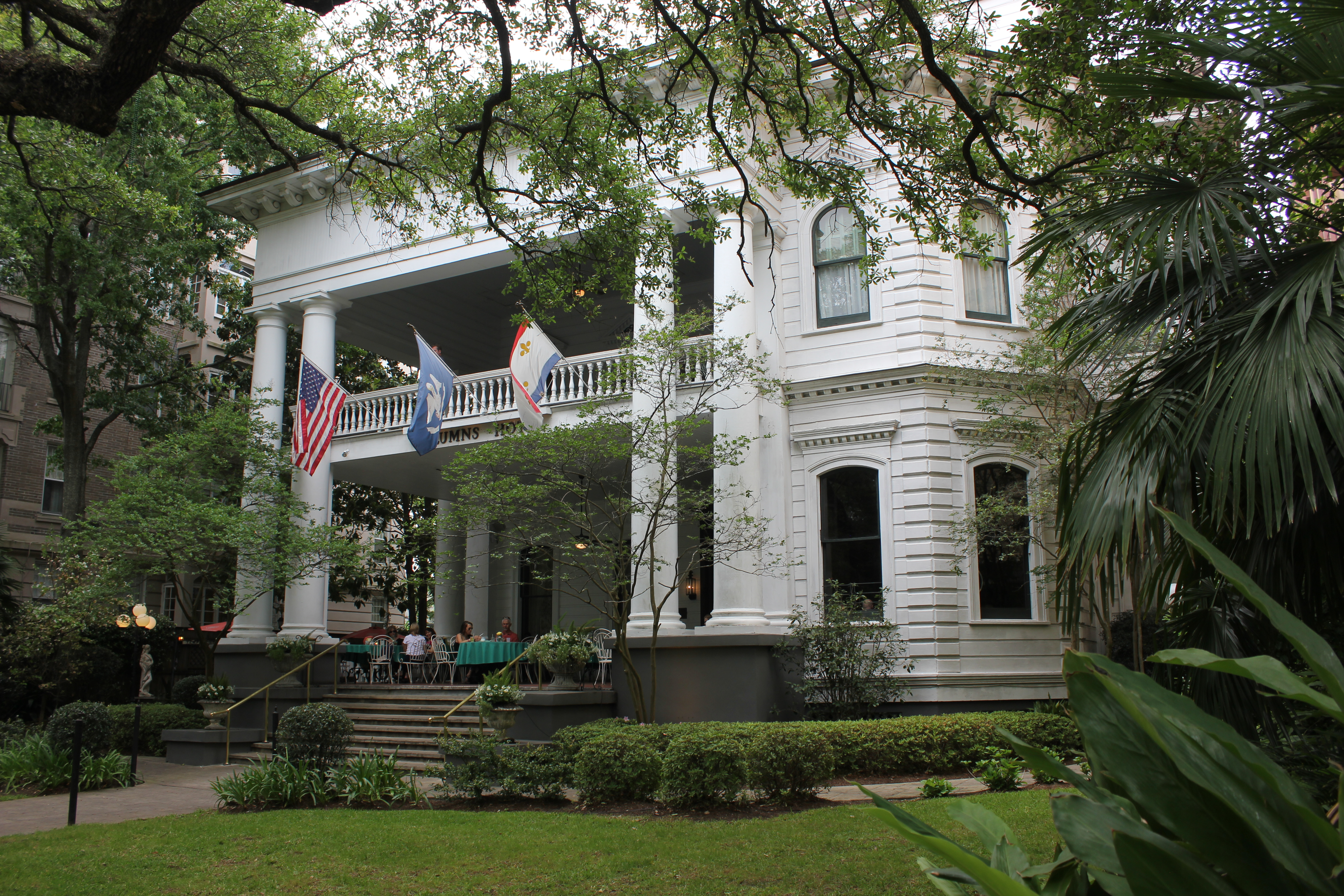
Columns Hotel

New Orleans architect Sam Stone, who went on to form Stone Brothers with his sons, began his career working at Sully's firm.

== Boating aficionado ==
A boating aficionado, Sully was commodore of the Southern Yacht Club in New Orleans for two terms, was photographed on his yacht Helen, and designed boats.

== Death ==
Sully died of pneumonia on March 15, 1939, in New Orleans. The Southeastern Architectural Archive at Tulane University has archival documents related to Sully.

== List of work ==
- Columns Hotel (1883), 3811 St. Charles Avenue, New Orleans, Louisiana
- Poplar Grove Plantation (1884), 3142 North River Rd., Port Allen, Louisiana; NRHP-listed
- Home (1886), 4010 St. Charles Avenue, New Orleans, Louisiana; built for his family
- The Orphanage (1887), 3000 Magazine St., New Orleans, Louisiana; originally an orphanage in the wake of a yellow fever epidemic, and is now an apartment building
- Abita Springs Pavilion (1888), St. Tammany Parish, Louisiana; NRHP-listed
- Sully Mansion (1890), 2631 Prytania Street, New Orleans, Louisiana; now a bed & breakfast
- Confederate Memorial Hall Museum (1890) 929 Camp St., New Orleans, Louisiana
- Hennen Building (1893, addition) 800 Common St., New Orleans, Louisiana
- Ellermann-Core House (1895), 1234 Henry Clay Avenue, New Orleans, Louisiana
- St. Charles Hotel (third version; 1896), St. Charles Avenue, New Orleans, Louisiana
- Sully-Wormouth House (1901), 1531 South Carrollton Avenue, New Orleans, Louisiana; he lived in the home until 1915
- Gulfport Yacht Club clubhouse (1903), Gulfport, Mississippi
- 2525 St. Charles Avenue, New Orleans, Louisiana
- 2727 St. Charles Avenue, New Orleans, Louisiana; a bed & breakfast
- 3811 St. Charles Avenue, New Orleans, Louisiana
- 6000 St. Charles Avenue, New Orleans, Louisiana
- Four homes on St. Mary Street, Lower Garden District, New Orleans, Louisiana
- 7 Richmond Place, New Orleans, Louisiana
- 17 Richmond Place, New Orleans, Louisiana
- 1305 South Carrollton Avenue, New Orleans, Louisiana
- Frank T. Howard No. 1 School, and Elizabeth F. Howard Kindergarten, New Orleans, Louisiana
- Howard Memorial Hall, New Orleans, Louisiana
- Medical Building, 124-126 Baronne Street, New Orleans, Louisiana
- New Orleans National Bank, 201 Camp Street, New Orleans, Louisiana
- Valence Street Baptist Church, 4636 Magazine St., New Orleans, Louisiana
