= Lauren Rogers Museum of Art =

Art museum in Laurel, Mississippi

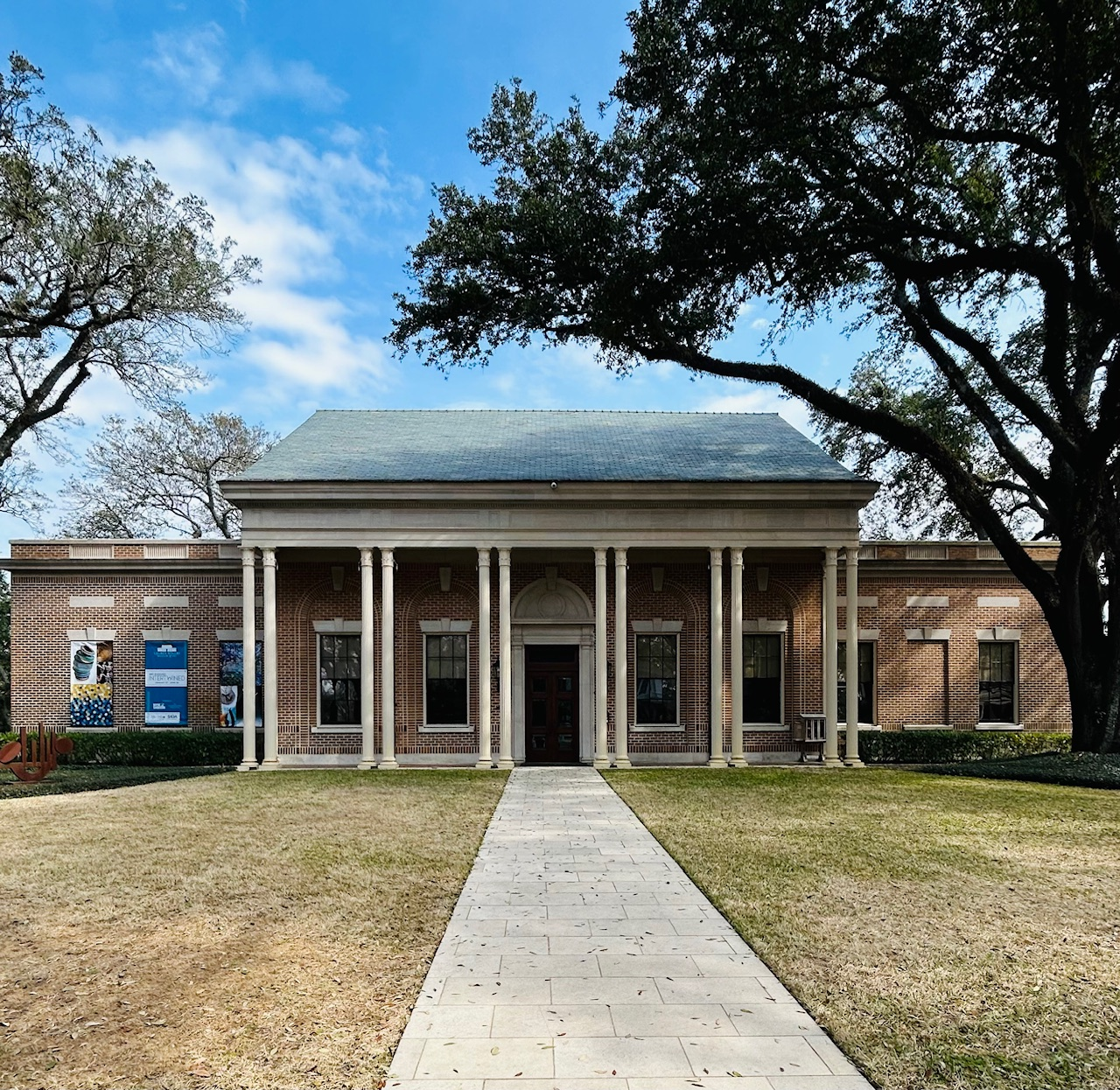
- Established: 1921
- Location: 565 N. 5th Ave; Laurel, Mississippi
- Coordinates: 31.6967°N 89.1310°W
- Type: Art Museum
- Website: lrma.org

The Lauren Rogers Museum of Art (LRMA) is an art museum in Laurel, Mississippi, United States. Founded in 1923, it was the first art museum established in the state. Its collections include American and European paintings, Native American basketry, British Georgian silver, and Japanese ukiyo-e prints. The museum also maintains a reference library of more than 10,000 volumes on art and regional history.

== History ==
The Eastman, Gardiner, and Rogers families relocated from Clinton, Iowa, to Laurel, Mississippi in the 1890s to establish the Eastman, Gardiner and Rogers lumber business. Lauren Rogers (1898–1921), the son of Nina Eastman and Wallace Brown Rogers, married Lelia Payne Hodson in 1920. He died the following year at age 23 from complications of appendicitis while the couple was building a home on the site of the present museum. In 1922, Lauren's grandparents established the Eastman Memorial Foundation to create and operate an art museum and library in his memory, and the museum opened to the public on May 1, 1923, in a building constructed on the site of the planned residence.

The public library was later relocated to a separate downtown building, and following completion of an addition in 1983, the museum shifted its focus to its art collection and education programs.

== Architecture ==
The Georgian Revival building, designed by architect Rathbone DeBuys of New Orleans, is constructed of local brick with Indiana limestone trim and a slate roof. The original structure contained a single art gallery and space for a public library. The Eastman Memorial Foundation initially planned to establish a public library for Laurel and Jones County and added a museum wing after construction began.

A wing completed in 1925 expanded the building to approximately 18,000 square feet and added five galleries for permanent and temporary exhibitions, along with a lower-level library that remained in use until 1978. A further addition in 1983 provided offices, work areas, storage, and access to lower-level galleries for temporary and traveling exhibitions. At that time, the grounds and gardens were also renovated.

Lauren Rogers’s childhood home, a 7,500-square-foot Prairie-style house completed in 1903 across the street from the museum, was donated to the museum in 2003 by the family of George Gardiner Green Sr. It is used for administrative offices and museum programs. An addition completed in 2013 brought the museum to nearly 29,000 square feet and expanded its gallery, library, and studio facilities.

=== Lower–level galleries ===
The lower-level galleries originally housed the public library for Laurel and Jones County. Following renovation in 1983, the space was adapted for temporary and traveling exhibitions. Notable exhibitions have included Medieval to Metal: The Art and Evolution of the Guitar and a selection of photographs by Walker Evans. Since its founding, the museum has presented more than 800 temporary and traveling exhibitions, including works by Pablo Picasso, Henri de Toulouse-Lautrec, and Norman Rockwell.

=== Reading room and library ===
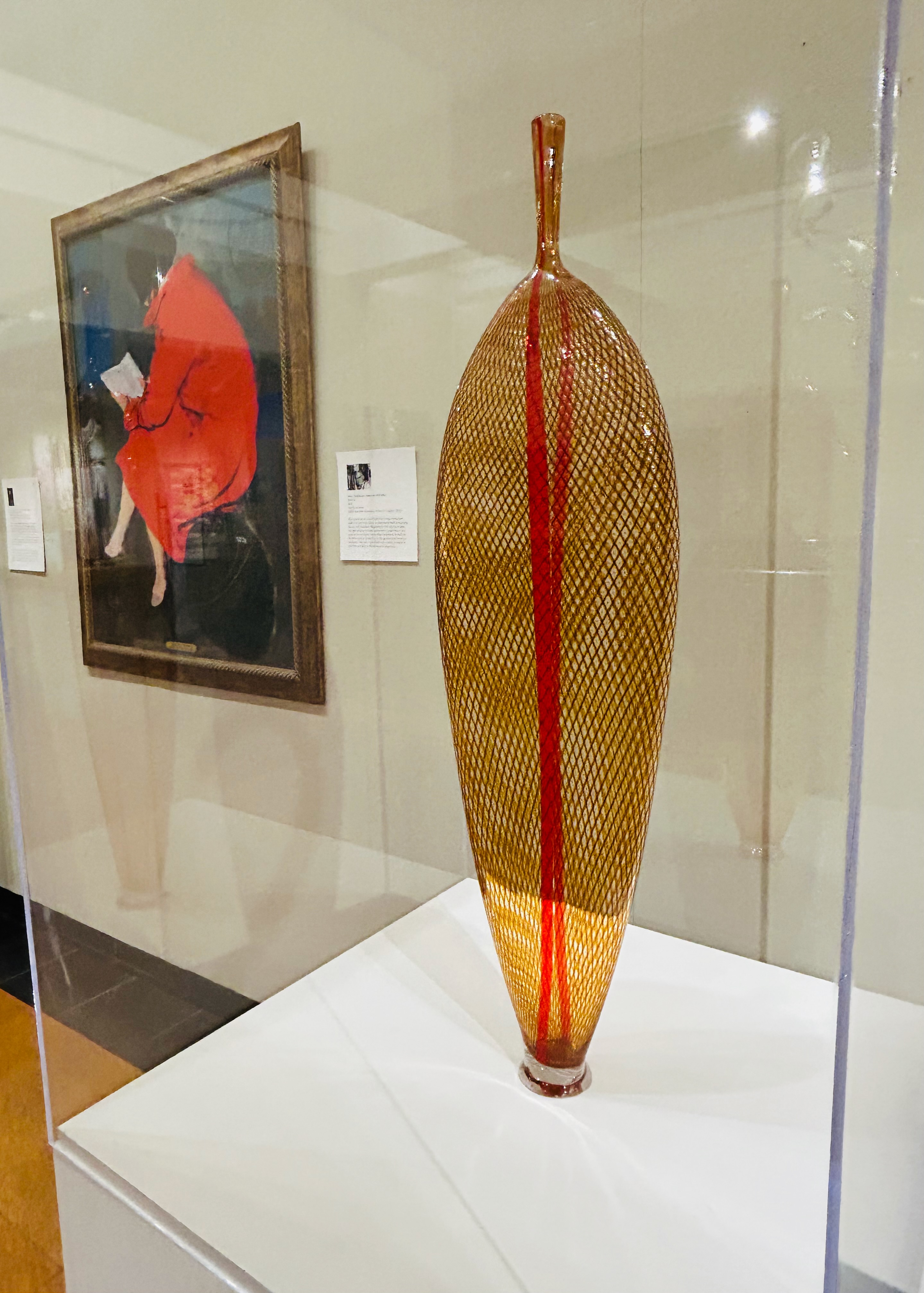
Dante Marioni, blown glass, 2016

The museum maintains an art and local history library containing more than 10,000 volumes, including reference works on art, museums, Mississippi history, historical photographs, archival documents, and early twentieth-century postcards. The reading room, originally designed as an art gallery, is located on the north side of the lobby and contains family furnishings, portraits, and memorabilia associated with the Rogers family.

== Collections ==
LRMA holds five specialized collections: American art, European paintings, Native American basketry, Japanese Ukiyo-e prints, and British Georgian silver. When it opened in 1923, gifts of Native American baskets from Lauren Rogers’s great-aunt, Catherine Marshall Gardiner, along with nineteenth- and twentieth-century American and European artworks from members of the Rogers and Eastman families were donated to the museum. The collections are free and open to the public six days a week.

=== American art ===
Members of the Rogers and Eastman families contributed nineteenth- and twentieth-century American and European paintings, works on paper, and sculpture. During its first decade, the museum acquired works by major American painters including Winslow Homer, Albert Bierstadt, George Inness, John Henry Twachtman, and John Singer Sargent.

The collection also includes works by Mary Cassatt, Thomas Moran, John Sloan, and glass artist Dale Chihuly. The museum’s holdings include works by Mississippi artists such as Kate Freeman Clark and John B. McDonald, as well as modern and contemporary artists including Romare Bearden and Ida Kohlmeyer.

=== European art ===
The museum’s European art collection originated with works donated by members of the Rogers and Eastman families when the museum opened in 1923. These gifts included nineteenth- and twentieth-century European paintings. The gallery includes works by artists such as Jean-François Millet, Eugène Boudin, and Rembrandt van Rijn.

=== British Georgian silver ===
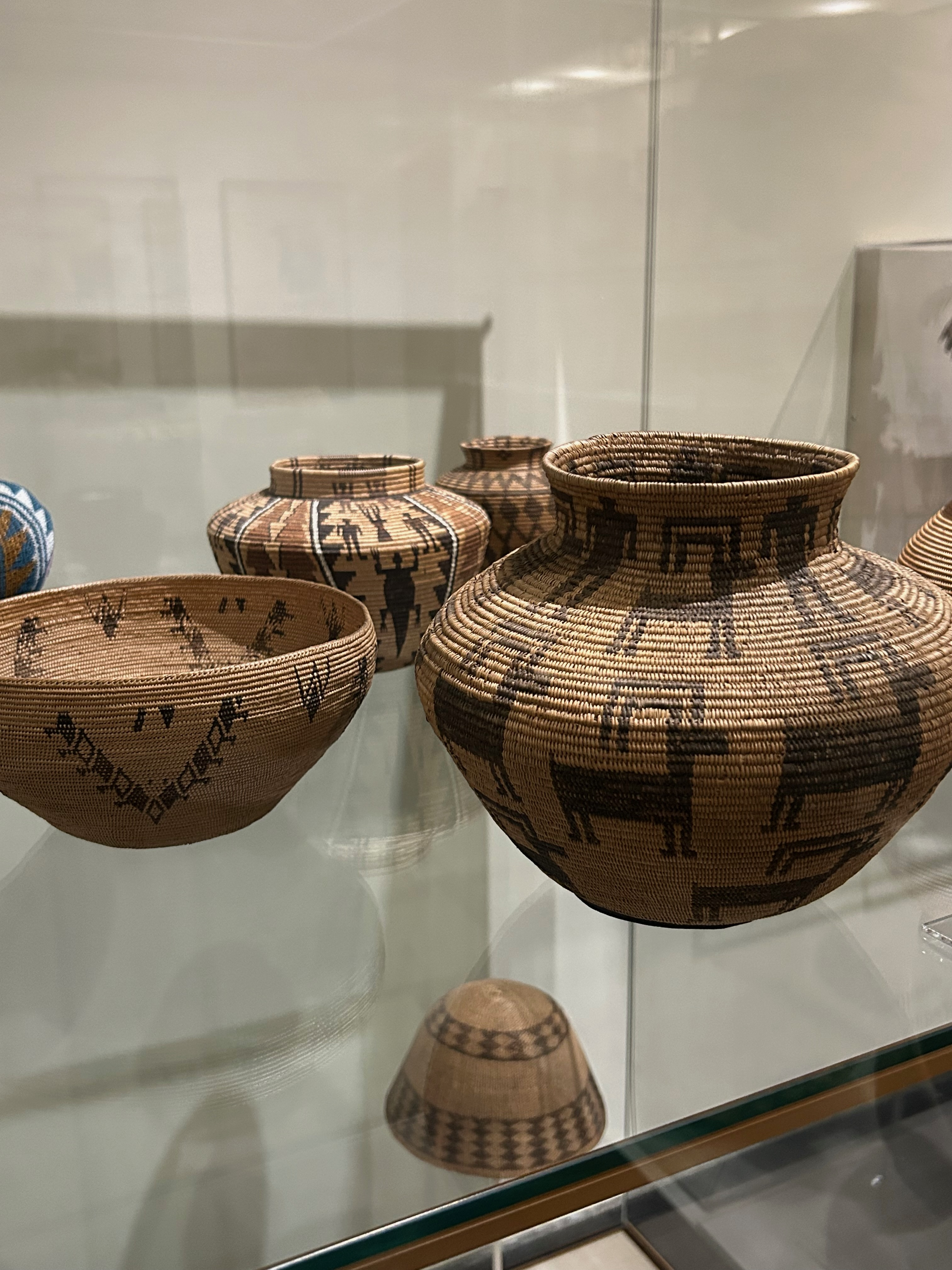
Native American baskets

The museum’s British Georgian silver collection was formed through early acquisitions from the Nina Eastman Rogers Estate and later expanded by gifts from Harriet and Thomas Gibbons. The museum has continued to add to the collection in subsequent years.

Recent acquisitions include a sugar basket (1778) by Hester Bateman, a silver-mounted coconut cup (1799) by William Parker (silversmith), and a chocolate pot attributed to Daniel Sleamaker. The collection comprises 65 major objects associated with the service of tea and coffee, including tea caddies, teapots, coffee pots, cake baskets, and salvers. The works are displayed in the museum’s renovated Silver Gallery.

=== Japanese woodblock prints ===
During the 1920s, Rogers’s parents donated 142 eighteenth-and nineteenth-century Japanese woodblock prints to the museum. These early gifts formed the foundation of the museum’s Japanese print collection for much of the twentieth century. The museum’s Japanese woodblock print holdings include works from the eighteenth- and nineteenth-century ukiyo-e tradition. Notable examples include Evening Glow at Ryōgoku (c. 1818) by Utagawa Kunisada and The Tayū Shinowara of the House Tsuru-ya (c. 1793) by Hosoda Eishi.

=== Native American Basketry ===
When it opened in 1923, the museum received gifts of nearly 500 Native American baskets from Lauren Rogers’s great-aunt, Catherine Marshall Gardiner. At the time, the collection was regarded as one of the most significant assemblages of North American Native basketry in the southeastern United States.

The present collection contains more than 800 baskets, including 500 from North America.

== See also ==
- Mississippi Museum of Art
- Ohr–O'Keefe Museum of Art

== Sources ==
- Bassi, George D.; Zohn, Kristen Miller (2023). A Century of Collecting: American and European Paintings, Prints and Sculpture at the Lauren Rogers Museum of Art. Laurel, Mississippi: Goosepen Studio Press.
- Black, Patti Carr (1998). Art in Mississippi, 1720-1980 (Heritage of Mississippi Series, Vol 1). University Press of Mississippi. p. 32. ISBN 978-1578060849.
