= Mobile Yacht Club =

Private yacht club from Mobile, Alabama

- Burgee
- Founded: 1847
- Location: Marina Drive North, Mobile, Alabama 36605
- John O'Brien
- Website: mobileyachtclub.com

The Mobile Yacht Club (MYC) is a private boat club and harbor that first met as a group in 1847 before establishing a physical clubhouse in the 1850s. It is located in Mobile, Alabama.

The Mobile Yacht Club sponsors and participates annually in numerous club regattas as well as races in affiliation with the Gulf Yachting Association, of which MYC is a charter member. The club has competed in the Dauphin Island Regatta, the GYA-sponsored Liptons, the Broken Triangle Race, the Around-the-Rig Regatta, and the MYC Anniversary Regatta.

== History ==
In the 1840s, young businessmen had organized the Mobile Yacht Club (earlier called the Mobile Regatta Club) and began holding regattas at the watering holes on Point Clear, Battles Wharf, and Howard's Landing. Mobile Yacht Club's first club house was located on the east bank of the Mobile River, opposite St. Francis Street.

The Civil War and the presence of the Union Fleet in the bay caused MYC to suspend its activities for several years. In 1868, the MYC was again holding regattas. In the 1880s, Mobile yachtsmen had reorganized their club and sold stock to build a clubhouse on a newly acquired plot on the Mobile River just opposite downtown.

The membership soon outgrew that small house, and at the 1897 annual meeting, the Commodore appointed a committee to consider a new building. A New Orleans architect and member of the Southern Yacht Club, Thomas Sully, designed the club house a few years later, and it was built near the old location on the Mobile River.

A hurricane on July 5, 1916, combined with a high tide, destroyed the club and set many yachts adrift.

By the end of World War I, the members had re-established the club on the bay's Eastern Shore, where it had re-established the club under the name of Mobile Yacht Club, and moved to Barret's Beach. In 1940, just north of the mouth of the Dog River, the club built a two-story house. After Hurricane Frederic in 1979, the current version of the Mobile Yacht Club was constructed.
