= Rathbone DeBuys =

American architect

Rathbone Emilie DeBuys.
- Born: December 1, 1874; New Orleans, Louisiana, US
- Died: June 27, 1960 (aged 85); New Orleans, Louisiana, US
- Occupation: Architect

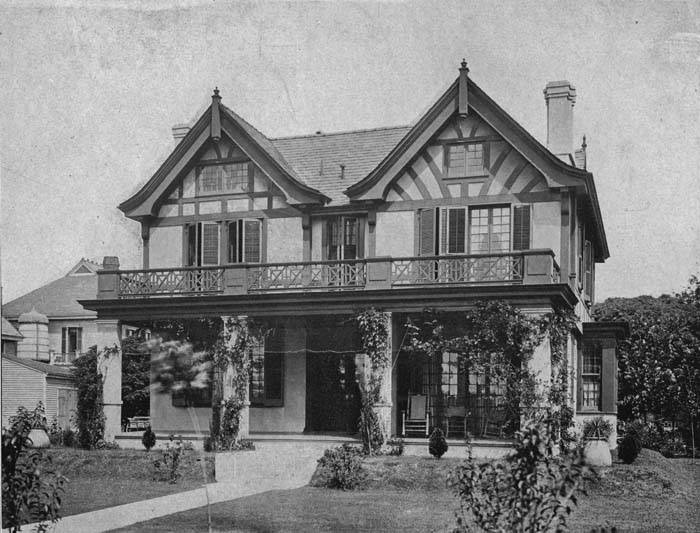
House designed by Rathbone DeBuys in New Orleans in 1908.

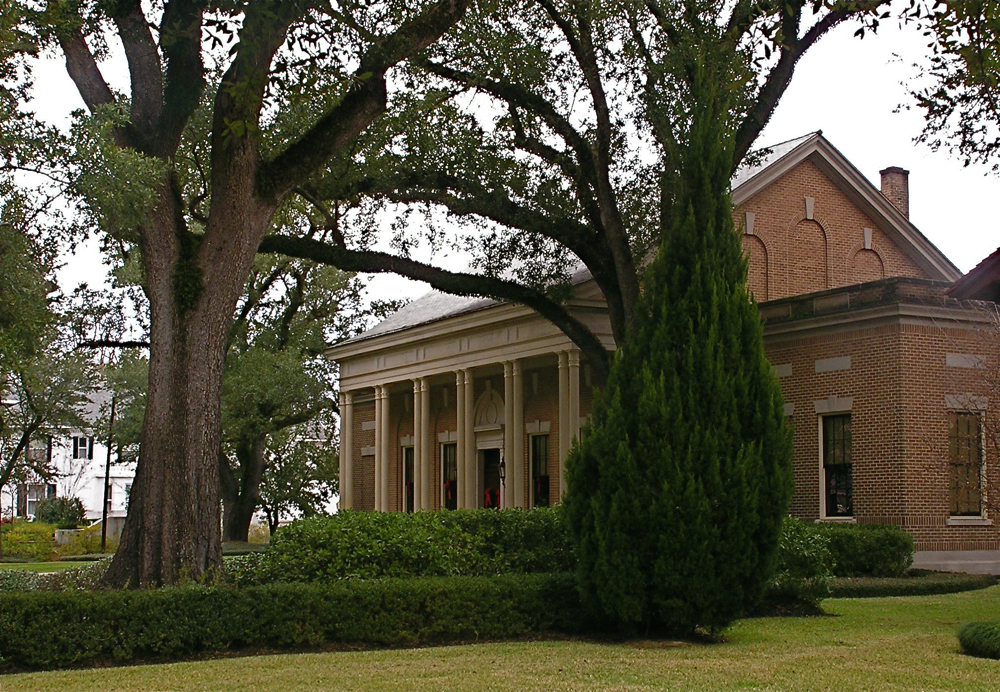
Rathbone DeBuys is responsible for the Georgian Revival design of the Lauren Rogers Museum of Art in Laurel, Mississippi

Rathbone Emile DeBuys (December 1, 1874 − June 27, 1960) was an American architect and sailing enthusiast based in New Orleans, Louisiana. DeBuy's Station was named for his father.

== Education ==
He attended Tulane University and graduated with a degree in 1896 in civil engineering and later in 1897 with a degree in architecture.

In 1897, he received his doctorate from Yale University where he was a student in the Gerald Sheffield School of the Art.

== Career ==
After college, he joined the Architectural firm De Buys, Churchill & Labouisse from 1905 until 1912. He is credited with designing numerous historically significant buildings in Louisiana and Mississippi, including the Lauren Rogers Museum of Art and the Southern Yacht Club, where he was also a member. He also designed the Hattiesburg Postoffice, Pine Hills Hotel at Pass Christian, Gulf Park College at Gulfport, Brookhaven Bank and Trust Company, and Y. M. C. A. Building at Picayune.

In his home state of Louisiana, he is credited with designing the layout for the city of Bogalusa, Louisiana in 1906. He also was the architect for several Catholic churches, banks, and school buildings. He designed or contributed to the design of Loyola University New Orleans's Thomas hall, "Gesu" McDermott Memorial church, Nicholas D. Burke Seismic Observatory, and Marquette hall. He also designed the City Bank & Trust building, New Orleans Country club, Tulane gymnasium, Richardson Memorial dormitory, Henderson Sugar Refinery, and the residences of Nelson Whitney and Mrs. John A. Morris.

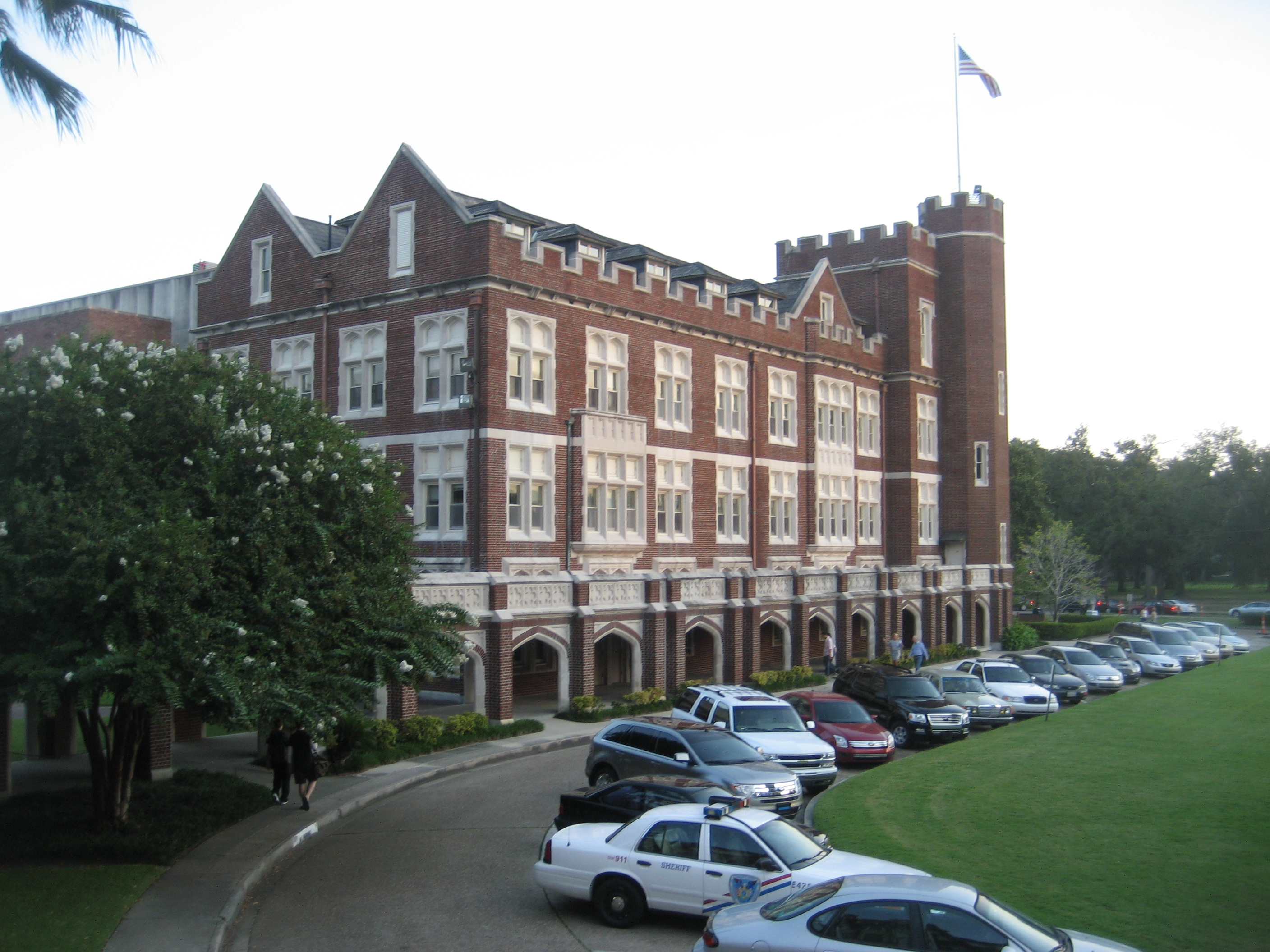
Loyola University New Orleans' Thomas Hall, which was designed by Rathbone DeBuys.

As chairman of the Southern Yacht Club, DeBuys helped design the one-design Fish class sloop in 1919 in part to help renew interest in sailing post-World War I and to make it more affordable for beginners. It quickly became the most popular one design class in the Gulf South and the primary one-design racing dinghy for the Gulf Yachting Association.

== Personal life ==
DeBuys married Corine Sophia Isabelle Von Meysenberg on February 2, 1901. The couple had three children.

DeBuys's maternal second great-grandmother was Delphine LaLaurie, the infamous New Orleans socialite and serial killer.

== Death ==
DeBuys died after succumbing to a short illness in the summer of 1960 at the age of 85.
