= Southern Yacht Club =

Yacht club in New Orleans

Coordinates: 30.027482°N 90.114115°W

- Burgee
- Short name: SYC
- Founded: 1849
- Location: New Orleans, Louisiana, United States
- Website: www.southernyachtclub.org

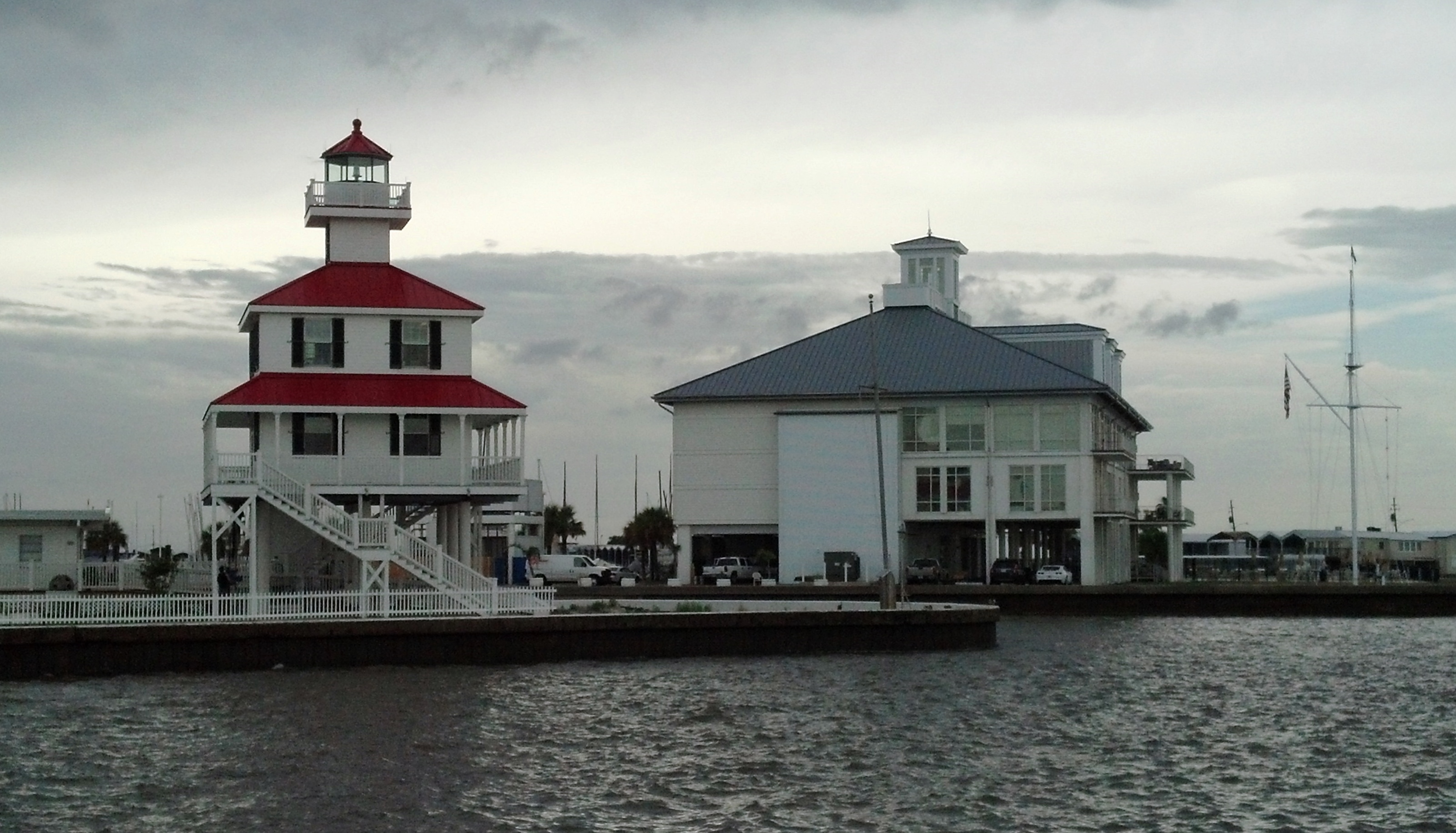
Southern Yacht Club

The Southern Yacht Club is located in New Orleans, Louisiana's West End neighborhood, on the shores of Lake Pontchartrain. Established on July 21, 1849, it is the second oldest yacht club in the United States and a founding member of the Gulf Yachting Association.

== Sailing ==
Southern Yacht Club is an extremely active sailing club and is the organizing body for the Race to the Coast, the oldest point to point regatta in the Western Hemisphere. Initially raced on July 4, 1850, the race continues to this day with the course starting on the shores of New Orleans on Lake Pontchartrain and finishing in Gulfport, Mississippi.

Southern Yacht Club also is host to an active Viper 640, Rhodes 19, Vanguard 15, Sunfish, 420, Laser, Optimist (dinghy) and J-22 fleet as well as multiple Handicap and Offshore Racing Fleets and several high school sailing programs. Additionally, the Southern Yacht Club has, for over fifty years, hosted Intercollegiate Sailing Association regattas including The New Orleans Sugar Bowl Regatta, often partnering with Tulane University as the yacht club is the home of the Tulane Green Wave sailing team.

Southern Yacht Club is home to four U.S. Sailing Olympic medalists including Gilbert Gray who in 1932 won a Gold Medal in Los Angeles in the Star Class, G. Shelby Friedrichs Jr. won Gold in the Dragon Class in Mexico City, 1968 and most recently, John C. Lovell who received a Silver Medal in Athens in 2004 as well as numerous other national and international champions.

== History ==
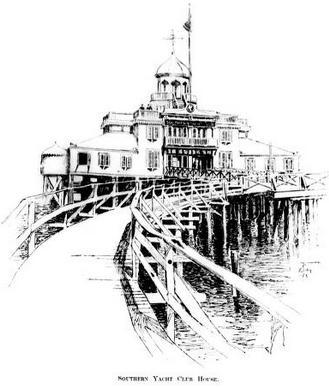
Southern Yacht Club House c 1894

The Southern Yacht Club of New Orleans, traces its roots to the Gulf Coast resort of Pass Christian, Mississippi and to the year 1849, making it the second oldest yacht club in the United States.

New Orleans in the antebellum era was a thriving port city, banking center and cultural leader. However, during the summer months, many New Orleanians retreated to the Gulf Coast to flee the heat, humidity and yellow fever. Summer homes, hotels and boarding houses dotted the coast from Waveland, Mississippi to Mobile Bay. A favorite among New Orleanians was the Pass Christian Hotel. There, SYC’s organizational meeting was held on July 21, 1849 and the hotel became its headquarters for several years. On August 8, 1849, Southern Yacht Club's first regatta was sailed in the Mississippi Sound off of Pass Christian, Mississippi with twenty-two yachts answering the starting gun and was won by Captain Robert A. Hiern of Mobile, Alabama sailing on the sloop Undine. Activities continued at "the Pass " until 1857 when the club relocated to New Orleans and held its regattas on Lake Pontchartrain.

The seventeen years of the American Civil War and Reconstruction greatly curtailed boating activities until 1878 when the club was reorganized and its first postwar regatta held. The following year, a handsome clubhouse was built over the water. It became the scene of many elaborate social events as well as sailing competition. In 1899 a new and larger clubhouse was erected under the leadership of Commodore Albert Baldwin. Regattas continued annually on the lake with the fleet competing each summer in interclub races on the gulf coast.

Designed by Rathbone DeBuys, a Southern YC member, the one design Fish class sloop had its debut in 1919 and quickly became the most popular one design class in the Gulf South. Other early classes of yachts introduced were the Massachusetts Bay 21 Footers, Stars and Sound Interclubs.

The 1899 clubhouse had been extensively enlarged and renovated in 1920, but by 1949 it had deteriorated and was replaced by a modern, concrete and steel structure. This building was expanded in the 1960s and 1980s, and another major expansion was to begin in 2005. However, Hurricane Katrina struck in August of that year, causing widespread destruction throughout the region. Heavily damaged by wind and flood waters, the clubhouse was ultimately destroyed by a massive fire which burned, unchecked, in the hours following the storm. Many historic yachting trophies and other artifacts were lost in the fire.

Under the leadership of Commodores Ewell Potts III and Hjalmar Breit, an interim facility was quickly erected to meet the needs of the membership and the renowned local firm of Waggoner & Ball Architects was retained to design a new facility. SYC's fourth clubhouse was dedicated September 12, 2009. It is a modern structure containing luxurious appointments and state-of-the-art sailing accommodations. Commodore James Wade, christened the clubhouse in September 2009, in anticipation of Southern's 160th anniversary in October 2009.

New Orleans architect and boating aficionado Thomas O. Sully served as commodore of the Southern Yacht Club for two terms and was photographed on his yacht Helen. He also designed boats.
