= Viper 640 =

Planing one-design keelboat

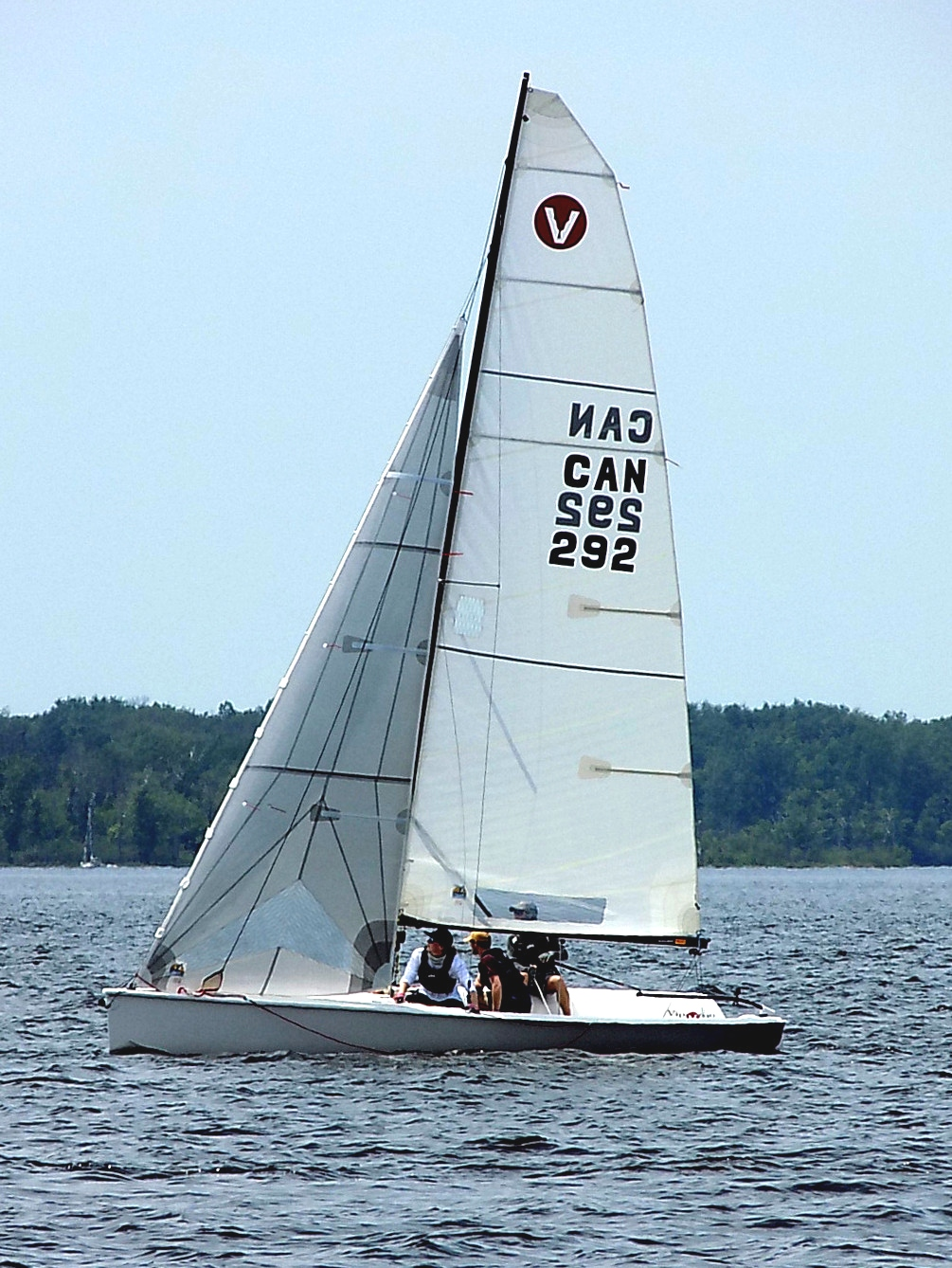

Development
- Designer: Brian Bennett
- Location: United States
- Year: 1996
- No. built: 400
- Builders: Viper Boats; SERO Sailing

Boat
- Displacement: 750 lb (340 kg)
- Draft: 4.49 ft (1.37 m) daggerboard down

Hull
- Type: Monohull
- Construction: Fiberglass
- LOA: 21.08 ft (6.43 m)
- LWL: 19.08 ft (5.82 m)
- Beam: 8.17 ft (2.49 m)
- Engine: Outboard motor

Hull appendages
- Keel: lifting keel with weighted bulb
- Ballast: 262 lb (119 kg)
- Rudder: transom-mounted rudder

Rig
- Rig type: Bermuda rig
- I foretriangle height: 21.98 ft (6.70 m)
- J foretriangle base: 7.48 ft (2.28 m)
- P mainsail luff: 25.62 ft (7.81 m)
- E mainsail foot: 10.07 ft (3.07 m)

Sails
- Sailplan: Fractional rigged sloop
- Mainsail area: 129.00 sq ft (11.984 m^{2})
- Jib/genoa area: 82.21 sq ft (7.638 m^{2})
- Spinnaker area: 425 sq ft (39.5 m^{2})
- Total sail area: 211.20 sq ft (19.621 m^{2})

Racing
- PHRF: 99 (average)

The Viper 640 is a recreational keelboat, that was designed by Brian Bennett and first built in 1996.

The Viper 640 is an accepted World Sailing class boat and the official one-design boat of the Gulf Yachting Association for its Capdevielle Series.

== Production ==
The boat was originally built by Viper Boats in the United States and then in 2005 Rondar Raceboats of the United Kingdom was named the official class manufacturer. 400 examples had been completed by 2018.

== Design ==
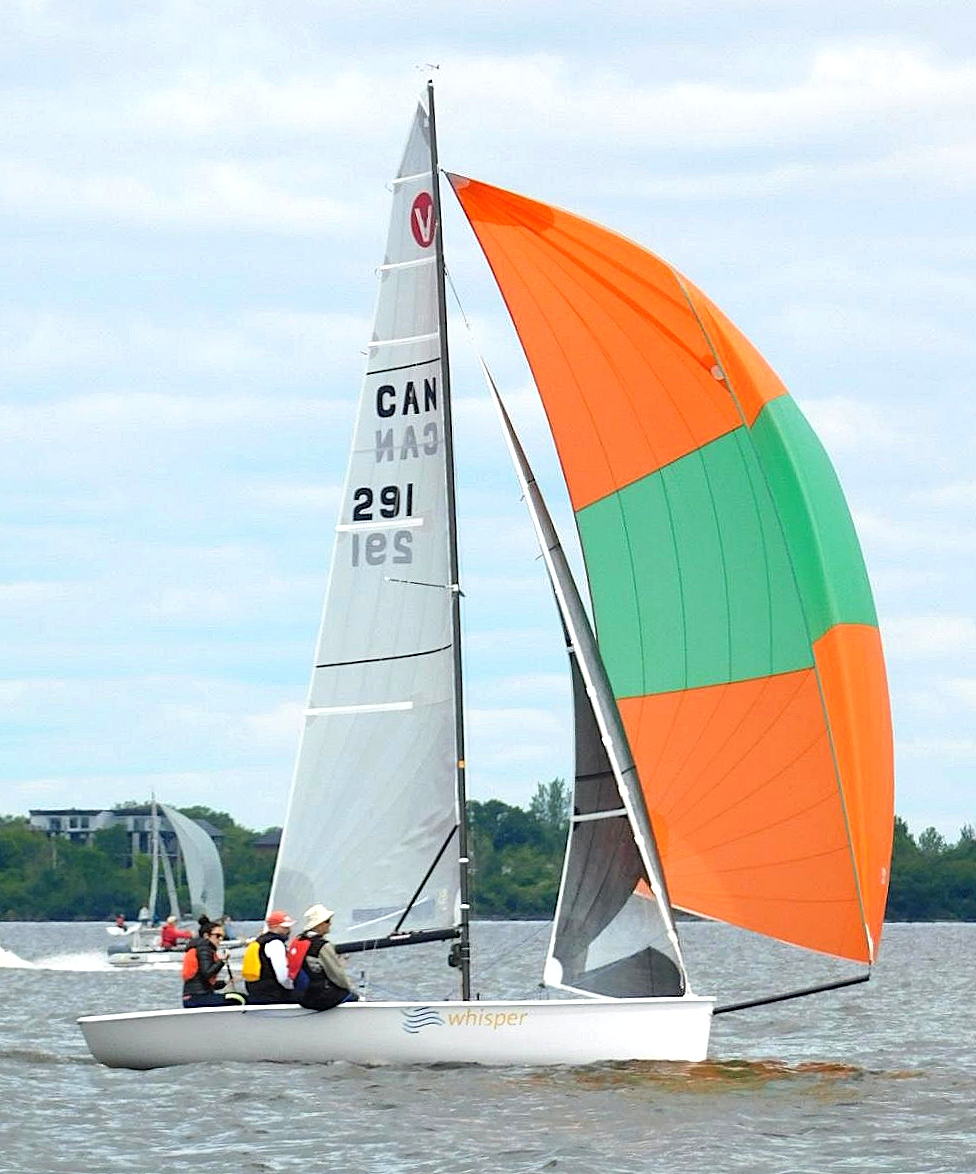
Viper 640 flying its spinnaker

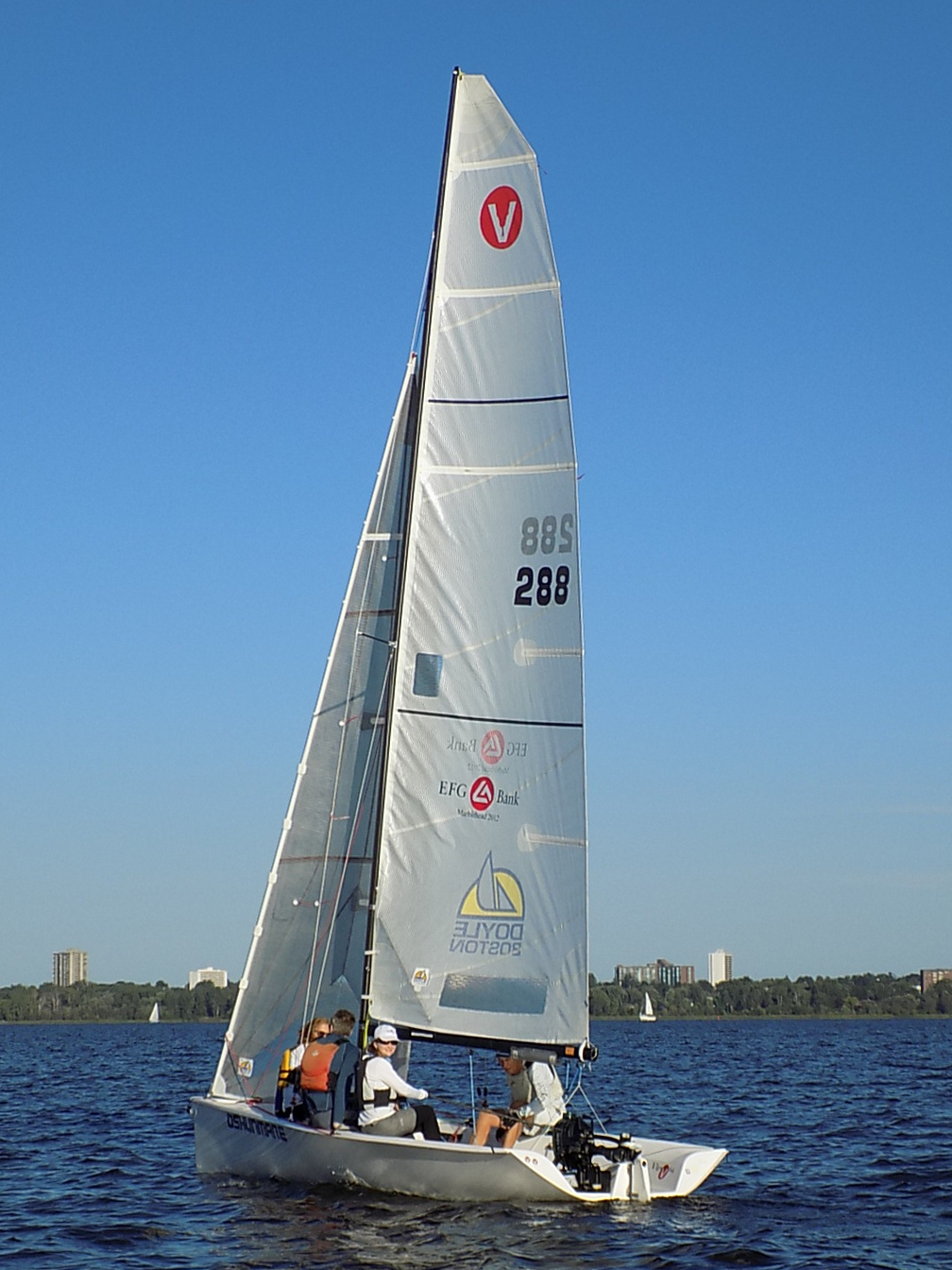
Viper 640, showing the open transom

The Viper 640 was designed to combine the planing performance of a dinghy with the stability of a keelboat. The result is a small recreational planing keelboat, built predominantly of fiberglass, with carbon fiber spars. It has a fractional sloop rig, a plumb stem, an open transom, a transom-hung rudder and a lifting fin daggerboard-style keel, with a weighted bulb, with 220 lb (100 kg) of lead ballast. The keel is retained in the down position with two bolts while sailing. The design displaces 750 lb (340 kg) and is equipped with an asymmetrical spinnaker of 425 sq ft (39.5 m^{2}) for downwind sailing.

The boat has a draft of 4.49 ft (1.37 m) with the lifting keel extended and 1.83 ft (0.56 m) with it retracted, allowing ground transportation on a trailer.

The boat may be optionally fitted with a small outboard motor for docking and maneuvering.

The design has a PHRF racing average handicap of 99 with a high of 111 and low of 96. It has a hull speed of 5.85 kn (10.83 km/h).

== Reception ==
Cruising World magazine named the design Overall Boat of the Year and top Performance One-Design of 2002, stating "the panelists agreed that the Viper is inherently simple, offers quality construction at a great price, and is extremely fun to sail. An attractive looking boat, the Viper invites a wide range of sailors to an equally wide range of sailing."
