= Fish-class sloop =

One-design 20-foot keelboat

The Fish class sloop, also known informally as the Fish Boat, is a one-design sailboat designed in 1919 by New Orleans resident Rathbone DeBuys, member of the Southern Yacht Club. It is reputed to have been the most popular sailboat racing class on the US Gulf Coast in the early 20th century and was the Gulf Yachting Association one-design racer until it was replaced by the Flying Scot in 1969.

It should not be confused with Nat Herreshoff's larger sloops, the Annisquam Fish Class Marconi rigged catboats, nor various motor yachts and surfboards of similar names.

== Specifications ==
The Fish class sloop is a gaff-rig, fixed-keel, hard chine, v-hull sloop, originally made of wood, which can carry a crew of from two to five (usually three) depending on the wind. Its specifications are length 20' 6", waterline 16', beam 6', draft 3', weight 1,500 lb (680 kg), ballast 220 lb (100 kg), sail area 270 sq ft (25 m^{2}), mainsail area 216 sq ft (20.1 m^{2}), jibsail area 54 sq ft (5.0 m^{2}). In early years a club foot jib was used and in later a genoa jib was used. Rules have been modified to allow aluminum spars and hulls made partially or totally of fiberglass composite. When the Fish is raced in a cruising class event its (2008) Portsmouth yardstick rating is 97.1. It is not listed in the PHRF critical dimension database.

== See also ==
- Catboat
- Keelboat
- Sharpie
