= Gulf Yachting Association =

Organization in the USA

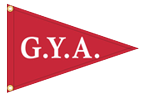
- Burgee
- Short name: GYA
- Founded: 1901
- Location: United States
- Website: www.gya.org

The Gulf Yachting Association (GYA) formed in 1901, is a non-profit organization consisting of 39 member and affiliate yacht club's from Houston, TX to Sarasota, FL along the Gulf of Mexico in the United States. Organized specifically to further the sport of yacht racing, marine safety and seamanship, the GYA is the oldest organization of yacht clubs in the United States.

== Regattas ==
- Sir Thomas Lipton Challenge Cup.
- Junior Lipton Championship
- Capdevielle (multiple)
- Challenge Cup
- Allstate Sugar Bowl Race of Champions

== Capdevielle Racing ==
The Commodore Auguste B. Capdevielle Memorial Trophy was commissioned in 1941 and honors Auguste B. Capdevielle who served as Commodore of the GYA for six terms.

Competition for the trophy has developed and fostered inter-club rivalries, excellent seamanship and camaraderie throughout the GYA's membership. The GYA has only had three Capdevielle one-design boats in over 118 years of racing, the Fish-class sloop, the Flying Scot (dinghy) and the Viper 640

== History ==
Originally formed as the Southern Gulf Coast Yachting Association in New Orleans in 1901 by the leadership of Southern, Mobile, Pascagoula, Biloxi, Bay Waveland, Bay St. Louis and Pass Christian Yacht Clubs, the founding organizations of the reorganized Gulf Yachting Association in 1918 were Bay Waveland, Biloxi, Mobile, Pass Christian and the Southern Yacht Clubs

== Notable member clubs ==
- Biloxi Yacht Club - Biloxi, MS
- Buccaneer Yacht Club - Mobile, AL
- Houston Yacht Club - Shoreacres, TX
- Lakewood Yacht Club - Seabrook, TX
- Long Beach Yacht Club, Mississippi - Long Beach, Mississippi
- Mobile Yacht Club - Mobile, AL
- New Orleans Yacht Club - New Orleans, LA
- Southern Yacht Club - New Orleans, LA
- St. Petersburg Yacht Club - St. Petersburg, FL
